= Frankenstein (Hammer film series) =

British horror/adventure film series

- Directed by: Terence Fisher (1–2, 4–5, and 7); Freddie Francis (3); Jimmy Sangster (6)
- Screenplay by: Jimmy Sangster (1–2 and 6); Anthony Hinds (3–4 and 7); Bert Batt (5); Jeremy Burnham (6)
- Produced by: Anthony Hinds (1–3); Anthony Nelson Keys (4–5); Jimmy Sangster (6); Roy Skeggs (7)
- Starring: Peter Cushing (1–5 and 7); Ralph Bates (6)
- Edited by: James Needs (1, 3, and 7); Alfred Cox (2); Spencer Reeve (4); Gordon Hales; Chris Barnes (6)
- Music by: James Bernard (1, 4–5, and 7); Leonard Salzedo (2); Don Banks (3); Malcolm Williamson (6)
- Production company: Hammer Film Productions
- Distributed by: Warner Bros. (1); Columbia Pictures (2); Rank Film Distributors (3); Warner-Pathé Distributors (4); 20th Century Fox (4); Warner Bros.-Seven Arts (5); AVCO Embassy Pictures (6); Paramount Pictures (6); MGM-EMI Distributors (7); Continental Films (7)
- Running time: 634–643 minutes
- Country: United Kingdom
- Language: English

Frankenstein is a British horror-adventure film series produced by Hammer Film Productions. The films, loosely based on the 1818 novel Frankenstein; or, The Modern Prometheus by Mary Shelley, are centered on Baron Victor Frankenstein, who experiments in creating a creature beyond human. The series is part of the larger Hammer horror oeuvre.

== Background ==
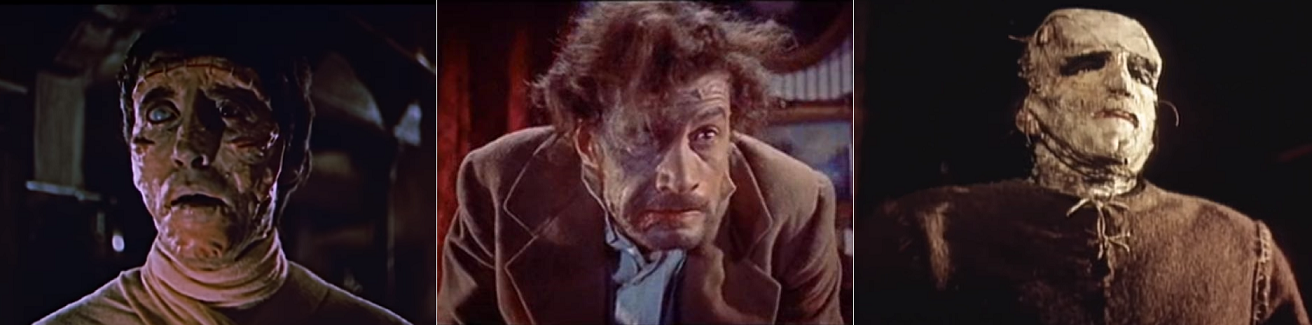
The creatures from the first three films (Christopher Lee, Michael Gwynn and Kiwi Kingston)

The original series of films consisted of seven installments, six of which starred Peter Cushing as Baron Victor Frankenstein.

Producer Max Rosenberg originally approached Michael Carreras at Hammer Films with a deal to produce Frankenstein and the Monster (Rosenberg claims that he came up with the title) from a script by Milton Subotsky. Later, both men were cut out of their profit participation making only a $5000 fee for bringing the production to Hammer. Rosenberg and Subotsky later established Amicus Films, Hammer's main rival in the production of horror films during the 1960s. Screenwriter Jimmy Sangster, who adapted Mary Shelley's novel Frankenstein for Hammer, never mentioned seeing Subotsky's script or being aware of Rosenberg's involvement. Sangster had worked as a production manager and said that he was keenly aware of production costs and kept the budget in mind when writing the script. Sangster said that his awareness of cost influenced him to not write scenes involving the villagers storming the castle that was typically seen in the Universal horror films "because we couldn't afford it". Sangster in an interview with film historian Jonathan Rigby indicated that he hadn't seen any of the Frankenstein films that Universal made. He just adapted the book "the way I saw it".

Peter Cushing, who was then best known for his many high-profile roles in British television, had his first lead part in a film with The Curse of Frankenstein. Meanwhile, Christopher Lee's casting resulted largely from his height (6'5"), though Hammer had earlier considered the even taller (6'7") Bernard Bresslaw for the role. Universal fought hard to prevent Hammer from duplicating aspects of their 1931 film, and so it was down to make-up artist Phil Leakey to design a new look for the creature bearing no resemblance to the Boris Karloff original created by Jack Pierce. Production of The Curse of Frankenstein began, with an investment of £65,000, on 19 November 1956 at Bray Studios with a scene showing Baron Frankenstein cutting down a highwayman from a wayside gibbet. The film opened at the London Pavilion on 2 May 1957 with an X certificate from the censors.

== Films ==
- The Curse of Frankenstein (1957)
  Victor Frankenstein (Peter Cushing) is a brilliant scientist willing to stop at nothing in his quest to reanimate a deceased body. After alienating his longtime friend and partner, Paul Krempe (Robert Urquhart), with his extreme methods, Frankenstein assembles a hideous creature (Christopher Lee) out of dead body parts and succeeds in bringing it to life. But the monster is not as obedient or docile as Frankenstein expected, and it runs amok, resulting in murder and mayhem.
- The Revenge of Frankenstein (1958)
  With the help of Karl (Oscar Quitak), the crippled dwarf hangman, whom he promises a new body, Baron Frankenstein escapes from the guillotine and goes to Germany, where under the name Stein, alongside his eager young assistant Hans Kleve (Francis Matthews), they transplant Karl's brain into the new patchwork body (Michael Gwynn). The operation is successful but as the body's limbs begin to return to the old crippled positions of Karl, Karl escapes and goes on a cannibalistic rampage, calling out the name of "Frankenstein".
- The Evil of Frankenstein (1964)
  Dr. Frankenstein returns destitute to his home village to recommence his experimental research into the reanimation of dead tissue, and stumbles upon his old monster (Kiwi Kingston) suspended in ice. Though he revives the creature, Frankenstein must seek the help of hypnotist Zoltan (Peter Woodthorpe) to repair its mind. Zoltan then assumes control of the monster, using him to wreak havoc. But when Frankenstein tries to regain power over his creation, he becomes Zoltan's next target.
- Frankenstein Created Woman (1967)
  After being reanimated, Baron Frankenstein transfers the soul of his unjustly framed and guillotined assistant Hans Werner (Robert Morris) into the body of Hans's lover Christina Kleve (Susan Denberg) after she had subsequently committed suicide, prompting her, with his memory, to kill the men who wronged them and avenge their deaths.
- Frankenstein Must Be Destroyed (1969)
  When Frankenstein, who looks forward to meeting and working with former associate Dr. Frederick Brandt (George Pravda), learns about his unstable mind and subsequent confinement to a lunatic asylum, he decides to transplant Brandt's brain into Professor Richtor's body (Freddie Jones) in an attempt to cure him, and to acquire the information behind a secret formula known only to him.
- The Horror of Frankenstein (1970)
  A tongue-in-cheek black comedy chiller and remake of The Curse of Frankenstein about a ruthlessly sadistic student who will stop at nothing in pursuit of advancing his shocking scientific experiments, Young Victor Frankenstein (Ralph Bates) murders his own father Alphonse (George Belbin) in order to inherit his title and fortune, and drops out of school to concentrate on his unholy attempts to resurrect the dead (David Prowse).
- Frankenstein and the Monster from Hell (1974)
  Convicted of body-snatching, Dr. Simon Helder (Shane Briant) is sentenced to an insane asylum. On arrival, he recognizes the resident surgeon as the infamous Baron Victor Frankenstein (Peter Cushing), who has been hiding out there under the guise of Dr Carl Victor, discovering that Frankenstein has been assembling a new creature using the body of Herr Schneider, an insane murderer (David Prowse), the brain of Professor Durendel, a musical and mathematical genius (Charles Lloyd-Pack) and the hands of Tarmut, a sculptor (Bernard Lee). Unable to operate himself due to his hands having been burnt, Frankenstein has been relying on his mute assistant Sarah Klauss (Madeline Smith) to stitch the body parts together, now turning to Helder for help. After the operation is a success, the creature is torn between the conflicting aspects of itself – an intelligent, artistic person imprisoned in the body of a murderous hulk. Escaping from its cell, the creature then sets out to hunt down those who abused him – starting with the asylum’s corrupt director Adolf Klauss (John Stratton).

== Tales of Frankenstein television pilot ==
In 1959, Hammer shot a half-hour pilot episode for a television series to be called Tales of Frankenstein, in association with Columbia Pictures, directed by Curt Siodmak. Anton Diffring played the Baron, and Don Megowan his creation. The series was scrapped, largely because of the two companies' disagreement over what the basic thrust of the series would be: Hammer wanted to do a series about Baron Frankenstein involved in various misadventures, while Columbia wanted a series of loosely-connected science fiction stories based around the idea of science gone wrong. Though unreleased at the time of its production, the episode is available on DVD from several public domain sources. It is also available as a Special Feature on the 2012 Blu-Ray release of The Curse Of Frankenstein by Lionsgate. Though the series was never produced, Anthony Hinds commissioned several scripts that provided Hammer with material for their later Frankenstein films, specifically Frankenstein Created Woman and The Evil of Frankenstein.

== Cast and characters ==
List indicators

This section includes characters who will appear or have appeared in the series.

- An empty grey cell indicates the character was not in the film, or that the character's official presence has not yet been confirmed.
- ^{U} indicates an uncredited appearance.
- ^{Y} indicates a younger version of the character.
- ^{P} indicates an appearance possessed by another character.

Character	Main series						Remake
Character	The Curse of Frankenstein	The Revenge of Frankenstein	The Evil of Frankenstein	Frankenstein Created Woman	Frankenstein Must Be Destroyed	Frankenstein and the Monster from Hell	The Horror of Frankenstein
Character	1957	1958	1964	1967	1969	1974	1970
Baron Victor Frankenstein Doctor Victor Stein / Franck / Carl Victor	Peter Cushing Melvyn Hayes^{Y}	Peter Cushing	Peter Cushing	Peter Cushing	Peter Cushing	Peter Cushing	Ralph Bates
The Creature Herr Schneider / The Monster from Hell	Christopher Lee Jock Easton	Michael Gwynn Peter Cushing	Kiwi Kingston	Susan Denberg	Freddie Jones	David Prowse	David Prowse
Priest	Alex Gallier	Alex Gallier^{U}	James Maxwell				Chris Lethbridge-Baker
Elizabeth Heiss	Hazel Court Sally Walsh^{Y}						Veronica Carlson
Schoolmaster	Henry Caine						Neil Wilson
Burgomaster of Karlstaad	Andrew Leigh		David Hutcheson				
Burgomaster's Wife	Ann Blake		Caron Gardner				
Fritz	Lionel Jeffries						
Doctor Hans Kleve		Francis Matthews					
Doctor Karl Holst		Simon Ward					
Professor Durendel						Charles Lloyd-Pack	
Police Sergeant		Windsor Davies					
Christina Kleve				Susan Denberg			
Dr. Paul Krempe	Robert Urquhart						
Justine	Valerie Gaunt						
Aunt Sophia	Noel Hood						
Professor Bernstein	Paul Hardtmuth						
Grandpa	Fred Johnson						
Little Boy	Claude Kingston						
Warder	Michael Mulcaster						
Lecturer	Middleton Woods						
Uncle	Raymond Ray						
Margaret		Eunice Gayson					
Bergman		John Welsh					
Up Patient		Richard Wordsworth					
Janitor		George Woodbridge					
Kurt		Michael Ripper					
Zoltan			Peter Woodthorpe				
Rena			Katy Wild				
Drunk			Howard Goorney				
Doctor Hertz				Thorley Walters			
Anton				Peter Blythe			
Johann				Derek Fowlds			
The Prisoner Hans' Father				Duncan Lamont			
Kleve				Alan MacNaughtan			
Mayor				Philip Ray			
Bystander				Bartlett Mullins			
Spokesman				Alec Mango			
Anna Spengler					Veronica Carlson		
Dr. Frederick Brandt					George Pravda Freddie Jones		
Professor Richter					Freddie Jones		
Inspector Frisch					Thorley Walters		
Ella Brandt					Maxine Audley		
Police Doctor					Geoffrey Bayldon		
Madwoman					Colette O'Neil		
Guest - Plumber					Frank Middlemass		
Guest - Smoking pipe					Norman Shelley		
Guest - Reading newspaper					Michael Gover		
Principal					Peter Copley		
Dr. Simon Helder						Shane Briant	
Sarah "Angel" Klauss						Madeline Smith	
Asylum Director Adolf Klauss						John Stratton	
Transvest						Michael Ward	
Wild One						Elsie Wagstaff	
Police Sergeant						Norman Mitchell	
Judge						Clifford Mollison	
Bodysnatcher						Patrick Troughton	
Ernst						Philip Voss	
Brassy Girl						Andria Lawrence	
Old Hag						Lucy Griffiths	
Tarmut						Bernard Lee	
Muller						Sydney Bromley	
Letch						Victor Woolf	
Coach Driver						Peter Madden	
Alys							Kate O'Mara
The Graverobber							Dennis Price
Lieutenant Henry Becker							Jon Finch
Professor Heiss							Bernard Archard
Bailiff							James Hayter
Graverobber's Wife							Joan Rice
Dean							James Cossins
Instructor							Geoffrey Lumsden
First Bandit							Terry Duggan
Workman							Michael Goldie

== Crew ==
Crew/detail	Main series						Remake
Crew/detail	The Curse of Frankenstein	The Revenge of Frankenstein	The Evil of Frankenstein	Frankenstein Created Woman	Frankenstein Must Be Destroyed	Frankenstein and the Monster from Hell	The Horror of Frankenstein
Crew/detail	1957	1958	1964	1967	1969	1974	1970
Director(s)	Terence Fisher	Terence Fisher	Freddie Francis	Terence Fisher	Terence Fisher	Terence Fisher	Jimmy Sangster
Producer(s)	Anthony Hinds	Anthony Hinds	Anthony Hinds	Anthony Nelson Keys	Anthony Nelson Keys	Roy Skeggs	Jimmy Sangster
Writer(s)	Jimmy Sangster	Jimmy Sangster	Anthony Hinds (as John Elder)	Anthony Hinds (as John Elder)	Bert Batt Anthony Nelson Keys	Anthony Hinds (as John Elder)	Jimmy Sangster Jeremy Burnham
Composer(s)	James Bernard	Leonard Salzedo	Don Banks	James Bernard	James Bernard	James Bernard	Malcolm Williamson
Editor(s)	James Needs	Alfred Cox	James Needs	Spencer Reeve	Gordon Hales	James Needs	Chris Barnes
Cinematographer	Jack Asher	Jack Asher	John Wilcox	Arthur Grant	Arthur Grant	Brian Probyn	Moray Grant
Production companies	Hammer Film Productions	Hammer Film Productions	Hammer Film Productions	Hammer Film Productions	Hammer Film Productions	Hammer Film Productions	Hammer Film Productions
Distributor(s)	Warner Bros.	Columbia Pictures	Rank Film Distributors (UK)	Warner-Pathé Distributors (UK)	Warner-Pathé Distributors (UK)	AVCO Embassy Pictures (UK)	MGM-EMI Distributors (UK)
Distributor(s)	Warner Bros.	Columbia Pictures	Universal-International (US & worldwide)	20th Century Fox (US & worldwide)	Warner Bros.-Seven Arts (US & worldwide)	Paramount Pictures (US)	Continental Films (US)
Runtime	83 minutes	89 minutes	84 minutes	92 minutes (uncut, US) 86 minutes (cut, UK)	101 minutes (uncut, US) 98 minutes (cut, UK)	99 minutes	95 minutes
Release date	May 2, 1957	June 1, 1958	April 19, 1964	March 15, 1967	May 22, 1969	May 2, 1974	November 8, 1970

== Reception ==
Film	Rotten Tomatoes
The Curse of Frankenstein	82% (22 reviews)
The Revenge of Frankenstein	87% (15 reviews)
The Evil of Frankenstein	57% (7 reviews)
Frankenstein Created Woman	62% (13 reviews)
Frankenstein Must Be Destroyed	70% (10 reviews)
The Horror of Frankenstein	58% (12 reviews)
Frankenstein and the Monster from Hell	63% (8 reviews)

== Legacy ==
Hammer's first colour horror film, its worldwide success led to several sequels, the studio's new versions of Dracula (1958) and The Mummy (1959), and established "Hammer Horror" as a new distinctive brand of Gothic cinema.

== See also ==
- Dracula (Hammer film series)
- Hammer filmography
