= James Carreras =

British film producer (1909–1990)

Sir James Carreras KCVO MBE
- Born: James Enrique Carreras; 30 January 1909; London, England
- Died: 9 June 1990 (aged 81); Henley-on-Thames, Oxfordshire, England
- Occupations: Film director; film distributor; film production company co-founder; chairman
- Years active: 1934–1980
- Known for: Hammer Film Productions
- Children: Michael Carreras; Caroline Carreras

Sir James "Jimmy" Enrique Carreras (30 January 1909 – 9 June 1990) was an English film producer and executive who took over the running of British company Hammer Film Productions from his father Enrique. His career spanned nearly 45 years, in multiple facets of the entertainment industry until retiring in 1972.

== Biography ==
Carreras was born in London in 1909. His father, Enrique Carreras, emigrated to Britain from Spain, opening a theatre in London's Hammersmith district in 1913.

The younger Carreras attended the Manchester Grammar School and later managed the Oxford cinema in Manchester before entering the distribution side of the film industry in 1934, when he joined Exclusive Films, formed by his father Enrique and William Hinds a.k.a. Will Hammer. During World War II, Carreras saw combat and rose to Lieutenant-Colonel. In 1946, he returned as managing director of Exclusive Films, where he co-produced Who Killed Van Loon? (1947).

From 1949 to 1980, he was chairman of Hammer Film Productions. He oversaw the growth of the privately owned firm into a successful film company. According to FIlmink "few studios had a cannier head of production".

In 1971 he arranged for Hammer to sign deals with EMI Films and Rank."

== Honours ==
In 1944, he received an MBE. He was knighted in 1970. He was appointed a KCVO in the 1980 New Years Honours. His son was the film director and producer Michael Carreras. He died in Henley-on-Thames, Oxfordshire.

== Filmography ==
- River Patrol (1948)
- Dick Barton: Special Agent (US: Dick Barton, Detective, 1948)
- Dick Barton Strikes Back (1949)
- Dr. Morelle – the Case of the Missing Heiress (1949)
- The Adventures of P.C. 49: Investigating the Case of the Guardian Angel (1949)
- Celia: The Sinister Affair of Poor Aunt Nora (1949)
- Meet Simon Cherry (1949)
- Man in Black (1949)
- Someone at the Door (1950)
- The Lady Craved Excitement (1950)
- What the Butler Saw (1950)
- Room to Let (1950)
- Dick Barton at Bay (1950)
- Cloudburst (1951)
- The Rossiter Case (1951)
- To Have and to Hold (1951)
- The Dark Light (1951)
- A Case for PC 49 (1951)
- Black Widow (1951)
- Death of an Angel (1952)
- Whispering Smith Hits London (US: Whispering Smith vs. Scotland Yard, 1952)
- The Last Page (US: Man Bait, 1952)
- Wings of Danger (1952)
- Never Look Back (1952)
- Stolen Face (1952)
- Lady in the Fog (US: Scotland Yard Inspector, 1952)
- The Gambler and the Lady (1952)
- The Flanagan Boy (US: Bad Blonde, 1953)
- Four Sided Triangle (1953)
- Spaceways (1953)
- Blood Orange (US: Three Stops to Murder, 1953)
- Mantrap (US: Man in Hiding, 1953)
- The Saint's Return (US: The Saint's Girl Friday, 1953)
- 36 Hours (US: Terror Street, 1953)
- Face the Music (US: The Black Glove, 1954)
- Murder by Proxy (US: Blackout, 1954)
- The House Across the Lake (US: Heat Wave, 1954)
- Life with The Lyons (US: Family Affair, 1954)
- Five Days (US: Paid to Kill, 1954)
- A Stranger Came Home (US: The Unholy Four, 1954)
- Third Party Risk (US: Deadly Game, 1954)
- The Men of Sherwood Forest (1954)
- Mask of Dust (US: A Race for Life, 1954)
- The Lyons in Paris (US: The Lyons Abroad, 1955)
- Break in the Circle (1955)
- The Glass Cage (US: The Glass Tomb, 1955)
- The Quatermass Xperiment (US: The Creeping Unknown, 1955)
- Cyril Stapleton and the Show Band (short, 1955)
- The Eric Winstone Band Show (short, 1955)
- The Right Person (short, 1955)
- Women Without Men (1956)
- X the Unknown (1956)
- A Man on the Beach (short, 1956)
- Just for You (short, 1956)
- Parade of the Bands (short, 1956)
- Eric Winstone's Stagecoach (short, 1956)
- Copenhagen (short, 1956)
- Dick Turpin: Highwayman (short, 1956)
- The Steel Bayonet (1957)
- The Curse of Frankenstein (1957)
- Quatermass 2 (US: Enemy from Space, 1957)
- The Abominable Snowman (1957)
- The Edmundo Ross Half Hour (short, 1957)
- A Day of Grace (short, 1957)
- Man with a Dog (short, 1957)
- The Camp on Blood Island (1958)
- Dracula (US: Horror of Dracula, 1958)
- The Revenge of Frankenstein (1958)
- The Snorkel (1958)
- Further Up the Creek (1958)
- A Clean Sweep (1958)
- I Only Arsked! (1958)
- Ten Seconds to Hell (1959)
- The Hound of the Baskervilles (1959)
- Yesterday's Enemy (1959)
- The Ugly Duckling (1959)
- The Mummy (1959)
- The Man Who Could Cheat Death (1959)
- Don't Panic Chaps! (1959)
- Danger List (short, 1959)
- Operation Universe (short, 1959)
- Never Take Sweets from a Stranger (1960)
- Hell Is a City (1960)
- The Stranglers of Bombay (1960)
- The Brides of Dracula (1960)
- The Two Faces of Dr. Jekyll (US: House of Fright, 1960)
- The Full Treatment (US: Stop Me Before I Kill, 1960)
- Sword of Sherwood Forest (1960)
- Visa to Canton (US: Passport to China, 1961)
- The Terror of the Tongs (US: Terror of the Hatchet Men, 1961)
- A Weekend with Lulu (John Paddy Carstairs) (1961)
- Taste of Fear (US: Scream of Fear, 1961)
- The Curse of the Werewolf (1961)
- Watch it, Sailor! (1961)
- Cash on Demand (1961)
- The Phantom of the Opera (1962)
- Captain Clegg (US: Night Creatures, 1962)
- The Pirates of Blood River (1962)
- The Damned (US: These Are the Damned, 1963)
- Maniac (poster title: The Maniac, 1963)
- Paranoiac (1963)
- The Evil of Frankenstein (1963)
- The Scarlet Blade (US: The Crimson Blade, 1963)
- The Old Dark House (1963)
- Kiss of the Vampire (1963)
- Nightmare (1964)
- The Devil-Ship Pirates (1964)
- The Gorgon (1964)
- The Curse of the Mummy's Tomb (1964)
- The Secret of Blood Island (1964)
- Fanatic (US: Die! Die! My Darling!, 1965)
- She (1965)
- Hysteria (1965)
- The Brigand of Kandahar (1965)
- The Nanny (1965)
- Dracula: Prince of Darkness (1966)
- The Plague of the Zombies (1966)
- Rasputin, the Mad Monk (1966)
- The Reptile (1966)
- The Witches (US: The Devil's Own, 1966)
- One Million Years B.C. (1966)
- Slave Girls (US: Prehistoric Women, 1967)
- The Viking Queen (1967)
- Frankenstein Created Woman (1967)
- The Mummy's Shroud (1967)
- A Challenge for Robin Hood (1967)
- Quatermass and the Pit (US: Five Million Years to Earth, 1967)
- The Anniversary (1968)
- The Vengeance of She (1968)
- The Devil Rides Out (US: The Devil's Bride, 1968)
- The Lost Continent (1968)
- Dracula Has Risen from the Grave (1968)
- Frankenstein Must Be Destroyed (1969)
- Moon Zero Two (1969)
- Taste the Blood of Dracula (1970)
- Crescendo (1970)
- The Vampire Lovers (1970)
- When Dinosaurs Ruled the Earth (1970)
- The Horror of Frankenstein (1970)
- Scars of Dracula (1970)
- Lust for a Vampire (1971)
- Countess Dracula (1971)
- Creatures the World Forgot (1971)
- On the Buses (1971)
- Hands of the Ripper (1971)
- Twins of Evil (1971)
- Dr. Jekyll and Sister Hyde (1971)
- Blood from the Mummy's Tomb (1971)
- Vampire Circus (1972)
- Mutiny on the Buses (1972)
- Fear in the Night (1972)
- Straight on Till Morning (1972)
- Dracula A.D. 1972 (1972)
- Demons of the Mind (1972)
