= Hammer filmography =

Films by Hammer Film Productions

This is a list of films made by Hammer Film Productions.

The list does not include the 13 television episodes from Hammer House of Horror, broadcast in 1980, nor the 13 television episodes from Hammer House of Mystery and Suspense, broadcast in 1984.

== Feature films ==
These are the known, theatrically released, feature-length films produced or co-produced by Hammer Productions. Shorter works and television productions are listed separately. When two titles are shown for a single film, the first title is that as released in the U.K., the second in the U.S. During its most productive period of activity (1947−1979), Hammer released 158 films, 50 of which can be regarded as falling within the horror genre.

Genre
Horror/Science fiction
Psychological thriller
Prehistoric

=== 1935–1979 ===
No.	Year	Title	U.S. title	Notes	Ref(s)
1	1935	The Public Life of Henry the Ninth		(Note: Hammer Film's first film production)	
2	1935	The Mystery of the Mary Celeste	Phantom Ship	(Note: U.S. version is 18 minutes shorter than the original version)	
3	1936	Song of Freedom			
4	1936	Sporting Love			
5	1936	The Bank Messenger Mystery			
6	1947	Death in High Heels			
7	1948	River Patrol			
8	1948	Who Killed Van Loon?			
9	1948	Dick Barton: Special Agent	Dick Barton, Detective	(Note: First film in the Dick Barton Trilogy)	
10	1948	The Dark Road	There Is No Escape		
11	1949	The Jack of Diamonds			
12	1949	The Adventures of PC 49			
13	1949	Doctor Morelle			
14	1949	Dick Barton Strikes Back		(Note: Second film to be released in the Dick Barton Trilogy, but the third to be filmed)	
15	1949	Celia			
16	1950	Meet Simon Cherry			
17	1950	The Man in Black			
18	1950	Room to Let			
19	1950	Someone at the Door			
20	1950	What the Butler Saw			
21	1950	The Lady Craved Excitement			
22	1950	Dick Barton at Bay		(Note: Second film to be filmed in the Dick Barton trilogy, but the third to be released)	
23	1951	The Rossiter Case			
24	1951	To Have and to Hold			
25	1951	The Dark Light			
26	1951	A Case for PC 49		(Note: Sequel to The Adventures of PC 49)	
27	1951	Black Widow			
28	1951	Cloudburst			
29	1951	Whispering Smith Hits London	Whispering Smith vs. Scotland Yard		
30	1952	Death of an Angel			
31	1952	The Last Page	Man Bait		
32	1952	Wings of Danger	Dead on Course		
33	1952	Never Look Back			
34	1952	Stolen Face			
35	1952	Lady in the Fog	Scotland Yard Inspector		
36	1953	The Gambler and the Lady			
37	1953	Mantrap	Man in Hiding		
38	1953	The Flanagan Boy	Bad Blonde		
39	1953	Four Sided Triangle			
40	1953	Spaceways			
41	1953	The Saint's Return	The Saint's Girl Friday		
42	1953	Blood Orange	Three Stops to Murder		
43	1954	Face the Music	The Black Glove		
44	1954	The House Across the Lake	Heat Wave		
45	1954	Life with the Lyons			
46	1954	Murder by Proxy	Blackout		
47	1954	Five Days	Paid to Kill		
48	1954	A Stranger Came Home	The Unholy Four		
49	1954	36 Hours	Terror Street		
50	1954	Mask of Dust	Race for Life		
51	1954	The Men of Sherwood Forest			
52	1955	Third Party Risk	Deadly Game		
53	1955	Break in the Circle			
54	1955	The Lyons in Paris		(Note: Sequel to Life with the Lyons)	
55	1955	The Glass Cage	The Glass Tomb		
56	1955	The Quatermass Xperiment	The Creeping Unknown	(Note: First film in the Quatermass Trilogy)	
57	1956	Women Without Men	Blonde Bait		
58	1956	X the Unknown		(Note: Originally intended to be the first sequel to The Quatermass Xperiment)	
59	1957	The Curse of Frankenstein		(Note: First in Hammer's Frankenstein film series)	
60	1957	Quatermass 2	Enemy from Space	(Note: Second film in the Quatermass Trilogy)	
61	1957	The Steel Bayonet			
62	1957	The Abominable Snowman	The Abominable Snowman of the Himalayas		
63	1958	The Camp on Blood Island			
64	1958	Murder at Site 3			
65	1958	Dracula	Horror of Dracula	(Note: First in Hammer's Dracula film series)	
66	1958	Up the Creek			
67	1958	The Revenge of Frankenstein		(Note: Second in Hammer's Frankenstein film series)	
68	1958	The Snorkel			
69	1958	I Only Arsked!			
70	1958	Further Up the Creek		(Note: Sequel to Up the Creek)	
71	1959	The Hound of the Baskervilles			
72	1959	The Man Who Could Cheat Death			
73	1959	Ten Seconds to Hell	Shooting title: The Phoenix		
74	1959	The Ugly Duckling			
75	1959	Yesterday's Enemy			
76	1959	The Mummy		(Note: First in Hammer's The Mummy film series)	
77	1959	Don't Panic Chaps!		(Note: Originally titled Carry on Chaps)	
78	1960	The Stranglers of Bombay			
79	1960	Never Take Sweets from a Stranger	Never Take Candy from a Stranger		
80	1960	Hell Is a City			
81	1960	The Brides of Dracula		(Note: Second in Hammer's Dracula film series)	
82	1960	The Two Faces of Dr. Jekyll	House of Fright; Jekyll's Inferno		
83	1960	Sword of Sherwood Forest			
84	1960	Visa to Canton	Passport to China		
85	1961	The Full Treatment	Stop Me Before I Kill!		
86	1961	Taste of Fear	Scream of Fear		
87	1961	A Weekend with Lulu			
88	1961	The Shadow of the Cat			
89	1961	The Curse of the Werewolf			
90	1961	Watch It, Sailor!			
91	1961	The Terror of the Tongs			
92	1961	Cash on Demand			
93	1962	The Phantom of the Opera			
94	1962	Captain Clegg	Night Creatures		
95	1962	The Pirates of Blood River			
96	1963	The Damned	These Are the Damned		
97	1963	Paranoiac			
98	1963	Maniac			
99	1963	The Scarlet Blade	The Crimson Blade		
100	1963	Kiss of the Vampire	Kiss of Evil (re-edited U.S. TV version)		
101	1963	The Old Dark House		(Note: Remake of the 1932 film)	
102	1964	Nightmare			
103	1964	The Evil of Frankenstein		(Note: Third in Hammer's Frankenstein film series)	
104	1964	The Devil-Ship Pirates			
105	1964	The Curse of the Mummy's Tomb		(Note: Second in Hammer's The Mummy film series)	
106	1964	The Gorgon			
107	1965	Fanatic	Die! Die! My Darling!		
108	1965	Hysteria			
109	1965	She			
110	1965	The Secret of Blood Island		(Note: Prequel to The Camp of Blood Island)	
111	1965	The Brigand of Kandahar			
112	1965	The Nanny			
113	1966	Dracula: Prince of Darkness		(Note: Third in Hammer's Dracula film series)	
114	1966	The Plague of the Zombies			
115	1966	Rasputin the Mad Monk			
116	1966	The Reptile			
117	1966	The Witches	The Devil's Own		
118	1966	One Million Years B.C.		(Note: First in Hammer's Cave Girl film series)	
119	1967	Slave Girls	Prehistoric Women	(Note: Second in Hammer's Cave Girl film series)	
120	1967	The Viking Queen			
121	1967	Frankenstein Created Woman		(Note: Fourth in Hammer's Frankenstein film series)	
122	1967	The Mummy's Shroud		(Note: Third in Hammer's The Mummy film series)	
123	1967	Quatermass and the Pit	Five Million Years to Earth	(Note: Final film in the Quatermass Trilogy)	
124	1967	A Challenge for Robin Hood			
125	1968	The Anniversary			
126	1968	The Vengeance of She		(Note: Sequel to She)	
127	1968	The Lost Continent			
128	1968	The Devil Rides Out	The Devil's Bride		
129	1968	Dracula Has Risen from the Grave		(Note: Fourth in Hammer's Dracula film series)	
130	1969	Frankenstein Must Be Destroyed		(Note: Fifth in Hammer's Frankenstein film series)	
131	1969	Moon Zero Two			
132	1970	Taste the Blood of Dracula		(Note: Fifth in Hammer's Dracula film series)	
133	1970	Crescendo			
134	1970	The Vampire Lovers		(Note: First film in the Karnstein Trilogy)	
135	1970	When Dinosaurs Ruled the Earth		(Note: Third in Hammer's Cave Girl film series)	
136	1970	Scars of Dracula		(Note: Sixth in Hammer's Dracula film series)	
137	1970	The Horror of Frankenstein		(Note: Sixth in Hammer's Frankenstein film series)	
138	1971	Lust for a Vampire	To Love a Vampire (US TV title)	(Note: Second film in the Karnstein Trilogy)	
139	1971	Countess Dracula			
140	1971	Creatures the World Forgot		(Note: Fourth and final film in Hammer's Cave Girl film series)	
141	1971	On the Buses		(Note: First in the On the Buses film trilogy)	
142	1971	Blood from the Mummy's Tomb		(Note: Fourth and final film in Hammer's The Mummy film series)	
143	1971	Twins of Evil		(Note: Final film in the Karnstein Trilogy)	
144	1971	Hands of the Ripper			
145	1971	Dr. Jekyll and Sister Hyde			
146	1972	Vampire Circus			
147	1972	Nearest and Dearest		(Note: Based on the television series)	
148	1972	Mutiny on the Buses		(Note: Second in the On the Buses film trilogy)	
149	1972	Fear in the Night			
150	1972	Straight On till Morning			
151	1972	Dracula A.D. 1972		(Note: Seventh in Hammer's Dracula film series)	
152	1972	Demons of the Mind			
153	1973	Wolfshead: The Legend of Robin Hood	The Legend of Young Robin Hood		
154	1973	Love Thy Neighbour		(Note: Based on the television series)	
155	1973	Man at the Top		(Note: Based on the television series)	
156	1973	Holiday on the Buses		(Note: Final film in the On the Buses film trilogy)	
157	1973	That's Your Funeral		(Note: Based on the television series)	
158	1973	The Satanic Rites of Dracula	Count Dracula and his Vampire Bride	(Note: Eighth in Hammer's Dracula film series)	
159	1974	Captain Kronos – Vampire Hunter			
160	1974	Frankenstein and the Monster from Hell		(Note: Seventh and final film in Hammer's Frankenstein film series)	
161	1974	Shatter	They Call Him MISTER Shatter!		
162	1974	The Legend of the 7 Golden Vampires	The 7 Brothers Meet Dracula (edited US version)	(Note: Ninth and final film in Hammer's Dracula film series)	
163	1974	Man About the House		(Note: Based on the television series)	
164	1976	To the Devil a Daughter			
165	1979	The Lady Vanishes		(Note: Final Hammer feature-length production for 28 years)	

=== 2008–present ===
No.	Year	Title	Notes	Ref(s)
166	2008	Beyond the Rave		
167	2010	Let Me In	(Note: English-language remake of the 2008 Swedish horror film Let the Right One In)	
168	2011	The Resident		
169	2011	Wake Wood		
170	2012	The Woman in Black		
171	2014	The Quiet Ones		
172	2014	The Woman in Black: Angel of Death	(Note: Sequel to The Woman in Black)	
173	2019	The Lodge		
174	2023	Doctor Jekyll		
175	2025	Ithaqua		

== Selected shorter works ==
- Polly's Two Fathers (1935) featurette
- Musical Merrytones No.1 (1936) short
- Candy's Calendar (1946) featurette
- Cornish Holiday (1946) featurette
- An Englishman's Home (1946) short
- It's a Dog's Life (1946) short
- Peke's Sold a Pop (1946) short
- Perchance to Sail (1946) short
- Skiffy Goes to Sea (1946) short
- Tiny Wings (1946) short
- We Do Believe in Ghosts (1946) featurette
- Birthplace of Fame (1947) short
- Bred to Stay (1947) featurette
- Crime Reporter (1947) featurette
- Life Is Nothing Without Music (1947) short
- Material Evidence (1947) featurette
- Paddy's Milestone (1947) short
- What the Stars Foretell (1947) short
- Emerald Isle (1948) short
- The End of the Bridge (1948) short
- Highland Story (1948) short
- Tale of a City (1948) featurette
- Monkey Manners (1950) short
- Queer Fish (1950) short
- The Village of Bray (1951) short
- Giselle (1951) short
- Call of the Land (1952) short
- Mad for Laughs (1952) short
- River Ships (1952) short
- Between Two Frontiers (1953) short
- Cathedral City (1953) short
- A Day in the Country (1953) short
- Sky Traders (1953) short
- Valley of Peace (1953) short
- The World's Smallest Country (1953) short
- Dennis Compton (1954) short
- Holiday on Skis (1954) short
- The Mirror and Markheim (1954) featurette
- Polo (1954) short
- The Adventures of Dick Barton (1955) 15-part serial edited together from the three previously released 'Dick Barton' feature films
  - Part 2 (The Poison Dart)
  - Part 3 (The Smugglers' Cove)
  - Part 4 (Trapped)
  - Part 5 (Plan For Revenge)
  - Part 6 (Fight To The Finish)
  - Part 7 (Sudden Death)
  - Part 8 (Yellow Peril)
  - Part 9 (The Fiendish Experiment)
  - Part 10 (Fight For Life)
  - Part 11 (The World At Stake)
  - Part 12 (The Wail Of Fear)
  - Part 13 (Foiled Again!)
  - Part 14 (Trapped In The Snake House)
  - Part 15 (The Tower Of Terror)
- Archery (1955)
- A Body Like Mine (1955)
- Cyril Stapleton & His Showband (1955) featurette
- Dick Turpin - Highwayman (1955) featurette
- The Eric Winstone Band Show (1955) short
- Eric Winstone's Stagecoach (1955) short
- A Man on the Beach (1955) featurette
- The Noble Art (1955) short
- Parade of the Bands (1955) short
- The Right Person (1955) featurette
- Setting the Pace (1955) short
- Barbara's Boyfriend (1956) short
- Belles on Her Toes (1956) short
- Chaos in the Rockery (1956) short
- Copenhagen (1956) short
- Dinner for Mr. Hemmingway (1956) short
- History Repeats Itself (1956) short
- An Idea for Ben (1956) short
- Just for You (1956) short
- The Magic Carpet (1956) short
- Moving In (1956) short
- Parade of the Bands (1956) short
- Pleasure Hunt (1956) short
- The Round Up (1956) short
- Danger List (1957) featurette
- Dangerous Drugs (1957) short
- Day of Grace (1957) featurette
- The Edmundo Ros Half-Hour (1957) featurette
- Italian Holiday (1957) short
- Keeping Fit with Yoga (1957) short
- Man With a Dog (1957) short
- Seven Wonders of the World (1957) short
- Sunshine Holiday (1957) short
- Yoga and the Average Man (1957) short
- Yoga and You (1957) short
- Blue Highwayman (1958) short
- Cathay Pacific (1958) short
- A Clean Sweep (1958) featurette
- The Enchanted Island (1958) short
- The Riviera Express (1958) short
- The Seven Wonders of Ireland (1958) short
- Danger List (1959) short
- Operation Universe (1959) short
- Ticket to Happiness (1959) short
- Ticket to Paradise (1959) short
- Sands of the Desert (1960) short
- Highway Holiday (1961) short
- Land of the Leprechauns (1961) short
- O'Hara's Holiday (1961) short
- Modern Ireland (1961) short
- National Sporting Club (1961) short
- Sportsman's Pledge (1962) short
- Do Me a Favour, Kill Me * (1968)
- Eve * (1968)
- Jane Brown's Body * (1968)
- Matakitas is Coming * (1968)
- Miss Belle * (1968)
- One on an Island * (1968)
- Paper Dolls * (1968)
- Somewhere in a Crowd * (1968)
- The Beckoning Fair One * (1968)
- The Girl of My Dreams * (1968)
- The Indian Spirit Guide * (1968)
- The New People * (1968)
- A Stranger in the Family * (1969)
- Poor Butterfly * (1969)
- The Killing Bottle * (1969)
- The Last Visitor * (1969)
- The Madison Equation * (1969)
  - an episode of the TV series Journey to the Unknown
