= Frankenstein and the Monster from Hell =

1974 British film by Terence Fisher

- Theatrical release poster
- Directed by: Terence Fisher
- Screenplay by: John Elder
- Based on: Victor Frankenstein by Mary Shelley
- Produced by: Roy Skeggs
- Starring: Peter Cushing; Shane Briant; Madeline Smith
- Cinematography: Brian Probyn
- Edited by: James Needs
- Music by: James Bernard
- Production company: Hammer Film Productions
- Distributed by: AVCO Embassy Pictures (U.K.); Paramount Pictures (U.S.)
- Release dates: 2 May 1974 (UK); 15 October 1974 (US)
- Running time: 99 minutes (UK); 93 minutes (US)
- Country: United Kingdom
- Language: English
- Budget: £137,200

Frankenstein and the Monster From Hell is a 1974 British horror film, directed by Terence Fisher and produced by Hammer Film Productions. It stars Peter Cushing, Shane Briant and David Prowse. Filmed at Elstree Studios in 1972 but not released until 1974, it was the final chapter in the Hammer Frankenstein saga of films as well as director Fisher's last film.

== Plot ==
Baron Victor Frankenstein, having survived the fire at the end of Frankenstein Must Be Destroyed, lives and works in an insane asylum as a surgeon and is given a number of privileges, as he holds incriminating evidence on Adolf Klauss, the asylum's corrupt and perverted director. Frankenstein, using the alias of Dr. Carl Victor, uses his position to continue his experiments in the creation of man.

When Simon Helder, a young doctor and an admirer of Frankenstein's work, arrives as an inmate for the crimes of 'sorcery' and body-snatching, the Baron is impressed by Simon's talents and takes him under his wing as an apprentice. Together they work on the design for a new creature. Unknown to Simon, however, Frankenstein is acquiring body parts by murdering his patients.

Frankenstein's new experiment is the hulking, ape-like Herr Schneider, a homicidal inmate whom he has kept alive after a violent suicide attempt and on whom he has grafted the hands of Tarmut, a recently deceased sculptor. Since Frankenstein's hands were badly burned in the fire, all shabby stitchwork must be done by Sarah, a beautiful mute girl who assists the doctor, and who is nicknamed "Angel". Simon tells Frankenstein that he is a surgeon and the problem is solved. Frankenstein reveals that Sarah is Klauss' daughter and has been mute ever since he tried to rape her.

Soon new eyes and a new brain are given to the creature. When The Monster – lumbering, hirsute and mute – is complete, it becomes bitter and intent on revenge. It ultimately embarks on a killing spree in the asylum, with Klauss as one of his victims. Eventually, it is fully overpowered and destroyed by a mob of inmates. Simon is devastated by the loss of life and reports to Frankenstein; however, the Baron feels that it was the best that could happen to such a creature, and is already considering a new experiment with other involuntary donors. Simon and Sarah watch silently as Frankenstein starts tidying up the laboratory while pondering who among his patients should be first to "donate".

== Cast ==
- Peter Cushing as Baron Victor Frankenstein / Dr. Carl Victor
- Shane Briant as Dr. Simon Helder
- Madeline Smith as Sarah "Angel" Klauss
- David Prowse as The Creature / Herr Schneider
- John Stratton as Adolf Klauss
- Michael Ward as Transvest
- Elsie Wagstaff as Wild One
- Norman Mitchell as Police Sergeant
- Clifford Mollison as Judge
- Patrick Troughton as Bodysnatcher
- Philip Voss as Ernst
- Christopher Cunningham as Hans
- Charles Lloyd-Pack as Professor Durendel
- Andria Lawrence as brassy Girl
- Lucy Griffiths as Old Hag
- Bernard Lee as Tarmut
- Sydney Bromley as Muller
- Jerold Wells as Landlord
- Sheila Dunion as Gerda
- Mischa de la Motte as Twitch
- Norman Atkyns as Smiler
- Victor Woolf as Letch
- Winifred Sabine as Mouse
- Janet Hargreaves as Chatter
- Peter Madden as Coach Driver

== Production ==
Frankenstein and the Monster from Hell was the sixth and last time that Peter Cushing portrayed the role of Baron Victor Frankenstein, a part he originated in 1957's The Curse of Frankenstein. Cushing had long been known throughout his career for his meticulous attention to detail, even in the planned handling and usage of props. For this film, he helped to design the wig that he wore, but years afterward regretted the outcome, and apparently quipped that it made him look like the American stage and screen star Helen Hayes. Cushing's dedication to the role was never truly dampened, however; even at the age of 59 and in poor health, he still insisted upon performing a stunt which required him to leap from a tabletop onto the hulking creature (David Prowse)'s back, spinning wildly in circles to subdue the monster gone amok with a sedative.

Apart from an uncredited cameo in the 1967 James Bond spoof Casino Royale, David Prowse made his second appearance as a Frankenstein laboratory creation in this film, his first having been in The Horror of Frankenstein. He is the only actor to have played a Hammer Frankenstein's monster more than once. During the DVD commentary session for this movie, Prowse said that his daily transformation into "the Monster from Hell" went fairly quickly, being able to suit up and pull on the mask in only about 30 minutes – whereas his time in the make-up chair for his previous Hammer monster role typically required several tedious hours. Prowse and Cushing later costarred in 1977's Star Wars Episode IV – A New Hope as Darth Vader and Grand Moff Wilhuff Tarkin, respectively.

== Releases ==
The film was released on U.K. DVD and Blu-ray on 28 April 2014, with all previously censored scenes restored to the film.

== Reception ==
=== Critical ===
The Monthly Film Bulletin wrote:

Frankenstein and the Monster from Hell seems some way below the level of [Terence Fisher's] best work ... The film begins promisingly by restoring the Baron to the role of Wildean dandy, with a superbly handled entrance in which Peter Cushing, a gaunt figure dressed entirely in black, silences with a – gesture a howling mob of lunatics. The authority and atmosphere are maintained for most of the first half, notably in the inevitable discovery of the animated underground laboratory, seething with sinister chemical life. But the accumulated suspense is finally dissipated by a script which plunges into the kind of comic-strip melodrama that Jimmy Sangster – author of the early Hammer Frankensteins would never have sanctioned. John Elder is evidently at a loss to know what to do once he has established the characters and basic situation; and where Fisher was able to exploit the script's general indecisiveness in the last of the series to lend a more personal tone to the whole project, this here proves impossible. ... Even so, aficionados will find much in the first half of the film to enjoy, and one would still relish further Fisher journeys through the Gothic landscapes that have made him – fortuitously or not – one of the few instantly recognisable British film-makers.

The Hammer Story: The Authorised History of Hammer Films wrote: "Terence Fisher's haunting, melancholy swansong would be an epitaph for Hammer horror itself." Time Out wrote, "Fisher's last film is a disappointment." Leslie Halliwell said: "Cheaply made and very ghoulish horror comic in the unattractive setting of an asylum; very little entertainment is provided."

=== Box office ===
The film performed poorly at the box office.

== See also ==
- Frankenstein in popular culture
- List of films featuring Frankenstein's monster
- Frankenstein (Hammer film series)
- Hammer filmography
