= The Curse of Frankenstein =

1957 Hammer Horror film

- Theatrical release poster
- Directed by: Terence Fisher
- Screenplay by: Jimmy Sangster
- Based on: Frankenstein by Mary W. Shelley
- Produced by: Anthony Hinds
- Starring: Peter Cushing; Hazel Court; Robert Urquhart; Christopher Lee
- Cinematography: Jack Asher
- Edited by: James Needs
- Music by: James Bernard
- Color process: Eastmancolor
- Production company: Hammer Film Productions
- Distributed by: Warner Bros. Pictures
- Release dates: 2 May 1957 (London); 20 May 1957 (United Kingdom)
- Running time: 83 minutes
- Country: United Kingdom
- Language: English
- Budget: £65,000 or $270,000
- Box office: $8 million 728,452 admissions (France)

The Curse of Frankenstein is a 1957 British science fiction horror film produced by Hammer Film Productions, loosely based on the 1818 novel Frankenstein; or, The Modern Prometheus by Mary W. Shelley. It was Hammer's first colour horror film, and the first of their Frankenstein series. Directed by Terence Fisher and written by Jimmy Sangster, the film sees Victor Frankenstein who, upon being sentenced to death, recounts the story of his attempt at creating the perfect human, only to create a violent creature. It stars Peter Cushing as Dr Frankenstein and Christopher Lee as the Creature, with Hazel Court and Robert Urquhart in supporting roles.

The film's worldwide success led to several sequels, and was also followed by new versions of Dracula and The Mummy, establishing "Hammer Horror" as a distinctive brand of Gothic cinema. Professor Patricia MacCormack called The Curse of Frankenstein the "first really gory horror film, showing blood and guts in colour".

== Plot ==
In 19th century Switzerland, Baron Victor Frankenstein is awaiting execution for the murder of his maid Justine Moritz. He tells the story of his life to a visiting priest.

At age 15, the death of Victor's mother Caroline leaves him in sole control of the Frankenstein estate. Victor agrees to continue to pay a monthly allowance to his impoverished aunt Sophia and his young cousin Elizabeth Lavenza. Soon afterwards, he engages scientist Paul Krempe to tutor him. After two years of intense study, the two begin collaborating on scientific experiments. One night, after a successful experiment in which they bring a dead puppy back to life, Victor suggests that they create a perfect human from body parts. Paul assists Victor at first but eventually withdraws, unable to tolerate the continued scavenging of human remains, particularly after Victor's fiancée—the now-grown Elizabeth—comes to live with them.

Victor assembles his creation; with a robber's corpse found on a gibbet, and both hands and eyes purchased from charnel house workers. For the brain, he seeks out the ageing professor Bernstein, so that the creature can have a sharp mind and the accumulation of a lifetime of knowledge. He invites Bernstein to his house in the guise of a friendly visit but, while inviting him to look at a painting — ironically, The Anatomy Lesson of Dr. Nicolaes Tulp by Rembrandt — pushes him over a stair banister and kills him, making it look like an accident. After Bernstein's funeral, Victor proceeds to the vault and removes his brain. Paul attempts to stop him, and the brain is damaged in the ensuing scuffle. Paul also tries to persuade Elizabeth to leave the house, as he has before, but doesn't want to tell her in detail about what Victor is doing; she refuses.

With all of the parts assembled, Victor brings the creature to life. Unfortunately, the creature's damaged brain leaves it violent and psychotic, without Bernstein's intelligence. Victor locks up the creature, but it escapes and kills an old blind man that it encounters in the woods. After Paul shoots the creature in the eye with a hunting rifle, he and Victor bury it in the woods. However, after Paul leaves town, Victor digs up the creature and brings it back to life. Justine, with whom Victor has been having an affair, claims that she is pregnant by him and threatens to tell the authorities about his experiments if he refuses to marry her. He has her killed by the monster.

Paul returns to the house at Elizabeth's invitation the evening before she and Victor are to be married. Victor shows him the revived creature, and Paul threatens to report him to the authorities. The monster escapes up on to the roof, where it threatens Elizabeth. Victor arrives with a pistol and accidentally shoots Elizabeth after seeing the monster grabbing her. She falls unconscious, and without any more bullets, Victor throws an oil lamp at the creature. Its clothes go up in flames, causing it to fall through the roof-light and into a vat of acid, destroying all evidence that it existed.

The priest does not believe Victor's story. When Paul visits him, Victor begs Paul to testify that it was the creature who killed Justine; but he refuses and denies all knowledge of the mad experiment. Paul joins Elizabeth, who is waiting outside, and tells her there is nothing they can do for Victor. After they leave, Victor is led away to the guillotine.

== Cast ==
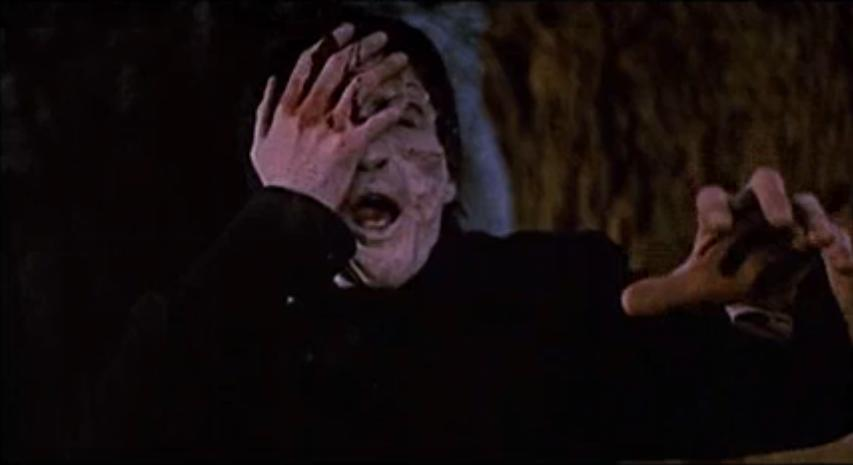
Christopher Lee as the creature.

- Peter Cushing as Baron Victor Frankenstein
  - Melvyn Hayes as Young Victor
- Hazel Court as Elizabeth Lavenza
  - Sally Walsh as Young Elizabeth
- Robert Urquhart as Paul Krempe
- Christopher Lee as the Creature
- Valerie Gaunt as Justine Moritz
- Paul Hardtmuth as Professor Bernstein
- Noel Hood as Aunt Sophia Lavenza
- Fred Johnson as Grandpa
- Claude Kingston as Little Boy
- Alex Gallier as Priest
- Michael Mulcaster as Warder
- Andrew Leigh as Burgomaster
- Ann Blake as Wife
- Middleton Woods as Lecturer
- Raymond Ray as Uncle

== Production ==
=== Development and writing ===
The project originated with a proposed adaptation of Mary Shelley's Frankenstein developed by producers Max Rosenberg and Milton Subotsky, who brought the project to Hammer Film Productions. Hammer subsequently commissioned Jimmy Sangster to write a new screenplay. Rosenberg and Subotsky later founded Amicus Productions, which became one of Hammer's principal competitors in British horror cinema.

Sangster had previously worked as a production manager for Hammer and wrote the screenplay with the company's limited resources in mind. He later recalled deliberately avoiding expensive sequences associated with earlier Frankenstein films, such as villagers storming a castle. Sangster also said that he had not seen Universal's Frankenstein films before writing his adaptation and instead approached Shelley's novel according to his own interpretation.

=== Casting and creature design ===
Peter Cushing, then best known for his work in British television, was cast as Baron Victor Frankenstein in his first leading film role for Hammer. The film also marked the beginning of his long association with the studio and his first on-screen pairing with Christopher Lee. Lee, whose height made him suitable for the role of the Creature, was cast after Hammer had also considered Bernard Bresslaw. His performance became his breakthrough film role.

Hammer avoided reproducing the appearance of Boris Karloff's monster from Universal's Frankenstein (1931). Makeup artist Phil Leakey instead devised a distinct appearance for Lee's Creature.

=== Filming and censorship ===
Principal photography began at Bray Studios on 19 November 1956 with a budget of approximately £65,000. One of the first scenes filmed showed Frankenstein cutting the body of a highwayman down from a roadside gibbet. Location filming also included Oakley Court, near Bray Studios, which subsequently appeared in numerous Hammer productions.

The film was photographed by Jack Asher in Eastmancolor. Its use of colour for blood, surgical procedures and severed body parts distinguished it from the predominantly black-and-white and more suggestive style associated with earlier Universal horror films.

The production encountered objections from the British Board of Film Censors. Hammer submitted the screenplay for advice before filming, and the board expressed concern about its emphasis on gruesome material. After production, the completed film was initially assessed in black and white; additional alterations were requested once the board viewed it in colour. The BBFC records the original 1957 theatrical version as having received cuts. According to Hammer's restoration team, the surviving version reflects those alterations and the original uncensored cut is no longer known to survive.

== Release ==
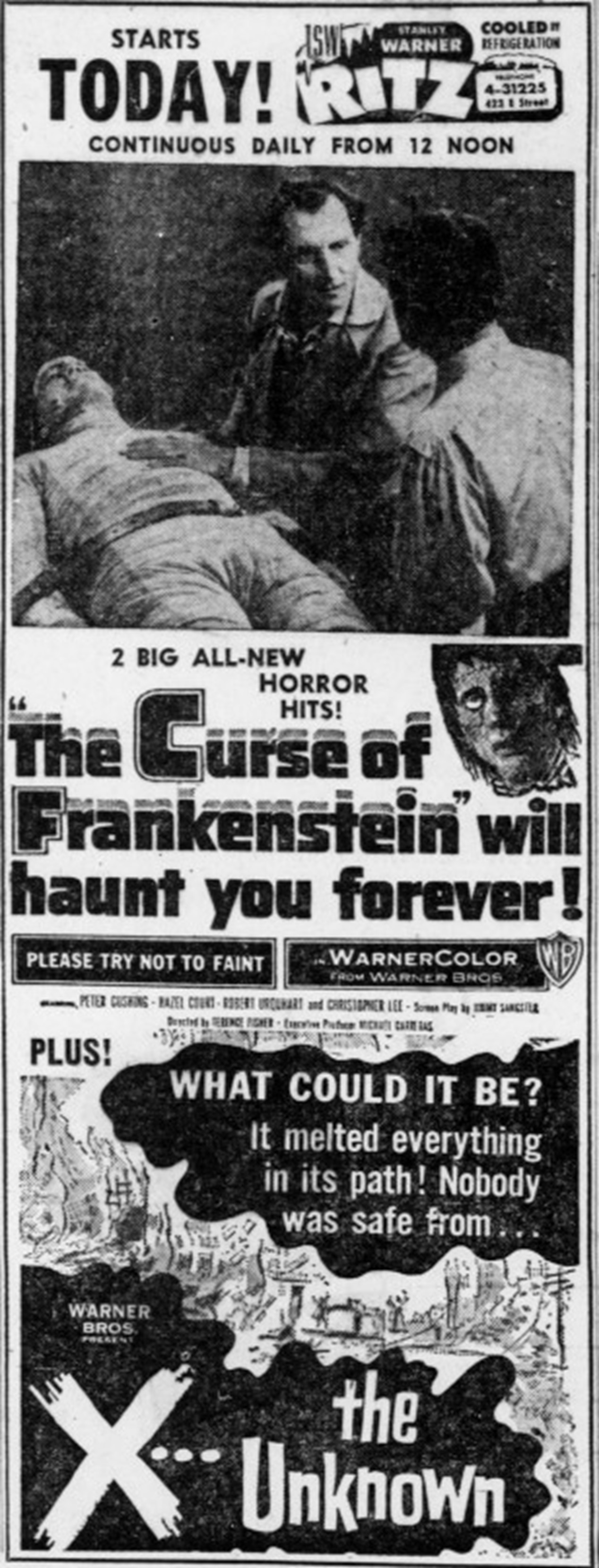
Advertisement from 1957 for The Curse of Frankenstein and co-feature, X the Unknown.

The Curse of Frankenstein premiered in London on 2 May 1957 at Warner Theatre in Leicester Square, with an X certificate from the censors. It received a general release in the United Kingdom on 20 May 1957. It was distributed by Warner Bros. Pictures and supported by the film Woman of Rome. In the US, the film was released by Warner Bros. on 20 July 1957, with X the Unknown as the supporting feature.

In the late 1960s, the film was reissued in the United Kingdom, where it was distributed by Rank/Universal International as a double feature with The Mummy. It was also reissued in the United States on 16 December 1964, with Terence Fisher's Dracula (1958).

=== Box office ===
The Curse of Frankenstein was an international commercial success. Film historian Vincent L. Barnett described the film, along with Hammer's subsequent Dracula (1958), as an international box-office sensation. The film was later reported to have earned more than 70 times its production cost during its original theatrical run.

In the United Kingdom, Variety reported theatrical rentals of $1.9 million, while Kinematograph Weekly listed the film among the British releases that were "in the money" at the box office in 1957. Barnett cites another contemporary account giving earnings of approximately £300,000 in Britain and £500,000 in Japan.

The film also performed strongly in the United States. During its first week at the Paramount Theatre on Broadway, it earned $72,000; Variety reported that this was the theatre's largest opening week for a single-feature programme in two years. Its opening week in Los Angeles, where it played with X the Unknown, grossed $30,900. The film was frequently held over beyond its initial engagement in major American markets, including Boston, where it ran for as long as three weeks at a time when horror films commonly received single-week bookings.

== Reception ==
=== Contemporary response ===
Critical reaction in Britain was largely negative, with several reviewers objecting particularly to the film's graphic use of colour and violence. The Monthly Film Bulletin criticised its screenplay, direction and performances and considered its emphasis on gruesome imagery excessive, although it praised the art direction, colour photography and music. Caroline Lejeune of The Observer described it as one of the most repellent films she had encountered as a critic. The British Film Institute has subsequently noted the contrast between the hostile critical response and the film's enthusiastic reception from paying audiences.

Reviews in the United States was more positive. Film Bulletin regarded it as an effective horror film and praised Hammer's revival of the Frankenstein story. Harrison's Reports considered the production and acting strong but warned that its gruesome imagery could repel some audiences. Bosley Crowther of The New York Times was less impressed, regarding the film as a conventional reworking of material already familiar from earlier Frankenstein films. Variety, by contrast, praised Peter Cushing's performance as Baron Frankenstein as well as Terence Fisher's direction and Jack Asher's cinematography.

=== Retrospective reception ===
The film's critical reputation improved substantially in later decades as Hammer's horror films received greater critical attention. The BFI has described the initial response to Hammer's work as largely dismissive, noting that serious reassessment of the studio increased from the 1970s onward. Reviewing the film's 2025 theatrical re-release, Peter Bradshaw of The Guardian awarded it four stars out of five, praising its brisk storytelling, seriousness and the performances of Cushing and Christopher Lee.

On Rotten Tomatoes, 88% of 24 critics' reviews are positive.

== Home media ==
In October 2012, Hammer Films, Icon Film Distribution and Lionsgate released a restored edition of The Curse of Frankenstein in the United Kingdom on Blu-ray and DVD. The release presented the film in both 1.37:1 and 1.66:1 aspect ratios and restored the close-up shot of a severed eyeball that had been removed from some previous prints.

On 15 December 2020, the Warner Archive Collection released a two-disc Blu-ray edition sourced from new 4K scans of preservation separation elements. It included the film in three aspect ratios: 1.85:1, 1.66:1 and the open-matte 1.37:1 presentation. The edition also included a commentary by Steve Haberman and Constantine Nasr and several documentaries examining the film's production, Gothic influences, cinematography and music. In Germany, distributor HanseSound released Frankensteins Fluch on Blu-ray in January 2022, featuring the uncensored original British theatrical version. The release was issued in four limited-edition Blu-ray/DVD Mediabooks with different cover artwork, each limited to 333 copies.

In 2025, Hammer Films and the Warner Archive Collection completed a new 4K restoration from original film elements. The restoration was issued in the United Kingdom on 4K UHD and Blu-ray and again included the film in its 1.66:1 UK theatrical, 1.85:1 US theatrical and 1.37:1 open-matte presentations. A new 5.1 audio mix was included alongside the original mono soundtrack. The 2025 limited collector's edition also included the 1958 television pilot Tales of Frankenstein, the 1994 documentary Flesh and Blood: The Hammer Heritage of Horror, narrated by Peter Cushing and Christopher Lee, and previously unreleased behind-the-scenes recordings and audio outtakes from the documentary's narration sessions. Warner Archive released the restoration in the United States on 4K UHD and Blu-ray in October 2025.

== Legacy ==
The Curse of Frankenstein is regarded as a landmark in the development of Hammer Film Productions and British horror cinema. The British Film Institute has described it as the first of Hammer's major Gothic horror films, beginning a cycle that would become closely associated with the studio for more than a decade. Its combination of Gothic settings, colour photography and explicit bloodshed helped establish the visual style subsequently identified with Hammer horror. The BFI has also characterised the film as helping to revive Gothic horror at a time when the genre had increasingly been dominated by science-fiction and atomic-age monsters. Professor Patricia MacCormack called The Curse of Frankenstein the "first really gory horror film, showing blood and guts in colour".

The film was a breakthrough for both Peter Cushing and Christopher Lee as horror stars. It marked Cushing's first leading film role for Hammer and Lee's performance as the Creature was his first major horror role; the two subsequently became closely associated with the studio and appeared together in numerous films. Hammer followed the film with Dracula (1958) and The Mummy (1959), forming what the BFI has described as the studio's classic early Gothic trilogy.

The film and Fisher's subsequent Hammer work also influenced later filmmakers. Directors including Martin Scorsese and Tim Burton have cited Hammer's films as formative influences on their work.

== Sequels ==
Unlike the Universal Frankenstein series of the 1930s and 1940s, in which the character of the Monster was the recurring figure while the doctors frequently changed, it is Baron Frankenstein that is the connective character throughout the Hammer series, while the monsters change. Peter Cushing played the Baron in each film except for The Horror of Frankenstein, which was a remake of the original The Curse of Frankenstein done with a more comedic touch, and featuring a young cast headed by Ralph Bates and Veronica Carlson.

- The Revenge of Frankenstein (1958)
- The Evil of Frankenstein (1964)
- Frankenstein Created Woman (1967)
- Frankenstein Must Be Destroyed (1969)
- The Horror of Frankenstein (1970, without Peter Cushing)
- Frankenstein and the Monster from Hell (1974)

== In other media ==
A novelisation of The Curse of Frankenstein was written by John Burke and published as part of The Hammer Horror Film Omnibus in 1966. The collection also included Burke's adaptations of The Revenge of Frankenstein, The Gorgon and The Curse of the Mummy's Tomb.

The film was adapted into a two-part comic strip for House of Hammer. The first part, consisting of nine pages, appeared in volume 1, issue 2 in June 1976, followed by a ten-page conclusion in issue 3 in July. The adaptation was written by Donne Avenell and drawn by Alberto Cuyas. Brian Lewis painted the cover of issue 2, depicting Baron Frankenstein and the Creature.

== See also ==
- List of films featuring Frankenstein's monster
- Frankenstein in popular culture
- Hammer filmography

== Bibliography ==
- Fellner, Chris (2019). The Encyclopedia of Hammer Films. Rowman & Littlefield. ISBN 9781538126592.
