= Elizabeth Lavenza =

- Frankenstein; or, The Modern Prometheus character
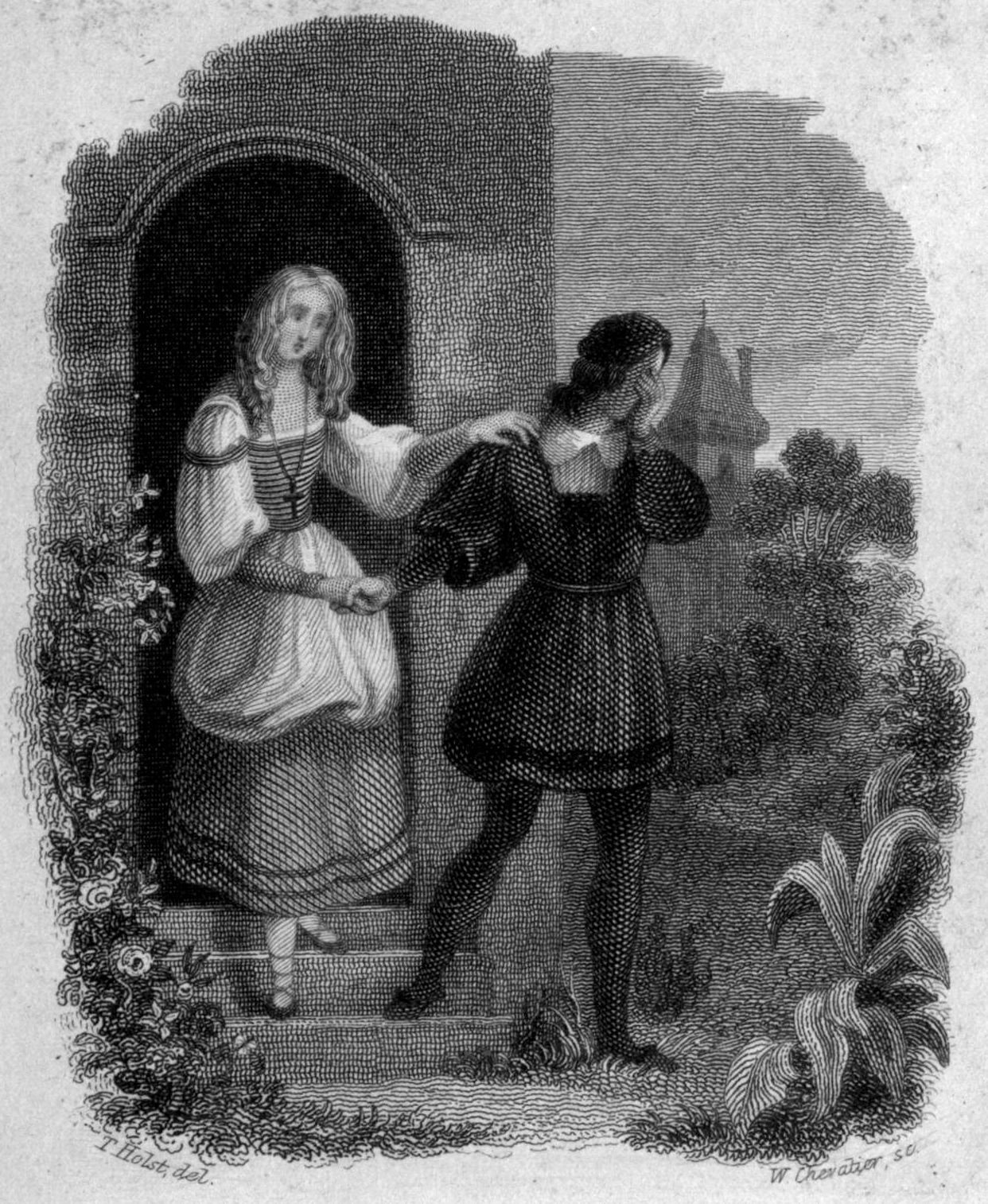
- Victor departs from Elizabeth to study in Ingolstadt. Engraving by Theodor von Holst for the 1831 edition.
- Created by: Mary Shelley
- Portrayed by: Mary Fuller; Mae Clarke; Valerie Hobson; Hazel Court; Madeline Kahn; Helena Bonham Carter; Naomie Harris; Brendan Bradley; Nicole Lewis; Mia Goth

In-universe information
- Gender: Female
- Spouse: Victor Frankenstein
- Nationality: Italian

Elizabeth Frankenstein (née Lavenza) is a fictional character first introduced in Mary Shelley's 1818 novel Frankenstein; or, The Modern Prometheus. In the novel and most of its film adaptations, she is the fiancée of Victor Frankenstein. Her background varies between editions of the novel: in the 1818 edition she is Victor Frankenstein's cousin from an Italian bourgeois family of Milan, while in the 1831 version she is a poor Italian orphan adopted by the Frankenstein family.

== Role in the novel ==
Born in Italy, Elizabeth Lavenza was adopted by Victor's family. In the first edition (1818), she is the daughter of Victor's aunt and her Italian husband. After her mother's death, Elizabeth's father—intending to remarry—writes to Victor's father and asks if he and his wife would like to adopt the child and spare her being raised by a stepmother (as Mary Shelley had unhappily been). In the original novel, then, Victor and Elizabeth are cousins. In the revised third edition (1831), Victor's parents, during a stay on Lake Como, find Elizabeth being raised by a foster family after her German mother's death and the disappearance of her Italian father. In the abridged version of Great Illustrated Classics intended for younger audiences, there is a fourth revision, where the Frankensteins and Lavenzas had been longtime friends. After the death of Elizabeth's parents in an avalanche, Victor's parents become Elizabeth's legal guardian and are pleased to include a girl in their family of all sons. Thus, in the revised edition she is unrelated to Victor, who still describes her as "my more than sister." Victor describes her as his perfect woman: young, beautiful, and completely devoted to him. Elizabeth continually writes letters to Victor, encouraging him and acting as a positive force against his guilt at creating the monster.

After the monster begs Victor to create a mate for him and he agrees, he is furious when Victor destroys it before completion and vows, "I will be with you on your wedding-night." This grim foreboding turns out to be true; on the day of Elizabeth's marriage to Victor, the monster breaks into the bridal suite and strangles her. Her death is significant because it gives Victor a unique understanding of his creation; he now knows what it feels like to be completely alone in the world, with nothing to live for but revenge.

== Role in the Universal films ==
In James Whale's 1931 film adaptation of the novel, Elizabeth is Henry Frankenstein's fiancée, and has no familial relation to him.

She worries when Henry secludes himself in his laboratory and refuses to see anyone, and begs his mentor, Professor Waldman, to talk some sense into him. After his experiments get out of control, Henry departs the laboratory and returns home to his ancestral village. The monster runs loose on the day of the wedding, and Henry tells Elizabeth to stay in one of the rooms. The monster climbs through the window and frightens her so badly that she faints. She is last seen by Henry's bedside as he recovers from his climactic battle with the monster.

In Bride of Frankenstein, Elizabeth and Henry are married. She is kidnapped by the monster as a means of making Henry agree to create the Monster a mate. When the monster decides to destroy Frankenstein Castle with himself, his bride, who rejected him and the evil Septimus Pretorious inside, he allows Henry and Elizabeth to leave. The couple are last seen holding each other as the castle burns down.

== Role in Young Frankenstein ==
In Mel Brooks' 1974 film Young Frankenstein, Elizabeth (Madeline Kahn) is a tightly wound socialite who is engaged to Dr. Frederick Frankenstein (Gene Wilder). When Frederick inherits his great-grandfather's estate in Transylvania, Elizabeth sees him off at the train station. Although Frederick tries to be affectionate, Elizabeth recoils from physical touching out of fear that it might smear lipstick, wrinkle her dress, or mess up her hair. She arrives in Transylvania for a visit shortly after Frederick's monster (Peter Boyle) escapes from prison. After Elizabeth is shown to her room, Frederick tries to convince her to sleep with him. Elizabeth teasingly pretends to agree before insisting on waiting until their wedding night. Extremely frustrated, Frederick leaves the room followed by a string of condescending endearments from Elizabeth. As Elizabeth prepares for bed, the monster enters her bedroom window and kidnaps her. When they are alone in the forest, Elizabeth is horrified to learn that the monster wants sex. Elizabeth is at first against the proposition, but then she sees the monster's enormous "Schwanstücker". Elizabeth gasps, "Oh, my God! WOOF!" She gleefully has consensual sex with the monster repeatedly. When Frederick plays the violin to summon his creation back to the castle, Elizabeth is devastated when the monster leaves her side. She screams, "Where are you going? Oh, you men are all alike. Seven or eight quick ones and you're off with the boys to boast and brag. You'd better keep your mouth shut! Oh, I think I love him." After an operation to stabilize the monster's brain, Elizabeth marries Frederick's now erudite and sophisticated creation. She is last seen with her hair styled just like the female monster from The Bride of Frankenstein.

== Role in Mary Shelley's Frankenstein ==
Elizabeth (Helena Bonham Carter) plays the same role in the 1994 film Mary Shelley's Frankenstein as she does in the novel, save one significant alteration. After the monster (Robert De Niro) kills her by tearing her heart out, a distraught Victor (Kenneth Branagh) reanimates her as an undead being, attaching her head and right hand to the corpse of Justine Moritz. Soon after Elizabeth resurrects, the monster arrives and tries to woo her for himself. As Victor and his creation begin to fight over her, Elizabeth realizes what she has become and screams in agony. Spurning both suitors, she kills herself by setting herself on fire with a Kerosene lamp.

== Role in Frankenstein (2015) ==
In the 2015 adaptation, Elizabeth (Carrie-Anne Moss) has a rather different role. She is Victor's wife and helps him to create the monster (here named Adam), serving as a mother figure for him. When Adam is caught and taken to a police delegacy, he gives the police officers Elizabeth's ID badge and calls her "mother", so they call her. She says she does not know him, abandoning him.

At the ending, Adam finds his creators' house. He attacks Victor, but Elizabeth calms him and tells him the truth about his origins. Victor makes his creation sleep and tries to kill him. Elizabeth tries to save him, but Frankenstein accidentally kills her and runs away. When Adam awakens, he sets his mother's dead body and himself on fire as he cries, "I am Adam!"

== Role in Frankenstein (2025 film) ==
In the 2025 adaptation directed by Guillermo del Toro, Elizabeth is named Elizabeth Harlander and is portrayed by Mia Goth (who also portrayed Claire Frankenstein). In this version, Elizabeth is reimagined as the niece of industrialist Henrich Harlander (Christoph Waltz), whose financial backing enables Victor Frankenstein (Oscar Issac)'s experiments. She is engaged to Victor's younger brother William (Felix Kammerer), though she gradually develops a deeper connection with Victor's creation, the Creature (Jacob Elordi).

Elizabeth challenges Victor's lack of regard for nature and balance, and is empathetic toward the Creature's suffering, serving as a moral counterpoint to Victor's obsession with control.

Elizabeth's storyline culminates during her wedding to William, when the Creature confronts Victor in a violent encounter. Elizabeth attempts to intervene but is accidentally fatally shot by Victor.

== Portrayals ==
Elizabeth Lavenza was portrayed by:

- Mary Fuller in Frankenstein (1910)
- Lucy Cotton in Life Without Soul (1915)
- Linda Albertini in Il mostro di Frankenstein (1921)
- Mae Clarke in Frankenstein (1931)
- Valerie Hobson in Bride of Frankenstein (1935)
- Hazel Court and Sally Walsh in The Curse of Frankenstein (1957)
- Veronica Carlson as Elizabeth Heiss in The Horror of Frankenstein (1970)
- Susan Strasberg in Frankenstein (1973)
- Nicola Pagett as Elizabeth Fanshawe in Frankenstein: The True Story (1973)
- Stacy Dorning in Terror of Frankenstein (1977)
- Minori Matsushima in Kyoufu Densetsu Kaiki! Frankenstein (1981)
- Catherine Rabett in Frankenstein Unbound (1990)
- Fiona Gillies in Frankenstein (1992)
- Helena Bonham Carter and Hannah Taylor-Gordon in Mary Shelley's Frankenstein (1994)
- Nicole Lewis in Frankenstein (2004)
- Lacey Turner in Frankenstein's Wedding (2011)
- Michelle Shields in Frankenstein: Day of the Beast (2011)
- Brendan Bradley as Eli Lavenza in Frankenstein, MD (2014)
- Carrie-Anne Moss in Frankenstein (2015)
- Mia Goth as Elizabeth Harlander in Frankenstein (2025)

Elizabeth was portrayed by Megan Mullally in the musical adaptation of Young Frankenstein and by Christiane Noll in Frankenstein – A New Musical. Elizabeth was also portrayed on stage by Naomie Harris in Danny Boyle's 2011 production of Nick Dear's stage play adaptation of Shelley's novel.

== See also ==
- Universal Monsters
- Colin Clive
- Boris Karloff
- Brona Croft
