= Frankenstein Created Woman =

1967 British film by Terence Fisher

- Theatrical release poster
- Directed by: Terence Fisher
- Screenplay by: John Elder
- Based on: Victor Frankenstein by Mary Shelley
- Produced by: Anthony Nelson Keys
- Starring: Peter Cushing; Susan Denberg; Thorley Walters
- Cinematography: Arthur Grant
- Edited by: Spencer Reeve
- Music by: James Bernard
- Production company: Hammer Film Productions
- Distributed by: Warner-Pathé (UK); 20th Century-Fox (US)
- Release dates: 15 March 1967 (US); 18 June 1967 (UK)
- Running time: 86 minutes (UK); 92 minutes (US)
- Country: United Kingdom
- Language: English
- Budget: £140,000
- Box office: 457,019 admissions (France)

Frankenstein Created Woman is a 1967 British Hammer horror film directed by Terence Fisher and starring Peter Cushing and Susan Denberg. The screenplay was written by Anthony Hinds (as John Elder). It is the fourth film in Hammer's Frankenstein series.

== Plot summary ==
Years after witnessing his father being executed by guillotine, Hans Werner is working as an assistant to Dr Victor Frankenstein, who survived the destruction of his castle in the last film. Victor, with the help of Dr Hertz, is in the process of discovering a way of trapping the soul of a recently deceased person. Victor believes he can transfer that soul into another recently deceased body to restore it to life.

Hans is also the lover of Christina Kleve, daughter of cowardly innkeeper Kleve, whose entire left side is disfigured and partly paralysed. Young dandies Anton, Johann and Karl frequent Kleve's inn and cause a disturbance. Johann threatens to have his father revoke Kleve's licence, if he complains. The three insist that they be served by Christina and mock her for her deformities. The taunting angers Hans, who fights the three of them and cuts Anton's face with a knife. Kleve runs away and fetches the police. Hans tells the police to keep away, that the other three are only getting what they deserve, but the police grab hold of him and Kleve takes the knife from his hand; Hans angrily threatens him. Asked if he wants to press charges, Kleve says no. Anton wants Hans charged, but when the policeman suggests that a fight with three men against one will not look good in court, he relents. Eventually, the dandies leave the inn. They return in the night to steal wine and when Kleve catches them in the act, they beat him to death.

Meanwhile, Hans spends the night with Christina, and, in the morning, watches her leave on the stagecoach to visit another doctor her father has paid, to find out if there is a treatment to help her. Returning to town, he sees a crowd outside Kleve's tavern and when he asks what has happened, the crowd looks at him accusingly. Since the overcoat Dr Hertz had given him is found by the body, and the police heard him angrily threaten Kleve the night before, Hans is immediately a suspect in the murder and is arrested. He would not reveal his time with Christina as an alibi and, known for his short temper, is tried. The trial is a farce, with Anton testifying against Hans, and Hans's father's execution being brought up in evidence. The judge urges him to say where he was that night, but Hans refuses, and, despite Victor and Hertz's defences against the accusations, Hans is convicted and executed. Seeing this as an opportunity, Victor gets hold of Hans's fresh corpse and traps his soul.

Returning from her visit to the specialist, a distraught Christina arrives in time to witness Hans's death and throws herself in the river. The peasants fish out her body and bring it to Hertz to see if he can do anything. Victor and Hertz transfer Hans's soul into her body. Over months of complex and intensive treatment, they cure her physical deformities. The result is a physically healthy woman with no memory of her past life. Victor insists on telling her nothing but her name, and keeping her in Hertz's house. Despite coming to her senses regarding her identity, Christina is taken over by the spirit of the vengeful Hans.

Christina kills Anton and Karl, driven mostly by the ghostly insistence of Hans. Victor and Hertz become suspicious of her behaviour and take her to the guillotine, where Hans and his father were executed. However, they believe she subconsciously retains the memories of Hans's father's death rather than of Hans himself. By the time Victor realises the truth, he finds her already murdering Johann. Despite Victor's pleas, Christina knows she, now, has no one and nothing left to live for, and drowns herself again. Victor, disappointed, and having apparently learned a lesson, walks away silently.

== Cast ==
- Peter Cushing as Baron Victor Frankenstein
- Susan Denberg as Christina Kleve
- Thorley Walters as Dr. Hertz
- Robert Morris as Hans Werner
  - Stuart Middleton as Young Hans
- Peter Blythe as Anton
- Derek Fowlds as Johann
- Barry Warren as Karl
- Duncan Lamont as Werner
- Alan MacNaughtan as Kleve
- Peter Madden as Chief of Police
- Philip Ray as Mayor
- Ivan Beavis as Landlord
- Colin Jeavons as Priest
- Bartlett Mullins as Bystander
- Alec Mango as Spokesman

== Production ==
Frankenstein Created Woman was originally mooted as a follow-up to The Revenge of Frankenstein during its production in 1958, at a time when Roger Vadim's Et Dieu créa la femme (And God Created Woman) (1956) was successful (the film's original working title was And Then Frankenstein Created Woman). The film finally went into production at Bray Studios on 4 July 1966. It was Hammer's penultimate production there.

== Reception ==
=== Critical ===
Variety wrote that the film has "the excellent technical aspects which have come to be expected of the Hammer Film people," but that the script "often seems overly influenced by other and better-written screen efforts."

The Monthly Film Bulletin wrote: "It is thirty-two years since the creative Baron last applied himself to the intricacies of female construction, but this new enterprise in no respect matches James Whale's Bride of Frankenstein. It could reasonably be expected from the title that the pièce de résistance would be the creation of the woman, but by an unusual quirk of obstinacy this is the very point in the story that is casually glossed over, and the script is more concerned with the gory murder spree which follows in the wake of Christina's restoration. It is the pre-credits sequence, in fact – the guillotining of Hans's father – which really sets the tone, for of genuine Frankensteiniana there is little beyond the Baron's initial resuscitation. The laboratory paraphernalia is steam-puffing and picturesque, with a nice line in parabolic mesh, but the poverty of the script is little compensation for loss of the old tradition."

Leonard Maltin wrote: "Everything goes wrong, including script." Leslie Halliwell said: "Crude and gory farrago, with the central laboratory sequence apparently excised at the last moment." The Time Out Film Guide says it is "full of cloying Keatsian imagery which somehow transcends the more idiotic aspects of the plot." The Radio Times Guide to Films gave the film 3/5 stars, writing: "This sequel to 1964's Evil of Frankenstein is considered by Hammer aficionados to be the best Frankenstein made by the House of Horror. ... Terence Fisher's neat balance of psychological horror and murky sexuality makes this a fine addition to the genre."

Martin Scorsese picked the movie as part of a 1987 National Film Theatre season of his favourite films, saying "If I single this one out it's because here they actually isolate the soul... The implied metaphysics are close to something sublime." On the review aggregator website Rotten Tomatoes, 62% of 13 critics' reviews are positive.

=== Box office ===
According to the records of the Fox studio, the double feature of this film and The Mummy's Shroud (1967) needed to earn $1,625,000 in rentals to break even and made $1,590,000, meaning it made a loss.'

== Home media ==
Anchor Bay Entertainment released Frankenstein Created Woman on DVD in July 25, 2000.

Frankenstein Created Woman was released on Blu-ray in October 2013 in the UK and on 28 January in the US. Each disc featured a restored version of the film NS the episodes of The World of Hammer included on the DVD released by Anchor Bay over a decade before. Among the highlights is an audio commentary with actors Robert Morris and Derek Fowlds, moderated by Hammer expert Jonathan Rigby.

== See also ==
- Frankenstein in popular culture
- List of films featuring Frankenstein's monster
- Frankenstein (Hammer film series)
- Hammer filmography

== Selected reading ==
- Rigby, Jonathan (2000). English Gothic: A Century of Horror Cinema. Reynolds & Hearn Ltd. ISBN 1-903111-01-3.
