= The Horror of Frankenstein =

1970 British film by Jimmy Sangster

- Theatrical release poster, promoted as part of a double feature with Scars of Dracula
- Directed by: Jimmy Sangster
- Screenplay by: Jeremy Burnham; Jimmy Sangster
- Based on: Victor Frankenstein by Mary Shelley
- Produced by: Jimmy Sangster
- Starring: Ralph Bates; Kate O'Mara; Veronica Carlson; Dennis Price
- Cinematography: Moray Grant
- Edited by: Chris Barnes
- Music by: Malcolm Williamson
- Production company: Hammer Film Productions
- Distributed by: MGM-EMI Distributors (U.K.)^{1} Continental Films (U.S.)
- Release date: 8 November 1970
- Running time: 95 minutes
- Country: United Kingdom
- Language: English
- Budget: £200,000 or £176,000

The Horror of Frankenstein is a 1970 British horror film by Hammer Film Productions that is both a semi-parody and semi-remake of the 1957 film The Curse of Frankenstein, of Hammer's Frankenstein series. It was produced and directed by Jimmy Sangster (in his directorial debut), starring Ralph Bates, Kate O'Mara, Veronica Carlson, and David Prowse as the monster. It was the only film in the Frankenstein series which did not star Peter Cushing. The original music score was composed by Malcolm Williamson.

== Plot ==
Victor Frankenstein, a cold, arrogant and womanizing genius, is angry when his father Alphonse forbids him to continue his anatomy experiments. He ruthlessly murders Alphonse by sabotaging his shotgun, consequently inheriting the title of Baron von Frankenstein and the family fortune. He uses the money to enter medical school in Vienna, but is forced to return home when he impregnates the daughter of the Dean.

Returning to his own castle, Victor sets up a laboratory and starts a series of experiments involving the revival of the dead. He eventually builds a composite body from human parts, which he then brings to life. The creature goes on a homicidal rampage until it is accidentally destroyed when a little girl accidentally causes the vat in which it has been hidden to be flooded with acid, leaving behind only the creature's shoes floating on the surface.

== Cast ==
- Ralph Bates as Baron Victor Frankenstein
- Kate O'Mara as Alys
- Veronica Carlson as Elizabeth Heiss
- Dennis Price as Graverobber
- Jon Finch as Lieutenant Henry Becker
- Bernard Archard as Professor Heiss
- Graham James as Wilhelm Kassner
- James Hayter as Bailiff
- Joan Rice as the Graverobber's Wife
- Stephen Turner as Stephan
- Neil Wilson as Schoolmaster
- James Cossins as Dean
- Glenys O'Brien as Maggie
- Geoffrey Lumsden as Instructor
- Chris Lethbridge-Baker as Priest
- Terry Duggan as Bandit
- George Belbin as Baron Alphonse Frankenstein
- Hal Jeayes as Woodsman
- Carol Jeayes as Woodsman's Daughter
- Michael Goldie as Workman
- David Prowse as The Monster

== Production ==
The Horror of Frankenstein was entirely financed by EMI under a new deal between EMI and Hammer. The film was originally going to be called Frankenstein then, when Jimmy Sangster re-wrote the script, it was retitled Horrors of Frankenstein before its final title.

Jimmy Sangster was initially asked to rewrite the script (which was originally brought to Hammer by actor/writer Jeremy Burnham). The project began as a straight remake of The Curse of Frankenstein, based on Mary Shelley's original Frankenstein novel. Sangster declined until Hammer sweetened the deal by allowing him to re-write the script, produce and direct the project. Sangster rewrote the script as a black comedy. As Jonathan Rigby points out in the documentary Gallows Humor included with the Blu-ray, the film opened with a credit sequence that made clear what Sangster's intentions were; using what appears to be a felt tip pen (an anachronism) to mark off the body parts in a picture of a woman that would be needed for one of Frankenstein's creations.

Budgeted at £200,000, Hammer sought independent financing and only had domestic distribution arranged at the time of production. This film along with Scars of Dracula (the other film that EMI financed also at £200,000) were the first pair of films where Hammer had ever sought independent U.K. financing. The films played as a double bill. This was a very different approach whereas before Hammer had secured U.S. financing as well to insure that Hammer was not at risk for the production costs. Shot over six weeks, the film used recycled sets from Taste the Blood of Dracula and The Vampire Lovers.

Ralph Bates was cast as Baron Victor Frankenstein. The role was never offered to Peter Cushing, who had played the role five times previously for Hammer. This was part of an attempt to build Bates into a new star for Hammer. As Jonathan Rigby points out, Sangster wrote the role of Frankenstein as more of a psychopath rather than a sociopath as he had been previously portrayed by Sangster and other Hammer writers. Soon afterwards, he appeared as Dr. Henry Jekyll in the Hammer film Dr. Jekyll and Sister Hyde (1971), which co-starred Martine Beswick.

In the mid-1960s, David Prowse, later famous for his portrayal of Darth Vader in the first Star Wars trilogy, had actually gone into the Hammer offices to express his desire to portray one of their movie monsters, but was rather abruptly dismissed. As several years passed by and he went about building a larger body of work through various film roles, he was eventually approached by Jimmy Sangster about being cast as this revisionist Baron Frankenstein's laboratory creation. Prowse has the distinction of being the only actor to have portrayed Frankenstein's monster in more than one Hammer film: this production marked his first such appearance; the second occasion was Frankenstein and the Monster from Hell (1974), where his overall appearance was much more horrifically elaborate. He also appeared briefly in the traditional Frankenstein's monster make-up and costume in a gag appearance in Casino Royale (1967). Other crew members hired by Sangster included composer Malcolm Williamson, production manager Tom Sachs, cinematographer Moray Grant, art director Scott MacGregor, editor Chris Barnes and make-up artist Tom Smith.

== Reception ==
Howard Thompson of The New York Times enjoyed the first hour as "not only painless but also fun," comparing it favourably to Kind Hearts and Coronets. He disliked the final act when the monster emerged, "with awkward horror pitted against rather bland sheepishness. But it was good fun while it lasted. Hammer almost had something special."

Variety wrote that the film "has an occasional lighthearted touch which adds much to its enjoyment," praising Bates for a "nicely suave and sardonic performance as the ingenious, self-assured son of Count Frankenstein."

Kevin Thomas of the Los Angeles Times called it "a talky affair" and lamented that the new Frankenstein was a less sympathetic character than the one Peter Cushing played, as well as the monster being "simply a robot killer."

The Monthly Film Bulletin wrote: "This awkward and inordinately tedious attempt by Hammer to ring changes on the Frankenstein motif is liable to have even those who disliked the old formula wishing it had not been messed about. Jimmy Sangster may have supposed that in turning the Baron into a sexually voracious anti-hero with a macabre sense of humour he was bringing him into line with the Seventies, but in fact he only succeeds in annihilating all the power of the original myth and putting nothing in its place."

The film has a rating of 56% on Rotten Tomatoes based on 9 reviews, with an average score of 5.4 out of 10.

== Home media ==
The film was released in the U.S. on Blu-ray by Shout Factory on 20 August 2019 with a pair of commentary tracks, short documentary, a vintage interview with director Jimmy Sangster, a vintage interview with actress Veronica Carlson and a new interview with Nicholas Granby, the film's assistant director. The special features were rounded out with stills and the original theatrical trailer. The Blu-ray included the film in two aspect ratios 1.85:1 as it played in most theaters and 1.66:1. The U.K. released the Blu-ray on 29 January 2018.

Studio Canal released a restored 4k collectors limited edition in the UK on 24th November 2025.

== See also ==
- Frankenstein in popular culture
- List of films featuring Frankenstein's monster
- Frankenstein (Hammer film series)
- Hammer filmography

== Notes ==
1. In 1986, Turner purchased pre-May 1986 MGM films, including Horror of Frankenstein for U.K, release, now owned by Warner Bros. through Turner Entertainment only in the U.K.
