= Michael Goldie =

British actor (1932–2013)

- Born: Michael John Goldie; 26 February 1932; Edmonton, London, England
- Died: 17 June 2013 (aged 81); Vannes, Morbihan, France
- Occupation: Character actor
- Years active: 1963–1996

Michael Goldie (26 February 1932 – 17 June 2013) was a British character actor active between 1963 and 1996.

== Early life ==
Michael Goldie was born Edmonton, London on 26 February 1932. He spent the early part of his career working as a lumberjack in Canada but gave up tree-felling to study drama at the University of British Columbia. Returning to England, Goldie studied at the Old Vic Theatre School (at age 25, being one of the oldest students), joining their company afterwards.

== Career ==
Goldie starred or appeared in numerous television serials including Coronation Street (as Bob Statham, owner of the Weatherfield Recorder, 1987/88), Doctor Who (in the serials The Dalek Invasion of Earth and The Wheel in Space), The Hound of the Baskervilles, Wycliffe, Inspector Morse, The Bill and Z-Cars. His films included Doctor in Distress (1963), Where the Bullets Fly (1966), The Body Stealers (1969), The Horror of Frankenstein (1970), The Pied Piper (1972), Lady Jane (1986) and Robin Hood: Prince of Thieves (1991).

His stage work included various roles with the Royal Shakespeare Company.

== Personal life and death ==
In his spare time, Goldie liked to renovate old houses and sell them on before moving on to do it all over again. He died in Vannes, Morbihan, France on 17 June 2013, aged 81.

== Filmography ==
Year	Title	Role	Notes
1963	Doctor in Distress	Physical Training Instructor	
1965	Bash and Grab		With Valentine Dyall: six-minute public information film.
1966	Where the Bullets Fly	Labourer	
1969	The Body Stealers	Despatch Driver	
1969	Frankenstein Must Be Destroyed	Warder	Uncredited
1970	The Horror of Frankenstein	Workman	
1972	The Pied Piper	Burger	
1980	Danger on Dartmoor		
1986	Lady Jane	Porter	
1991	Robin Hood: Prince of Thieves	Kenneth	
