= Peter Madden (actor) =

British actor (1904–1976)

- in The Road to Hong Kong (1962)
- Born: 9 August 1904; Ipoh, Federated Malay States
- Died: 24 February 1976 (aged 71); Bognor Regis, Sussex, England
- Occupation: Actor

Peter Madden (9 August 1904 – 24 February 1976) was a British actor.

== Early life ==
The son of Frederick Charles Linnet Butler-Madden and Margaret Teresa (née McCabe), Peter Madden's name at birth was Dudley Frederick Peter Butler-Madden.

== Career ==
Madden was a character actor who made several appearances in Hammer films and was a familiar face in British film and television during the 1950s and 1960s.

He appeared as the innkeeper Bruno in Kiss of the Vampire (1963) and as the stern Police Chief in Frankenstein Created Woman (1967). His last Hammer role was brief, as a coach driver in Frankenstein and the Monster from Hell (1973).

In the cult television series The Prisoner (1967), Madden, uncredited, plays the sinister undertaker in the opening sequence.

On television he was seen in Danger Man, Z-Cars, The Avengers, The Saint and The Champions, Out of the Unknown, Orson Welles Great Mysteries ("The Ingenious Reporter" episode), and Steptoe and Son ( episode "Live Now P.A.Y.E. Later"). He played Inspector Lestrade opposite Douglas Wilmer's Sherlock Holmes in the 1965 BBC series.

== Personal life ==
In 1940, he married actress Mary Jordan (1913–1973). They subsequently divorced. In 1955, he married Marion Snelling, a singer with The Mike Sammes Singers. They had a daughter, Martine (born 1956).

== Death ==
Madden died from a ruptured aortic aneurysm at his home in Felpham in 1976.

== Filmography ==
- Tom Brown's School Days (1940) - Jacob (uncredited)
- Rhythm Serenade (1943)
- The Wicked Lady (1945) - Hawker
- Counterblast (1948) - William Lucas, Nazi (uncredited)
- A Matter of Murder (1949) - Sgt. Bex
- A Town Like Alice (1956) - Aussie POW (uncredited)
- Fiend Without a Face (1958) - Dr. Bradley
- Battle of the V-1 (1958) - Stanislaw
- Hell Is a City (1960) - Bert Darwin
- Saturday Night and Sunday Morning (1960) - Drunken Man
- Exodus (1960) - Dr. Clement
- A Story of David (1961) - Chief Herder
- A Kind of Loving (1962) - Registrar
- The Road to Hong Kong (1962) - Lama (Slim) (uncredited)
- The Loneliness of the Long Distance Runner (1962) - Mr. Smith (uncredited)
- The Very Edge (1963) - Sergeant Williams
- 80,000 Suspects (1963) - Ambulance Driver (uncredited)
- Kiss of the Vampire (1963) - Bruno
- Stolen Hours (1963) - Reynolds
- From Russia with Love (1963) - McAdams
- Espionage (TV series) ("Do You Remember Leo Winters" episode) (1964) - Martin Davenport
- Nothing But the Best (1964) - Ex-Politician
- Woman of Straw (1964) - Yacht Captain
- Do You Know This Voice? (1964) - Supt. Hume
- Dr. Terror's House of Horrors (1964) - Caleb (segment "Werewolf")
- He Who Rides a Tiger (1965) - Peepers Woodley
- Dr Zhivago (1965) - Political Officer
- Out of the Unknown ('Time in Advance', episode) (1965) - Examiner
- Frankenstein Created Woman (1967) - Chief of Police
- The Violent Enemy (1968) - Hewitt
- The Picasso Summer (1969) - Blind Man
- Vendetta for the Saint (1969) - Lo Zio
- The Private Life of Sherlock Holmes (1970) - Von Tirpitz
- Tales of Unease ("Calculated Nightmare") (1970) - Flint
- On the Buses (1971) - Mr. Brooks
- Henry VIII and His Six Wives (1972) - Fisher
- Nearest and Dearest (1972) - Court Bailiff
- Steptoe and Son (1972, TV Series) - Norman, Retired Policeman
- Frankenstein and the Monster from Hell (1974) - Coach Driver
- Cause for Concern (1974) - Narrator (voice)
- One of Our Dinosaurs Is Missing (1975) - Sanders
- The Message (1976) - Toothless Man (final film role)
