= Jack Asher =

English cinematographer (1916–1991)

- Born: 29 March 1916; London, England
- Died: April 1991 (aged 75); London, England
- Occupation: Cinematographer

Jack Asher B.S.C. (29 March 1916 – April 1991) was an English cinematographer. His brother Robert Asher was a film and TV director, with whom he worked on several occasions.

Having begun his cinematic career as a camera operator, he made his debut as a cinematographer, or 'lighting cameraman', on The Magic Bow (1946). He remains best remembered for his work with Hammer Film Productions, beginning with The Curse of Frankenstein (1957), the first of Hammer's Gothic horrors and the earliest colour version of the Frankenstein story. He was the director of photography on several of the colour Hammer films, including Dracula (1958), The Revenge of Frankenstein (1958), The Hound of the Baskervilles (1959), The Mummy (1959), The Two Faces of Dr. Jekyll (1960) and The Brides of Dracula (1960), as well as some of the company’s moody monochrome thrillers like The Camp on Blood Island and The Snorkel (both 1958).

His style was characterised by a fantastical use of colours, such as non-realistic purples and greens. Director Terence Fisher said of him: "Jack Asher had a very distinctive style of lighting, which was quite different from Arthur Grant's... (who) had a more realistic approach to the situation. Jack Asher's was almost theatrical lighting with little tricks, like color slides placed over the lights and so on."

Asher's non-Hammer films included Women of Twilight (1952), The Good Die Young (1954) and Reach for the Sky (1956). In 1964, he was nominated for a BAFTA for Best British Cinematography (Colour) for his work on Hammer's The Scarlet Blade.
