= The Right Person =

1955 British short film by Peter Cotes

- Directed by: Peter Cotes
- Story by: Philip Mackie
- Produced by: Michael Carreras
- Starring: Margo Lorenz; Douglas Wilmer; David Markham
- Cinematography: Walter Harvey
- Edited by: Spencer Reeve
- Music by: Eric Winstone
- Release date: 1955
- Running time: 30 minutes
- Country: United Kingdom
- Language: English

The Right Person is a 1955 British featurette film directed by Peter Cotes and starring Margo Lorenz, Douglas Wilmer and David Markham. It was written by Philip Mackie and produced by Hammer Film Productions.

== Plot ==
Newly married Martha Jorgensen is sitting in her Copenhagen hotel room waiting for her husband, Jorgen, to return. She receives a visit from the mysterious Mr. Rasmusson, who claims to have been a "comrade" of her husband during World War II. He asks her not to tell her husband he is there if he should call.

When Jorgen rings, Martha tells him there is a visitor, but Rasmusson is furious that she has told him he is waiting, and produces a gun. He reveals that he and Jorgenson were two of a group of 12 men in the Danish underground resistance. They were discovered, and ten were shot. Rasmusson concludes that the only other survivor must have been the informer, whom he suspects has returned to the country to claim the equivalent of £5,000 stolen from the organisation. After more than ten years, he has sought out Jorgenson in order to kill him in revenge.

The distraught Martha refuses to believe her husband could have lied to her, but eventually admits she has some doubts.

When Jorgenson arrives home, he has to have a slightly conversation with Rasmusson, but Rasmusson does not reveal his true intent. After questioning him, Rasmusson establishes that Jorgenson is not the man he is looking for. The threesome drink together, and Rasmusson leaves in a noticeably cheerier mood, thankful to have spared Martha the distress of losing her husband.

Martha is satisfied that her husband has not lied, until the final moments, when Jorgen reveals he has been out for the day on business, settling the estate of a late uncle – who has left him the princely sum of £5,000.

== Cast ==
- Margo Lorenz as Martha Jorgensen
- Douglas Wilmer as Hans Rasmussen
- David Markham as Jürgen Jorgensen

== Production ==
It was filmed almost entirely on one set at Bray Studios, by then Hammer's permanent home. Establishing shots were filmed by producer Michael Carreras and a small crew in the Danish capital of Copenhagen. A short travelogue was also filmed while they were there.

It was shot in Eastmancolor and Cinemascope by Walter J. Harvey. The music was by Eric Winstone.

== Reception ==
Kine Weekly wrote: "The players meet all demands and its one scene impresses, but no attempt is made to break up the talk. Wordy and inconclusive, it's more suited to TV than the silver screen."

Picturegoer wrote: "Margo Lorenz and Douglas Wilmer make the most of the story, but the incessant talk becomes very tiresome."

== See also ==
- Hammer filmography
