= River Patrol (film) =

- Opening titles
- Directed by: Ben R. Hart
- Written by: James Corbett (unverified)
- Produced by: Hal Wilson
- Starring: John Blythe; Lorna Dean; Wally Patch; Stan Paskin
- Cinematography: Bertram Brooks-Carrington
- Edited by: James Corbett
- Music by: Paxtons
- Production companies: Hammer Film Productions; Knightsbridge Films
- Distributed by: Exclusive Films
- Release date: 28 January 1948
- Running time: 46 minutes
- Country: United Kingdom
- Language: English

River Patrol is a 1948 British second feature ('B') crime film directed by Ben R. Hart and starring John Blythe, Lorna Dean, and Wally Patch. The screenplay was likely written by the film's editor James Corbett, but there is no writer's credit listed. The film concerns a group of undercover British customs officers who investigate a gang of smugglers. It was made by Hammer Film Productions at Marylebone Studios in London. It is notable for being one of the earliest films made by Hammer following its relaunch after the Second World War. Its running time was so short, many reviewers considered it more of a short subject rather than a feature film. Nevertheless, it is today considered a lost film

== Plot ==
Two British customs officers, Robby and Jean, go undercover, pretending to be husband and wife in order to smash a ring of smugglers along the Thames. During the investigation they visit the most shady places of London, including "Sure", a night club with the worst imaginable reputation in the city. The fake spouses befriend and dupe the night club owner and find evidence leading to the identity of the top boss of the smuggling ring. The criminals are planning to smuggle 20,000 pairs of nylon stockings hidden in laundry baskets. However, the agents' identities are discovered by the criminals before they can report back to their superiors, and they are kidnapped by the thugs and held prisoner until they are rescued by the River Patrol.

== Cast ==
- John Blythe as Robby
- Lorna Dean as Jean
- Wally Patch as the chief
- Stan Paskin as Alex
- Cyril Collins
- George Crowther
- Andrew Sterne
- Wilton West
- Tony Merrett
- George Kane
- Johnny Doherty
- Iris Keen
- Dolly Gwynne
- Audrey Hibbs

== Reception ==
"River Patrol" was trade shown at the Hammer Theatres on January 28, 1948. The Kinematograph Weekly reviewed it on Feb. 5, 1948.

The Monthly Film Bulletin wrote: "The film evidently does not aim very high in either direction or production. Scenes in a continental café, in particular, are unconvincing, though elsewhere a certain feeling of suspense is built up. John Blythe heads the cast capably."

Kine Weekly wrote: "Thumbnail crime melodrama. It tries hard to be tough, but uneven direction, faulty timing, and cramped staging give its roughstuff a somewhat phoney ring. ... The opening is promising, but the film starts to degenerate immediately the hero and villain come to grips. The fights and exchanges are much too one-sided and the continental café sequences are very stagey. So is the big-fire climax. Clumsy pocket-serial, there is little to it, apart from its quota ticket.

In British Sound Films: The Studio Years 1928–1959 David Quinlan rated the film as "mediocre", writing: "Unambitious pocket thriller."
