= The Jack of Diamonds =

1949 British adventure film

- Directed by: Vernon Sewell
- Written by: unconfirmed
- Produced by: Vernon Sewell; Walter d'Eyncourt
- Starring: Nigel Patrick; Cyril Raymond; Joan Carroll; Darcy Conyers; Vernon Sewell
- Cinematography: Moray Grant
- Music by: Frank Spencer
- Production company: Vernon Sewell Productions
- Distributed by: Exclusive Films
- Release date: 7 February 1949
- Running time: 73 minutes
- Country: United Kingdom
- Language: English

The Jack of Diamonds is a 1949 British adventure film directed by Vernon Sewell and starring Nigel Patrick, Cyril Raymond and Joan Carroll. Its plot follows an ex-soldier who persuades some yacht owners to help recover a treasure chest of jewels he hid off the French coast in 1940 during the Second World War. It once was considered a lost film, but is now available through various private collectors.

== Plot ==
A once wealthy but now impoverished English couple, Roger and Joan Keen, are forced to offer their yacht for charter. It's taken by a man claiming to be an Alan Butler, who wants to sail to the coast of France to recover a sunken chest of jewels given to him, three years ago, by a Frenchman who'd trusted him to look after them until the war ended, but Butler's ship had sunk before being able to return safely to England. Joan meets a French woman named Giselle. Without knowing the purpose of Joan's real reasons for being in France, a melancholy Giselle confides to her the story of how her father had entusted his jewells to an Alan Butler during the German occupation; how Butler's ship had sunk; and that she thought the recovery of them without knowing the ship's location was hopeless. Butler finds the treasure whilst Roger and Joan are ashore with Giselle. Upon their return, and after it's revealed the man claiming to be Butler is an imposter who'd once known him, he sets the others adrift, and steals their boat. He is captured after a chase, and set adrift himself with his accomplices. Their rightful owner, Giselle, generously shares with the jewels with Joan and Roger.

== Cast ==
- Nigel Patrick as Alan Butler
- Cyril Raymond as Roger Keen
- Joan Carroll as Joan Keen
- Dolly Bouwmeester as Giselle
- John Basings as Parsons
- Darcy Conyers as Colin Campbell
- Vernon Sewell as engineer
- Edwin Richfield as George Paxton
- Guy Romano as Douamier

== Production ==
Sewell filmed parts of the film on his own personal yacht.

== Critical reception ==
The Monthly Film Bulletin wrote: "Neat dialogue, plausible characterisation and good photography are the main features of this pleasantly unpretentious piece of film making. The cast, headed by Nigel Patrick as Butler, and Cyril Raymond and Joan Carol as the Keens, enters more than competently into the general spirit of adventure."

Kine Weekly wrote: "The hand-picked leading players display plenty of spirit and their eager teamwork, coupled with authentic and picturesque backgrounds, brings out the best in the engaging and exciting piratical yarn. Independent of the studio, it obviously cost no fortune to make, but every cent is on the screen. ... The picture takes quite long enough to unfold, but, although it ships a little water as it nears the end of its Channel adventure, the enthusiasm of the cast, director and technicians never wanes. A jolly and lively improvisation, it's certain to register with the general run of picturegoers. It has a real salty tang."

TV Guide gave the film two out of four stars, writing: "This well-paced effort takes full advantage of its characterizations and the high seas background."
