= Michael Gwynn =

English actor (1916–1976)

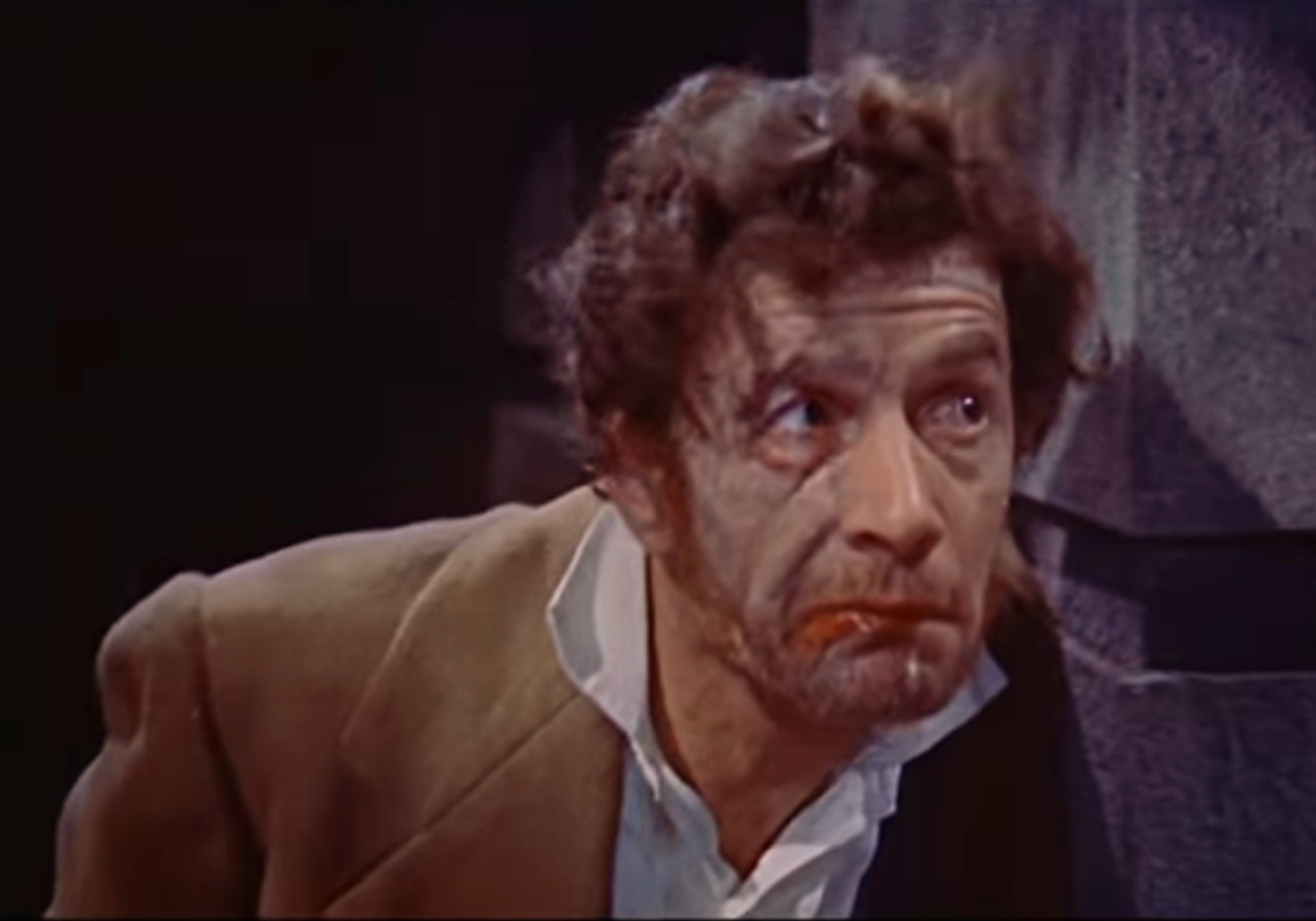
- Gwynn in The Revenge of Frankenstein
- Born: 30 November 1916; Bath, Somerset, England
- Died: 29 January 1976 (aged 59); London, England
- Occupation: Actor
- Years active: 1954–1976
- Spouse: Margaret Bartlam (m. 1940)
- Children: 2

Michael Gwynn (30 November 1916 – 29 January 1976) was an English actor whose career spanned 40 years, across a variety of stage, film, and television roles.

== Life and career ==
Gwynn was born in Bath, Somerset. He attended Mayfield College near Mayfield, Sussex. During the Second World War he served in East Africa as a major and was adjutant to the 2nd (Nyasaland) Battalion of the King's African Rifles. He married his wife, Margaret Jean (Bartlam) Gwynn in 1940 and they had two children, a son and a daughter.

Gwynn is perhaps best remembered for his role in the first episode of the BBC comedy Fawlty Towers "A Touch of Class" (1975) as the conman "Lord" Melbury who eventually humiliates Basil Fawlty. For Hammer Films, he performed in several productions including the war film The Camp on Blood Island (1958), and Never Take Sweets from a Stranger (1960), a rare drama film for the studio; he also appeared in one of their horror movies, The Revenge of Frankenstein (1958), in which he played a variation of Frankenstein's monster, and Scars of Dracula (1970) in the role of a priest determined to battle Count Dracula. He had a lead role in 1960's Village of the Damned, produced and distributed by MGM-British Studios.

Gwynn also appeared on several adaptations of plays on the Caedmon Records label. Among them were Cyrano de Bergerac, in which he played Le Bret, and Julius Caesar, in which he played Casca. Both productions starred Ralph Richardson in the title roles. Gwynn also appeared in a BBC serialised adaptation of Great Expectations as Joe Gargery in 1959.

Gwynn died on 29 January 1976 in London from a heart attack, aged 59. Earlier that day, he had finished filming on Spawn, a television play for London Weekend Television.

== Plays ==
- 1956 – A View from the Bridge (opening season) by Arthur Miller; director Peter Brook – Alfieri.

== Filmography ==
Year	Title	Role	Notes
1954	The Runaway Bus	1st Transport Officer	
1958	The Secret Place	Steve Waring	
1958	Dunkirk	Commander – Sheerness	
1958	The Camp on Blood Island	Tom Shields	
1958	The Revenge of Frankenstein	Karl	
1958	The Doctor's Dilemma	Dr. Blenkinsop	
1960	Never Take Sweets from a Stranger	Prosecutor	
1960	Village of the Damned	Alan Bernard	
1961	Question 7	Friedrich Gottfried – Pastor	
1961	What a Carve Up!	Malcolm Broughton	
1961	Barabbas	Lazarus	
1962	Some People	Vicar	
1963	Cleopatra	Climber	
1963	Jason and the Argonauts	Hermes	
1964	The Fall of the Roman Empire	Cornelius	
1965	Catch Us If You Can	Hardingford	
1966	The Deadly Bees	Dr. George Lang	
1967	The Crowning Gift	Jesus Christ	
1969	The Virgin Soldiers	Lt. Col. Bromley-Pickering	
1970	Scars of Dracula	Priest	
1976	Spy Story	Dawlish	

== Television ==
Year	Title	Role	Notes
1955	Strange Experiences	Thief	Episode: "Hold-Up Man"
1963	Espionage	George Case	Episode: "The Incurable One"
1963	Ghost Squad	Professor Boone	Episode: "PG7"
1965	Danger Man	Military Attache - Colonel	Episode: "A Room in the Basement"
1965	The Saint	Martin Jeffroll	Episode: "The Frightened Inn-Keeper"
1966	The Baron	Mark Seldon	Episode: "Something for a Rainy Day"
1969	The Avengers	Bill Bassett	Episode: "Take-Over"
1969	Department S	Franz Drieker	Episode: "A Ticket to Nowhere"
1969	Randall and Hopkirk (Deceased)	Hyde Watson	Episode: "The Man from Nowhere"
1971	Jason King	Vaturin	2 episodes
1972	Colditz	Standardtenführer Hessler	Episode: "Maximum Security"
1973	Some Mothers Do 'Ave 'Em	Wing Cdr Day	Episode: "RAF Reunion"
1974	Rooms	Mr. Cotgrove	Episode: "Mr Cotgrove & Miss Hicks"
1975	Fawlty Towers	Lord Melbury	Episode: "A Touch of Class"
1975	Poldark	Justice Lister	2 episodes
