= Danger List =

- Directed by: Leslie Arliss
- Written by: J.D. Scott
- Produced by: Anthony Hinds; Executive producer Michael Carreras
- Starring: Philip Friend; Honor Blackman
- Cinematography: Arthur Grant
- Edited by: A.E. Cox
- Music by: Edwin Astley
- Release date: 1957
- Running time: 22 minutes
- Country: United Kingdom
- Language: English

Danger List (also known as Dangerous Drugs) is a 1957 British second feature ('B') short film directed by Leslie Arliss for Hammer Film Productions. It stars Philip Friend, Honor Blackman and Mervyn Johns. It was written by J.D. Scott, photographed by Arthur Grant, with a score by Edwin Astley.

== Plot ==
A nurse in the dispensary of an English hospital is suffering with a migraine, and accidentally dispenses the wrong medicines to three patients. The police and doctors have little time to locate the patients before the consequences are fatal.

All three patients are located. However, the husband of the third uses the pills to kill his wife, who is already suffering from a terminal illness, and takes one himself to join her in death.

== Cast ==
- Philip Friend as Dr. Jim Bennett
- Honor Blackman as Gillian Freeman
- Mervyn Johns as Mr. Ellis
- Constance Fraser as Mrs. Ellis
- Alexander Field as Mr. Carlton
- Muriel Zillah as Mrs. Coombe
- Amanda Coxell as Laura Coombe
- Everley Gregg as neighbour
- Pauline Olsen as young nurse
- Jeremy Longhurst as mobile policeman
- Patricia Cree as Audrey

== Reception ==
The Monthly Film Bulletin wrote: "This peculiar short story is an uneasy mixture of suspense, comedy and tragedy (the final mercy-killing and suicide). Since the whole thing is rather pointless, with nothing to say on the subject of mercy-killing, it seems an unnecessary reflection on hospital authorities and discouragement to their patients to dwell on the possibility of such a serious error."
