= A Clean Sweep =

1958 British film by Maclean Rogers

- Opening titles
- Directed by: Maclean Rogers
- Written by: Eric Barker; Patrick Brawn
- Produced by: Michael Carreras; Anthony Hinds
- Starring: Thora Hird; Eric Barker; Vera Day; Ian Whittaker
- Cinematography: Arthur Grant
- Edited by: A.E. Cox
- Music by: Edwin Astley
- Production company: Hammer Films
- Release date: 1958 (UK)
- Running time: 35 minutes
- Country: United Kingdom
- Language: English

A Clean Sweep is a 1958 British comedy short film directed by Maclean Rogers and starring Thora Hird, Eric Barker and Vera Day. It was written by Eric Barker and Patrick Brawn.

== Preservation status ==
The British Film Institute National Archive holds no stills or ephemera, and no film or video materials.

== Plot ==
A woman tries to keep her family of gamblers away from temptation.

== Cast ==
- Thora Hird as Vera Watson
- Eric Barker as George Watson
- Vera Day as Daphne Watson
- Ian Whittaker as Dick Watson
- Wallas Eaton as Ted
- Bill Fraser as bookmaker
