= The Revenge of Frankenstein =

1958 British film by Terence Fisher

- Theatrical release poster
- Directed by: Terence Fisher
- Screenplay by: Jimmy Sangster
- Additional dialogue by: Hurford James
- Based on: Victor Frankenstein by Mary Shelley
- Produced by: Anthony Hinds
- Starring: Peter Cushing; Francis Matthews; Eunice Gayson; Michael Gwynn
- Cinematography: Jack Asher
- Edited by: Alfred Cox
- Music by: Leonard Salzedo
- Color process: Technicolor
- Production company: Hammer Film Productions
- Distributed by: Columbia Pictures
- Release dates: 1 June 1958 (US); 17 November 1958 (London)
- Running time: 91 minutes
- Country: United Kingdom
- Language: English
- Box office: 455,241 admissions (France)

The Revenge of Frankenstein is a 1958 British horror film directed by Terence Fisher and starring Peter Cushing, Francis Matthews, Michael Gwynn, Oscar Quitak, Eunice Gayson and Michael Ripper. Made by Hammer Film Productions, the film was a sequel to The Curse of Frankenstein, the studio's 1957 adaptation of Mary Shelley's 1818 novel Frankenstein; or, The Modern Prometheus, and the second instalment in their Frankenstein series.

The film was released in the US in June on a double-bill with Curse of the Demon. Phil Leakey did makeup, Bernard Robinson was the production designer and Robert Lynn and Tom Walls were assistant directors. The film was originally planned to be called Blood of Frankenstein. While this film was being made, Hammer was simultaneously producing a pilot for their planned American TV series Tales Of Frankenstein in Hollywood, which starred Anton Diffring.

== Plot ==
In 1860, Baron Victor Frankenstein is sentenced to death by guillotine for the murders committed by the monster he created. He escapes execution by having a priest beheaded and buried in his place with the aid of a hunchback named Karl. Three years later, Victor, now going by the alias Doctor Stein, has become a successful physician in Karlsbrück, catering to the wealthy while also attending to the poor in a paupers' hospital. Hans Kleve, a junior member of the medical council, recognizes Victor and, being an admirer, requests an apprenticeship with him. Together with Karl, Victor and Hans continue with the Baron's experiment: transplanting a living brain into a new body, one that is not a crude, cobbled-together creature. The deformed Karl is more than willing to volunteer his brain thereby gaining a healthy body, particularly after meeting Margaret Conrad, the lovely new assistant at the hospital.

The transplant succeeds, but when the excited Hans tells Karl that he will be a medical sensation, Karl panics and convinces Margaret to free him. Hans notes that the chimpanzee into which Victor had transplanted the brain of an orangutan ate its mate. He worries about Karl, but his concerns are brushed off by Victor. Karl flees from the hospital and hides in Victor's laboratory, where he burns his preserved hunchback body. He is attacked by a drunken janitor, who takes him for a burglar, but manages to kill the man. Victor and Hans discover Karl is missing and begin searching for him.

The next morning, Margaret finds Karl in her aunt's stable. While she goes to fetch Hans, Karl experiences difficulties with his arm and leg. When Hans and Margaret arrive, he is gone. At night, Karl ambushes and strangles Gerda, a local girl. The next night, he rushes into an evening reception. Having redeveloped his deformities, he begs Victor for help, using his real name of Frankenstein, before he collapses and dies. Victor, disregarding Hans' pleas that he should leave the country, appears before the medical council, where he denies being the infamous Frankenstein. The unsatisfied councilors open Victor's supposed grave, only to discover the priest's body, and conclude that the real Frankenstein is still alive.

At the hospital, the patients violently attack Victor in rage and Hans rushes his dying mentor to the lab. The police arrive to arrest Victor, but when Hans shows them Victor's dead body, they leave. Hans then transplants Victor's brain into a new body that Victor had prepared earlier, which he made to resemble him. Sometime later in London, Hans assists Victor, now calling himself Doctor Franck, in welcoming some patients.

== Cast ==
- Peter Cushing as Doctor Victor Stein/Frankenstein
- Francis Matthews as Doctor Hans Kleve
- Eunice Gayson as Margaret Conrad
- Oscar Quitak as Karl, in his hunchback form
  - Michael Gwynn as Karl, in his created body
- John Welsh as Bergman
- Lionel Jeffries as Fritz
- Richard Wordsworth as Up Patient
- Charles Lloyd-Pack as President of the Medical Council
- George Woodbridge as Janitor
- Michael Ripper as Kurt
- Ian Whittaker as Boy
- Avril Leslie as Gerda
- Alex Gallier as Priest

== Production ==
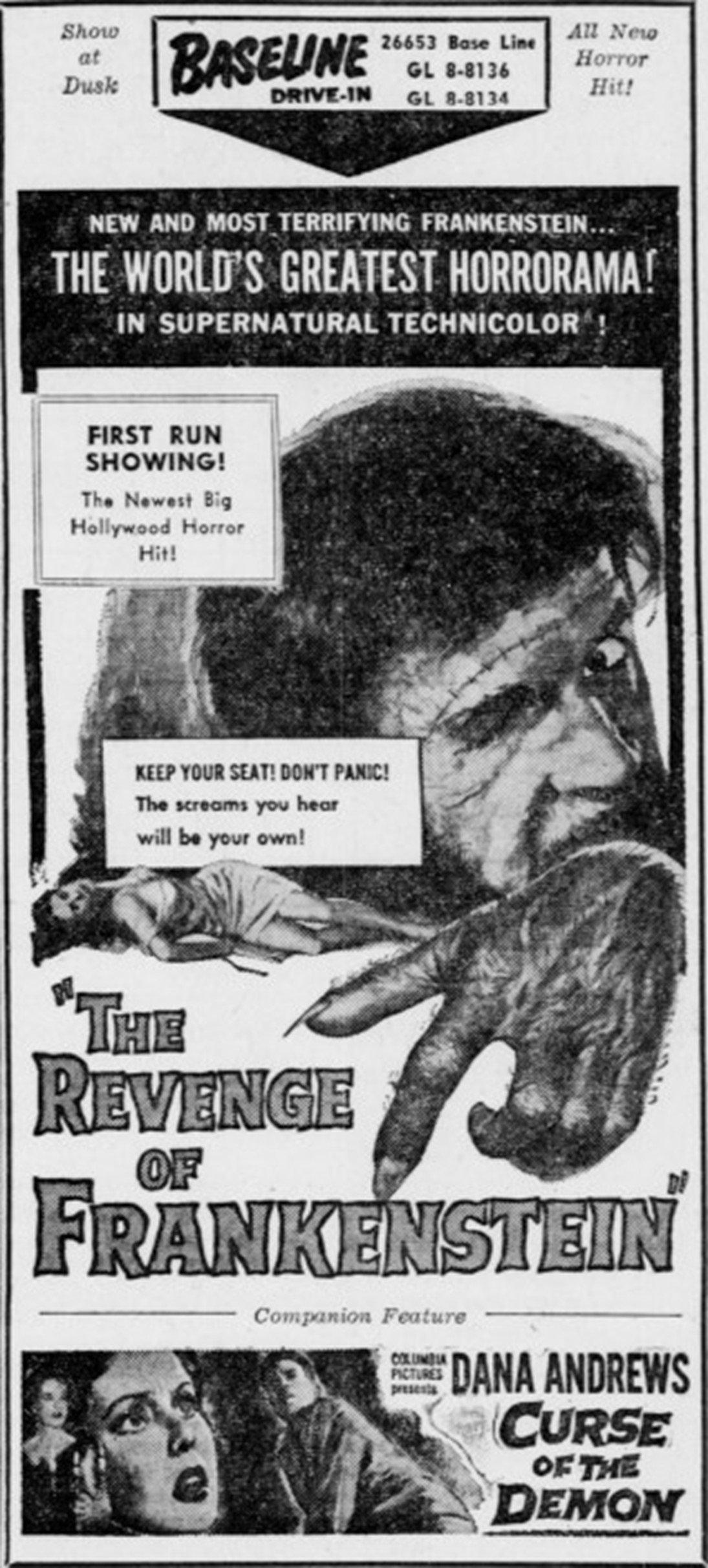
Drive-in advertisement from 1958 for The Revenge of Frankenstein and co-feature, Curse of the Demon.

According to Jimmy Sangster, James Carreras presold the film in America, taking a poster with him. When Carreras returned he approached Sangster with the project asking him to write the sequel to The Curse of Frankenstein. Sangster responded, "I killed (Baron) Frankenstein in the first film." Sangster stated that Carreras told him he had six weeks to write the project before shooting started and that "you'll think of something".

The film was shot at Bray Studios and production commenced on 6 January 1958, three days after filming wrapped on Dracula (1958), which likewise starred Peter Cushing and was directed by Terence Fisher.

Conductor and composer Leonard Salzedo was hired to write the score, and most of the regular Hammer crew returned in other roles, including Jack Asher as cinematographer, Bernard Robinson on design and Phil Leakey on make-up.

== Release ==
The film was released in the United States in June 1958 with Curse of the Demon (1957) on the lower half of the double bill.

== Novelizations ==
Three novelizations of the film were published. The first, by Jimmy Sangster (as Hurford Janes) was published by Panther Books in 1958; the second was by John Burke as part of his 1966 Pan book The Hammer Horror Film Omnibus; the third, by Shaun Hutson, was published in March 2013 (ISBN 9780099556237).

== Critical reception ==
Variety called The Revenge of Frankenstein "a high grade horror film" with "rich" production values and a script that was "well-plotted, peopled with interesting characters, aided by good performances."

Motion Picture Daily noted, "a horror picture turned out with creative skill and imagination. The most notable contribution the Hammers have made to the genre is their stunning use of color for frightening effects". Hammer Films "have demolished once and for all the theory that horror films should always be in black-and-white".

Harrison's Reports declared it "a first-rate picture of its kind."

The Monthly Film Bulletin wrote: "A contrived plot and a notable lack of pace and imagination are responsible for the failure of this lavish and painstaking production to be convincing even on the level of a horror film. Peter Cushing's stylish and diffident performance serves only to underline the farcical effects of a crude and pedestrian handling of the little legitimate horror left."

As of October 2022, The Revenge of Frankenstein held an 87% approval rating on the review aggregator website Rotten Tomatoes, based on 15 reviews.

== See also ==
- Frankenstein in popular culture
- List of films featuring Frankenstein's monster
- Frankenstein (Hammer film series)
- Hammer filmography
