= Moray Grant =

Scottish cinematographer (1917–1977)

Moray Grant (1917–1977) was a Scottish cinematographer. Born 13 November 1917, near Forres, Morayshire. Full name Robert David Moray Grant. Married Antoinette Christiansen, oldest daughter of Arthur Chritiansen, editor of the Daily Express, in March 1951, in Kensington, London. One daughter.

== Selected filmography ==
- The Trojan Brothers (1946)
- Counterblast (1948)
- The Three Weird Sisters (1948)
- The Jack of Diamonds (1949)
- Night Was Our Friend (1951)
- The Dark Light (1951)
- An Appointment in London (1952)
- Conflict of Wings (1954)
- Up the Creek (1958)
- The Vampire Lovers (1970)
- I, Monster (1971)
