= Jimmy Sangster =

British screenwriter and director (1927–2011)

- Sangster, c. 1958
- Born: James Henry Kinmel Sangster; 2 December 1927; Kinmel Bay, Denbighshire, Wales
- Died: 19 August 2011 (aged 83); London, England
- Education: Ewell Castle School
- Occupations: Screenwriter; film director
- Years active: 1955–2000
- Spouses: Monica Hustler (m. 1950; div. 1968); Sandra Lee Nadeau (m. 1972, divorced); Mary Peach (m. 1995)
- Children: 1

James Henry Kinmel Sangster (2 December 1927 – 19 August 2011) was a Welsh screenwriter and film director, best known for his work on the initial horror films made by Hammer Film Productions, including The Curse of Frankenstein (1957) and Dracula (1958).

== Early life ==
The son of an estate agent, Sangster was born in Kimmel Bay, North Wales and was educated at Ewell Castle School in Surrey, and Llandaff Cathedral School in Cardiff. He began his film career, aged 16, as a clapper-boy.

After service with the RAF, he worked as a third assistant director on Ealing Studios productions, then joined Exclusive Studios (later Hammer Films) in 1949.

== Career ==
Sangster originally worked as a production assistant at Hammer Films, as well as being an assistant director, second unit director and production manager. After Hammer's success with The Quatermass Xperiment, he was approached to write X the Unknown, to which he replied "I'm not a writer. I'm a production manager." According to him, Hammer Films' response was: "Well, you come up with a couple of ideas and if we like it, we'll pay you. If we don't like it, we won't pay you. You're being paid as a production manager, so you can't complain." Sangster later turned to direction with The Horror of Frankenstein and Lust for a Vampire (both 1970) for the studio, but with far less success. His third (and last) film as director was Fear in the Night (1972), which resurrected the psychological woman-in-peril thriller he had begun with his script for Taste of Fear (1961). All three of the films he directed featured actor Ralph Bates, a friend of Sangster's and one of Hammer's better-known performers for the company during the 1970s.

Sangster scripted and produced two films for Bette Davis, The Nanny (1965) and The Anniversary (1968). His other scriptwriting credits included The Siege of Sidney Street (1960), which starred Donald Sinden and in which Sangster appeared as Winston Churchill. His many television screenwriting credits include Kolchak: The Night Stalker, Movin' On, The Magician, B. J. and the Bear, Most Wanted, Ironside, McCloud, The Six Million Dollar Man and Wonder Woman.

He is also the author of the novels Touchfeather; Touchfeather, Too; Foreign Exchange; Private I (a.k.a. The Spy Killer); Snowball; Hardball; and Blackball; all of which have been republished by Brash Books. His other books include the novel Your Friendly Neighborhood Death Peddler, the non-fiction memoir Do You Want it Good or Tuesday? and the 2003 screenwriting manual, Screenwriting: Techniques for Success. In 2019, Brash Books announced the discovery of an unpublished Sangster novel, Fireball, which they released in 2020.

== Personal life ==
Sangster died at his home in Kensington, London on 19 August 2011. He was survived by his third wife, actress Mary Peach; a son from an earlier marriage, Mark James Sangster; and two grandchildren, Claire and Ian Sangster.

== Filmography ==
As a director

Year	Title	Notes
1970	The Horror of Frankenstein	Also producer and co-writer
1971	Lust for a Vampire	
1972	Fear in the Night	Also producer and writer

As a screenwriter

Year	Title	Notes
1955	A Man on the Beach	
1956	X the Unknown	
1957	The Curse of Frankenstein	
1958	Dracula	
1958	The Revenge of Frankenstein	
1958	Intent to Kill	
1958	The Snorkel	
1958	Blood of the Vampire	
1958	The Crawling Eye	
1959	Jack the Ripper	
1959	The Man Who Could Cheat Death	
1959	The Mummy	
1960	The Brides of Dracula	
1960	The Siege of Sidney Street	
1961	The Hellfire Club	
1961	The Terror of the Tongs	
1961	Scream of Fear	
1962	The Pirates of Blood River	
1962	Paranoiac	
1963	Maniac	
1964	Nightmare	
1964	The Devil-Ship Pirates	
1964	Traitor's Gate	
1965	Hysteria	
1965	The Nanny	
1966	Dracula: Prince of Darkness	As John Sansom
1967	Deadlier Than the Male	
1968	The Anniversary	
1969	The Spy Killer	Television film
1970	Foreign Exchange	Television film
1970	Crescendo	
1970	The Horror of Frankenstein	Co-writer; also director and producer
1971	A Taste of Evil	Television film
1972	Fear in the Night	Also director and producer
1972	Whoever Slew Auntie Roo?	
1973	Scream, Pretty Peggy	Television film
1973	Maneater	Television film
1977	Good Against Evil	Television film
1978	The Legacy	
1979	The Country Western Murders	Television film
1979	The Billion Dollar Threat	Television film
1979	Ebony, Ivory and Jade	Television film
1980	Phobia	
1980	Once Upon a Spy	Television film
1981	No Place to Hide	Television film
1981	The Devil and Max Devlin	
1984	The Toughest Man in the World	Television film
1985	North Beach and Rawhide	Television film
