= Veronica Carlson =

English actress (1944–2022)

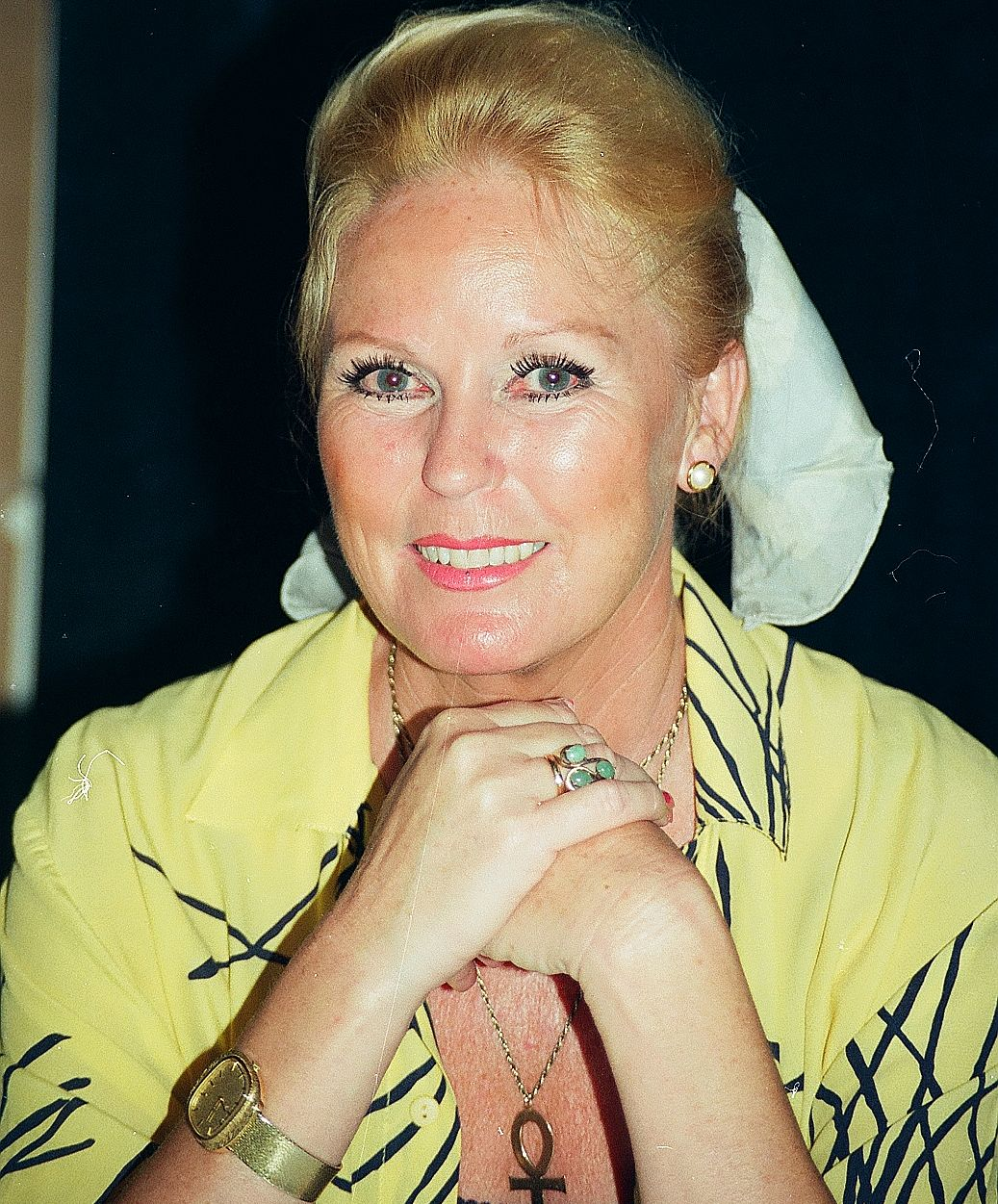
- Carlson in 1995
- Born: Veronica Mary Glazier; 18 September 1944; Emley, West Riding of Yorkshire, England
- Died: 27 February 2022 (aged 77); Bluffton, South Carolina, U.S.
- Occupations: Actress; model
- Spouse: Sidney Love (m. 1974; died 2016)
- Children: 3

Veronica Carlson (born Veronica Mary Glazier; 18 September 1944 – 27 February 2022) was a British actress and model who was known for her roles in Hammer horror films. In 2019, she was inducted into the Rondo Hatton Classic Horror Awards' Monster Kid Hall of Fame.

== Life and career ==
Carlson was born in Emley, West Riding of Yorkshire, England, as Veronica Mary Glazier, the daughter of Edith (Allatt), a housemaid, and William Glazier, an RAF officer. Carlson spent most of her childhood in West Germany where her father was stationed. She attended the Thetford Girls' School, Lady Verney High School, West Wycombe and later the High Wycombe College of Art and Technology, where she studied art. It was here that she caught the acting bug, and she participated in college reviews and operettas.

In her mid-twenties, Carlson played a few minor parts in films and television programmes. She was still at college when she auditioned for the Morecambe and Wise film, The Magnificent Two. She had heard that they needed someone who knew judo, and as she had some basic moves she tried out. Most of the other girls were wearing bikinis, although there was one other person in judo garb. Carlson threw her over her shoulder, and she was given the job.

James Carreras, the head of Hammer Films, saw one of her photographs in a newspaper and offered her a role opposite Christopher Lee in Dracula Has Risen from the Grave (1968). She starred in two further Hammer Horror films, Frankenstein Must Be Destroyed (1969) and The Horror of Frankenstein (1970). She starred alongside Peter Cushing, who treated her with a lot of kindness and respect. She said that she found working in Hammer Horror like being part of a big warm family.

She also appeared in the Randall and Hopkirk (Deceased) episode "The Ghost Who Saved the Bank at Monte Carlo" in 1969, an episode of The Saint ("The Man who Gambled with Life"(3rd last ep.)) with Roger Moore, and an episode of Department S ("The Double Death of Charlie Crippen").

Carlson was one of the four main characters in the TV thriller series Spyder's Web (1972), along with Anthony Ainley, Roger Lloyd-Pack, and Patricia Cutts. She had a small role in a 1975 episode of Public Eye playing Ingrid, the German girlfriend of Knaggs, a wanted bankrobber/gangster, played by Ray Lonnen.

Carlson went into semi-retirement after marrying and moving to the United States. Giving up on acting was not her intention, but she found that there was an increasing amount of nudity in the industry, which was something she was not prepared to do due to her strict upbringing. In later life she lived in South Carolina, with her husband and three children, where she worked as a professional painter. She emerged from a 24 year retirement to star in the 2019 film House of the Gorgon, alongside fellow Hammer film stars Caroline Munro, Martine Beswick, and Christopher Neame. She also enjoyed meeting fans at film conventions in later years.

Carlson died on 27 February 2022 at her home in Bluffton, South Carolina, aged 77.

== Filmography ==
Film
Title	Year	Role	Notes
1967	Casino Royale	Tall Blonde	Uncredited
1967	The Magnificent Two	Revolutionary	Uncredited
1967	Smashing Time	Movie Actress at Premiere	
1968	Hammerhead	Ulla	
1968	Dracula Has Risen from the Grave	Maria	
1969	Frankenstein Must Be Destroyed	Anna Spengler	
1969	The Best House in London	Lily	Uncredited
1969	Crossplot	Dinah	
1970	Pussycat, Pussycat, I Love You	Liz	
1970	The Horror of Frankenstein	Elizabeth Heiss	
1974	Vampira	Ritva	
1975	The Ghoul	Daphne	
1994	Black Easter	Psychiatrist	
1995	Freakshow	Grace Harmsworth	
2016	Stellar Quasar and the Scrolls of Dadelia	Sayang	
2019	House of the Gorgon	Anna Banning	
2021	Night of the Devil		Short film
TBA	The Rectory	Lady Whitehouse	

Television
Title	Year	Role	Notes
1968	ITV Playhouse	Sally	"The Photographer" (S1E18)
1969	The Saint	Vanessa Longman	"The Man Who Gambled with Life" (S6E18)
1969	Department S	Gina	"The Double Death of Charlie Crippen" (S2E20)
1969	Randall and Hopkirk (Deceased)	Suzanne	"The Ghost Who Saved the Bank of Monte Carlo" (S1E11)
1971	Hine	Amanda	"Everything I Am I Owe" (S1EP12)
1972	Spyder's Web	Wallis Ackroyd	Season 1 (main role, all 13 episodes)
1975	Public Eye	Ingrid Borg	"Hard Times" (S7E7)
