= Frankenstein Must Be Destroyed =

1969 British film by Terence Fisher

- Theatrical release poster by Tom Chantrell
- Directed by: Terence Fisher
- Screenplay by: Bert Batt
- Story by: Anthony Nelson Keys; Bert Batt
- Based on: Victor Frankenstein by Mary Shelley
- Produced by: Anthony Nelson Keys
- Starring: Peter Cushing; Simon Ward; Veronica Carlson; Thorley Walters; Freddie Jones; Maxine Audley
- Cinematography: Arthur Grant
- Edited by: Gordon Hales
- Music by: James Bernard
- Production company: Hammer Film Productions
- Distributed by: Warner-Pathé Distributors
- Release dates: 8 June 1969 (UK); 11 February 1970 (US)
- Running time: 101 minutes
- Country: United Kingdom
- Language: English
- Budget: £186,331
- Box office: 586,439 admissions (France)

Frankenstein Must Be Destroyed is a 1969 British horror film directed by Terence Fisher for Hammer Films, starring Peter Cushing, Freddie Jones, Veronica Carlson and Simon Ward. The film is the fifth in a series of Hammer films focusing on Baron Victor Frankenstein, who, in this entry, terrorises those around him in a bid to uncover the secrets of Dr. Frederick Brandt, a former associate confined to a lunatic asylum.

It marked the final movie by Warner Bros.-Seven Arts to be released under Warner Bros. Pictures when the company was acquired by Kinney National Company.

== Plot ==
Dr. Heidecke is decapitated by a masked man while a thief breaks into an underground laboratory. The masked man enters the lab, carrying the severed head, and fights the thief, who escapes in horror. The man unmasks himself and is revealed to be Baron Victor Frankenstein. The thief goes to the police station to report the severed head to Inspector Frisch. Victor, under the alias Mr Fenner, rents a room at a boarding house run by landlady Anna Spengler. Anna's fiancé Karl Holst is a doctor at the asylum where Victor's former collaborator, Dr Frederick Brandt, was committed after going insane.

After discovering Karl has been stealing narcotics in order to support Anna's ailing mother, Victor reveals his true identity and blackmails Karl into helping him kidnap Brandt so he can get the secret formula of his experiment. While stealing equipment from a warehouse for Victor's new lab, Karl and the Baron are caught by the guard. Karl panics and stabs him. Victor, now with a further hold on Karl, uses him and Anna to kidnap Brandt. They take him back to the house and build a lab in the basement. Karl confides to Anna about killing the guard and begs her to leave, fearing she may go to prison for being an accessory to a murderer, but she refuses.

Meanwhile, Brandt has a heart attack, prompting Victor and Karl to kidnap the asylum's administrator, Professor Richter, to transplant Brandt's brain into his body. That night, while Anna is getting ready for bed, Victor enters her room and rapes her. The next day, Victor and Karl succeed in transplanting Brandt's brain into Richter's body and bury Brandt's body in the garden. Brandt's wife Ella recognises Victor in the street and confronts him about her husband's kidnapping. Victor assures her he has cured her husband's mental illness but does not let her see him. She refuses to believe him and goes to Frisch.

While the creature recovers, Victor and the lovers relocate to a deserted manor house when the police begin to close in. In the lab, the creature awakes and is horrified by his appearance. He scares Anna, who stabs him, causing him to escape. Victor returns and finds the creature gone. In a rage, he fatally stabs Anna and goes after the creature. The creature makes it to his former home, but Ella refuses to accept him as her husband. Wanting revenge on Victor and knowing the Baron will eventually track him there, the creature allows Ella to go free and pours paraffin around the house.

Victor soon arrives, with Karl following. Inside the house, the creature makes fires to trap him. Victor finds the papers of discovery and flees, but is ambushed by Karl, and they fight. The creature emerges, knocks Karl out and carries a screaming Victor into the burning house, where they both presumably die.

== Cast ==
- Peter Cushing as Baron Victor Frankenstein
- Simon Ward as Dr. Karl Holst
- Veronica Carlson as Anna Spengler
- Freddie Jones as Professor Richter/The Creature
- George Pravda as Dr. Frederick Brandt
- Maxine Audley as Ella Brandt
- Thorley Walters as Inspector Frisch
- Windsor Davies as Police Sergeant
- Allan Surtees as Police Sergeant
- Geoffrey Bayldon as Police Doctor
- Colette O'Neil as Madwoman
- Frank Middlemass as Plumber
- Norman Shelley as Pipe Smoker
- Michael Gover as Newspaper Reader
- George Belbin as Chess Player
- Peter Copley as Principal
- Jim Collier as Dr. Heidecke
- Harold Goodwin as Burglar
- Meadows White as Night Watchman

== Production ==
The scene where Victor Frankenstein rapes Anna Spengler was filmed over the objections of both Peter Cushing and Veronica Carlson, and director Terence Fisher, who halted it when he felt enough was enough. It was not in the original script, but the scene was added at the insistence of Hammer executive James Carreras, who was under pressure to keep the American distributors happy.

The scenes featuring Thorley Walters as Inspector Frisch were also late additions to the original script; they have been described as unnecessary, adding an unwelcome element of comedy into the suspenseful story and also making the film too long.

== Welsh version ==
In 1978, the Welsh television station HTV Cymru/Wales broadcast a version dubbed into the Welsh language called Rhaid Dinistrio Frankenstein, a more-or-less literal translation of the English title. It was rebroadcast on the new Welsh language channel S4C on its launch in 1982.

== Reception ==
Variety called the film "a good-enough example of its low-key type, with artwork rather better than usual (less obvious backcloths, etc.) a minimum of artless dialogue, good lensing by Arthur Grant and a solid all round cast."

The Monthly Film Bulletin called it "the most spirited Hammer horror in some time. The crudities still remain, of course, but the talk of transplants and drugs seem to have injected new life into the continuing story of Baron Frankenstein."

The Radio Times Guide to Films gave the film 3/5 stars, writing that the film: "is graced by an incisive performance from Peter Cushing, up to his old tricks as the Baron performing brain transplants. Freddie Jones is astonishing as the anguished victim of the transplant, whose wife fails to recognise him and rejects him, prompting a revenge plan. The gothic gore is once more directed with spirited skill and economy by Terence Fisher (his fourth in the series)."

Leslie Halliwell said: "Spirited but decidely unpleasant addition to the cycle, made more so by a genuine note of pathos."

Frankenstein Must Be Destroyed currently holds an average 70% on Rotten Tomatoes.

== See also ==
- Frankenstein in popular culture
- List of films featuring Frankenstein's monster
- Frankenstein (Hammer film series)
- Hammer filmography
