= Arthur Grant (cinematographer) =

British cinematographer (1915–1972)

- Born: 1915; Surrey, England
- Died: 1972
- Occupation: Cinematographer

Arthur Grant B.S.C. (1915–1972) was a British cinematographer. He succeeded Jack Asher as regular Director of Photography for Hammer Film Productions. His films for Hammer included Shadow of the Cat (1961), The Curse of the Werewolf (1961), The Phantom of the Opera (1962), The Plague of the Zombies (1966) and The Devil Rides Out (1968). His final film for the studio was Demons of the Mind in 1972.

== Selected filmography ==
- Self Made Lady (1932)
- Loyal Heart (1946)
- I'll Turn to You (1946)
- The Second Mate (1950)
- Conflict of Wings (1954)
- The End of the Road (1954)
- Not Wanted on Voyage (1957)
- Danger Within (1959)
- Make Mine a Million (1959)
- Cone of Silence (1960)
- Hell Is a City (1960)
- Cash on Demand (1961)
- Jigsaw (1962)
- The Damned (1963)
- Paranoiac (1963)
- The Tomb of Ligeia (1965)
- The Reptile (1966)
- Quatermass and the Pit (1967)
- Frankenstein Must Be Destroyed (1969)
- Demons of the Mind (1972)
