= Dracula (Hammer film series) =

British horror film series

- Directed by: Terence Fisher (1–3); Freddie Francis (4); Peter Sasdy (5); Roy Ward Baker (6); Alan Gibson (7–8); Roy Ward Baker & Chang Cheh (9)
- Screenplay by: Jimmy Sangster (1–3); Anthony Hinds (2–6); Peter Bryan & Edward Percy (2); Don Houghton (7–9)
- Produced by: Anthony Hinds (1–2); Anthony Nelson Keys (3); Aida Young (4–6); Michael Carreras & Josephine Douglas (7); Roy Skeggs (8); Don Houghton & Vee King Shaw (9)
- Starring: Christopher Lee (1, 3–8); Peter Cushing (1-2, 7–9); John Forbes-Robertson & David de Keyser (9)
- Edited by: Bill Lenny (1); Alfred Cox (2); Chris Barnes (3, 5, 8–9); Spencer Reeve (4); James Needs (6–7)
- Music by: James Bernard (1, 3–6, 9); Malcolm Williamson (2); Mike Vickers (7); John Cacavas (8)
- Production companies: Hammer Film Productions (1–9); Shaw Brothers Studio (9)
- Distributed by: Rank Film Distributors (1–2); Universal International (2); Warner-Pathé Distributors (3–5); 20th Century Fox (3); Warner Bros.-Seven Arts (4); Warner Bros. Pictures (5 and 7); MGM-EMI Distributors (6); Continental Films (6); Columbia-Warner Distributors (7–9); Dynamite Entertainment (8); Shaw Brothers Studio (9)
- Running time: 797–801 minutes
- Countries: United Kingdom; China
- Languages: English; Chinese

Dracula is a British horror film series produced by Hammer Film Productions. The films are centered on Count Dracula, bringing with him a plague of vampirism, and the ensuing efforts of the heroic Van Helsing family to stop him. The series of films consists of nine installments, which stars iconic horror actor Christopher Lee as Count Dracula. The series is part of the larger Hammer horror oeuvre. Additionally, Peter Cushing plays Abraham Van Helsing in the first, second and ninth installments, while playing Lawrence and Lorrimer Van Helsing in the 7th installment and returning as Lorrimer in the 8th installment.

== List of films ==
- Dracula (1958)
  Jonathan Harker (John Van Eyssen) begets the ire of Count Dracula (Christopher Lee) after he accepts a job at the vampire's castle under false pretenses, forcing his colleague Dr. Van Helsing (Peter Cushing) to destroy the predatory villain when he targets Harker's loved ones.
- The Brides of Dracula (1960)
  Following the death of Count Dracula, the film continues the adventures of Dr. Van Helsing as he faces a different set of vampires, Baron (David Peel) and Baroness Meinster (Martita Hunt) of Transylvania.
- Dracula: Prince of Darkness (1966)
  The Kents (Barbara Shelley, Francis Matthews, Suzan Farmer and Charles Tingwell), after arriving at a tiny hamlet in the Carpathian Mountains, are diverted to the former castle of Count Dracula (Christopher Lee), where his former manservant Klove (Philip Latham) seeks to use their blood to allow his master to rise from the grave once more.
- Dracula Has Risen from the Grave (1968)
  While trying to exorcise Castle Dracula, the Monsignor (Rupert Davies) inadvertently brings Count Dracula back from the dead. Once awakened, Dracula follows the Monsignor back to his hometown, preying on the holy man's beautiful niece Maria (Veronica Carlson) and her boyfriend (Barry Andrews).
- Taste the Blood of Dracula (1970)
  After three distinguished English gentlemen (Geoffrey Keen, Peter Sallis and John Carson) accidentally resurrect Count Dracula, unknowingly killing a disciple of his (Ralph Bates) in the process, the Count seeks to avenge his dead servant by making the trio die at the hands of their own children.
- Scars of Dracula (1970)
  After a huge vampire bat drops blood on his ashes, Dracula rises again to trouble Simon (Dennis Waterman) and Sarah (Jenny Hanley), a couple on a lookout for Paul (Christopher Matthews), who had mysteriously disappeared a while back.
- Dracula A.D. 1972 (1972)
  A reboot of the series. After Lawrence Van Helsing (Peter Cushing) dispatches Dracula to his grave in 1872, the Dark Lord is raised by Johnny Alucard (Christopher Neame) 100 years later in modern London. Dracula preys on a group of young partygoers that includes the granddaughter, Jessica Van Helsing (Stephanie Beacham), of the descendant of his nemesis, Lorrimer Van Helsing.
- The Satanic Rites of Dracula (1973)
  After one of their agents is brutally murdered by a Satanic cult that includes high-ranking members of the government, the British Secret Service ask a Special Branch inspector (Michael Coles) for assistance. The inspector reunites with Lorrimer (Peter Cushing) and Jessica Van Helsing (Joanna Lumley) to unmask the cult’s mysterious leader and his plot involving a new strain of bubonic plague.
- The Legend of the 7 Golden Vampires (1974)
  Professor Abraham Van Helsing and his son (Robin Stewart) are hired later in 1904 after giving a lecture at a Chinese university to take on a group of seven sword-wielding vampires wearing gold masks, resurrected by Count Dracula (John Forbes-Robertson and David de Keyser).

== Reception ==
Film	Rotten Tomatoes
Dracula	89% (44 reviews)
The Brides of Dracula	79% (19 reviews)
Dracula: Prince of Darkness	81% (21 reviews)
Dracula Has Risen from the Grave	81% (16 reviews)
Taste the Blood of Dracula	54% (13 reviews)
Scars of Dracula	50% (8 reviews)
Dracula A.D. 1972	20% (10 reviews)
The Satanic Rites of Dracula	33% (6 reviews)
The Legend of the 7 Golden Vampires	50% (6 reviews)

== Cast and characters ==
List indicators

This section includes characters who will appear or have appeared in the series.

- An empty grey cell indicates the character was not in the film, or that the character's official presence has not yet been confirmed.
- ^{A} indicates an appearance through archival footage or audio.
- ^{U} indicates an uncredited appearance.
- ^{V} indicates a voice-only role.
- ^{Y} indicates a younger version of the character.
- ^{H} indicates an appearance as a host of another character.

Character	Dracula	The Brides of Dracula	Dracula: Prince of Darkness	Dracula Has Risen from the Grave	Taste the Blood of Dracula	Scars of Dracula	Dracula A.D. 1972	The Satanic Rites of Dracula	The Legend of the 7 Golden Vampires
Character	1958	1960	1966	1968	1970		1972	1973	1974
Count Dracula	Christopher Lee		Christopher Lee	Christopher Lee	Christopher Lee	Christopher Lee	Christopher Lee	Christopher Lee	John Forbes-Robertson David de Keyser^{V} Chan Shen^{H}
Dr. Van Helsing Dr. Lawrence Van Helsing Dr. Lorrimer Van Helsing	Peter Cushing	Peter Cushing	Peter Cushing^{U}^{A}				Peter Cushing	Peter Cushing	Peter Cushing
Klove			Philip Latham			Patrick Troughton			
Baron Meinster		David Peel							
Father Sandor (Note: Spelt "Shandor" in the Warrior comic series.)			Andrew Keir						
Monsignor Ernst Mueller				Rupert Davies					
Inspector Murray							Michael Coles	Michael Coles	
Mina Harker	Melissa Stribling								
Lucy Westenra	Carol Marsh								
Jonathan Harker	John Van Eyssen								
Arthur Holmwood	Michael Gough								
Vampire Woman	Valerie Gaunt								
Dr. John "Jack" Seward	Charles Lloyd-Pack								
Tania	Janina Faye								
Marianne Danielle		Yvonne Monlaur							
Diane Kent			Suzan Farmer						
Helen Kent			Barbara Shelley						
Maria Mueller				Veronica Carlson					
Alice Hargood					Linda Hayden				
Charles Kent			Francis Matthews (actor)						
Paul				Barry Andrews					
Paul Paxton					Anthony Corlan				
Paul Carlson						Christopher Matthews			
Simon Carlson						Dennis Waterman			
Landlord (Klausenburg)	George Woodbridge		George Woodbridge						
Landlord (Karlsbad, the village under the mountain (Note: Called Josefsbad in the novelisation of Dracula, Prince of Darkness by John Burke))				George A. Cooper		Michael Ripper			
Landlord (The Running Boar, Meinster village)		Norman Pierce							
Tania, Vampire						Anouska Hempel			
Priest				Ewan Hooper					
Priest						Michael Gwynn			
Burgomaster						Bob Todd			
Alice, Burgomaster's daughter						Delia Lindsay			
Jessica Van Helsing							Stephanie Beacham	Joanna Lumley	
Leyland Van Helsing									Robin Stewart

== Crew ==
Crew/detail	Dracula	The Brides of Dracula	Dracula: Prince of Darkness	Dracula Has Risen from the Grave	Taste the Blood of Dracula	Scars of Dracula	Dracula A.D. 1972	The Satanic Rites of Dracula	The Legend of the 7 Golden Vampires
Crew/detail	1958	1960	1966	1968	1970		1972	1973	1974
Director(s)	Terence Fisher	Terence Fisher	Terence Fisher	Freddie Francis	Peter Sasdy	Roy Ward Baker	Alan Gibson	Alan Gibson	Roy Ward Baker Chang Cheh
Producer(s)	Anthony Hinds	Anthony Hinds	Anthony Nelson Keys	Aida Young	Aida Young	Aida Young	Michael Carreras Josephine Douglas	Roy Skeggs	Don Houghton Vee King Shaw
Writer(s)	Jimmy Sangster	Jimmy Sangster, Peter Bryan & Edward Percy Anthony Hinds (uncredited)	Screenplay: Jimmy Sangster (as John Sansom) Story: Anthony Hinds (as John Elder)	Anthony Hinds	Anthony Hinds (as John Elder)	Anthony Hinds	Don Houghton	Don Houghton	Don Houghton
Composer(s)	James Bernard	Malcolm Williamson	James Bernard	James Bernard	James Bernard	James Bernard	Mike Vickers	John Cacavas	James Bernard
Editor(s)	Bill Lenny	Alfred Cox	Chris Barnes	Spencer Reeve	Chris Barnes	James Needs	James Needs	Chris Barnes	Chris Barnes
Cinematographer	Jack Asher	Jack Asher	Michael Reed	Arthur Grant	Arthur Grant	Moray Grant	Dick Bush	Brian Probyn	John Wilcox Roy Ford
Production companies	Hammer Film Productions	Hammer Film Productions	Hammer Film Productions	Hammer Film Productions	Hammer Film Productions	Hammer Film Productions	Hammer Film Productions	Hammer Film Productions	Hammer Film Productions Shaw Brothers Studio
Distributor(s)	Rank Film Distributors (UK)	Rank Film Distributors (UK)	Warner-Pathé Distributors (UK)	Warner-Pathé Distributors (UK)	Warner-Pathé Distributors (UK)	MGM-EMI Distributors (UK)	Columbia-Warner Distributors (UK)	Columbia-Warner Distributors (UK)	Columbia-Warner Distributors (UK)
Distributor(s)	Universal International (US & Worldwide)	Universal International (US & Worldwide)	20th Century Fox (US & Worldwide)	Warner Bros.-Seven Arts (US & Worldwide)	Warner Bros. Pictures (US & Worldwide)	Continental Films (US)	Warner Bros. Pictures (US & Worldwide)	Dynamite Entertainment (US) Warner Bros. Pictures (Worldwide)	Shaw Brothers Studio (Hong Kong) Dynamite Entertainment (US) Warner Bros. Pictures (Worldwide)
Runtime	82 minutes	85 minutes	90 minutes	92 minutes	91 minutes (cut, US) 95 minutes (uncut, UK)	91 minutes	96 minutes	87 minutes	83 minutes
Release date	May 7, 1958	July 7, 1960	January 9, 1966	November 7, 1968	May 7, 1970	November 8, 1970	September 28, 1972	November 3, 1973	July 11, 1974

== Legacy ==
As Count Dracula, Lee fixed the image of the fanged vampire in popular culture. Christopher Frayling writes, "Dracula introduced fangs, red contact lenses, décolletage, ready-prepared wooden stakes and—in the celebrated credits sequence—blood being spattered from off-screen over the Count's coffin." Lee also introduced a dark, brooding sexuality to the character, with Tim Stanley stating, "Lee's sensuality was subversive in that it hinted that women might quite like having their neck chewed on by a stud".

Upon publishing extracts of their screenplay for Anno Dracula in an updated version of the first book in the series, author Kim Newman revealed the film would use the likeness of Peter Cushing to represent the severed head of the deceased Van Helsing, establishing elements of the Hammer Productions Dracula film series as the backdrop for the film adaptation's events, specifically an imagined alternate ending to the 1958 Dracula film. The fourth book in the series, subtitled Johnny Alucard, follows the character of the same name originally introduced in Dracula A.D. 1972.

In 2017, a poll of 150 actors, directors, writers, producers and critics for Time Out magazine saw Dracula ranked the 65th-best British film ever. Empire magazine ranked Lee's portrayal as Count Dracula the 7th-greatest horror movie character of all time.
