= Hammer House of Horror =

1980 British horror television series

- DVD cover
- Genre: Horror
- Created by: Roy Skeggs
- Starring: various
- Theme music composer: Roger Webb
- Country of origin: United Kingdom
- No. of series: 1
- No. of episodes: 13

Production
- Producer: Hammer Film Productions/ITC Entertainment
- Running time: 54 mins (excluding commercials)

Original release
- Network: ITV
- Release: 13 September – 6 December 1980

Hammer House of Horror is a British horror anthology television series produced in Britain in 1980. Created by Hammer Films in association with Cinema Arts International and ITC Entertainment, it consists of thirteen 50-minute episodes, originally aired on ITV.

Each self-contained episode features a different kind of horror. These vary from witches, werewolves and ghosts to devil-worship and voodoo, but also include non-supernatural horror themes such as cannibalism, confinement and serial killers. In 2003 Channel 4 placed Hammer House of Horror at No. 50 in its "100 Scariest Moments" show. The clip shown was the children's party scene in "The House That Bled to Death".

Episodes were directed by Alan Gibson, Peter Sasdy and Tom Clegg, among others, and the story editor was Anthony Read. Hammer regular Peter Cushing appears in his final Hammer production in episode 7, titled "The Silent Scream".

== Episodes ==
| No. | Title | Directed by | Written by | Original release date |
|---|---|---|---|---|
| 1 | "Witching Time" | Don Leaver | Anthony Read | 13 September 1980 |
A 17th-century witch uses her craft to transport herself to the 20th century. She brings spine-chilling terror to the present-day occupants of the old farmhouse in which she lived. She puts her mark on the man now living in the farmhouse, while his wife tries to save him. Cast: Jon Finch, Patricia Quinn, Prunella Gee, Ian McCulloch, Lennard Pearce, Margaret Anderson
| 2 | "The Thirteenth Reunion" | Peter Sasdy | Jeremy Burnham | 20 September 1980 |
A reporter investigating a health farm stumbles upon a horrifying truth behind a secret society that is connected to it, and must now fear for her life. Cast: Michael Latimer, Julia Foster, Dinah Sheridan, Richard Pearson, Norman Bird, Warren Clarke, Kevin Stoney, Gerard Kelly, James Cosmo, George Innes
| 3 | "Rude Awakening" | Peter Sasdy | Gerald Savory | 27 September 1980 |
A lecherous estate agent has recurring dreams about his seductive secretary, a mysterious house and an even more mysterious encouragement to murder his wife. Cast: Denholm Elliott, Lucy Gutteridge, James Laurenson, Pat Heywood, Gareth Armstrong, Eleanor Summerfield
| 4 | "Growing Pains" | Francis Megahy | Nicholas Palmer | 4 October 1980 |
After the death of their young son, a scientist and his wife adopt a new son, but it coincides with a series of odd events and disasters for the father's research. Cast: Gary Bond, Barbara Kellerman, Norman Beaton, Geoffrey Beevers, Tariq Yunus
| 5 | "The House that Bled to Death" | Tom Clegg | David Lloyd | 11 October 1980 |
After buying it for a good price, a couple and their young daughter move into a house that was the scene of a macabre murder. A series of terrifying events eventually force them to flee for their lives, but all is not as it seems. Cast: Nicholas Ball, Rachel Davies, Brian Croucher, Patricia Maynard, Milton Johns
| 6 | "Charlie Boy" | Robert Young | Bernie Cooper, Francis Megahy | 18 October 1980 |
An ancient African idol is discovered – too late – to have remarkable powers. Cast: Leigh Lawson, Marius Goring, Angela Bruce, Frances Cuka, Michael Culver, Jeff Rawle, David Healy, Janet Fielding
| 7 | "The Silent Scream" | Alan Gibson | Francis Essex | 25 October 1980 |
An elderly pet shop owner, who was a former Nazi concentration camp guard, is intent on continuing experiments on human victims. His plan is to create prisons with no bars, for which he captures a former prison inmate and his wife. Cast: Peter Cushing, Brian Cox, Elaine Donnelly
| 8 | "Children of the Full Moon" | Tom Clegg | Murray Smith | 1 November 1980 |
A husband and wife head off on holiday to the West Country, but get stranded. They find sanctuary at a house in the woods, where a woman cares for a number of children; the husband believes these to be werewolves. Cast: Diana Dors, Christopher Cazenove, Celia Gregory, Robert Urquhart
| 9 | "Carpathian Eagle" | Francis Megahy | Bernie Cooper, Francis Megahy | 8 November 1980 |
A young woman, convinced she possesses the reincarnated spirit of a murderess, uses her sexuality to seek out new victims to fulfil an ancient prophecy for death. Features Pierce Brosnan in one of his early screen roles. Cast: Suzanne Danielle, Anthony Valentine, Siân Phillips, Jeffry Wickham, W. Morgan Sheppard, Pierce Brosnan
| 10 | "Guardian of the Abyss" | Don Sharp | David Fisher | 15 November 1980 |
An antiques dealer gets caught up in a cult of human sacrifice which seeks to conjure Choronzon when he unwittingly gains possession of John Dee's mirror with mysterious evil powers. Cast: Ray Lonnen, Barbara Ewing, John Carson, Rosalyn Landor, Paul Darrow
| 11 | "Visitor from the Grave" | Peter Sasdy | John Elder | 22 November 1980 |
A psychologically fragile woman accidentally kills an intruder who is about to hurt her. Her boyfriend buries the body in the woods, but she continues to see the man in various places; this leads her to seek help from a psychic. Worse is to follow as she becomes the victim of a macabre plot. Cast: Kathryn Leigh Scott, Gareth Thomas, Simon MacCorkindale, Mia Nadasi, Stanley Lebor
| 12 | "The Two Faces of Evil" | Alan Gibson | Ranald Graham | 29 November 1980 |
Setting off on a holiday, a family gives a lift to a sinister hitchhiker. After the car crashes, one man is dead and one man is injured. But which one? Cast: Gary Raymond, Anna Calder-Marshall, Philip Latham, Jenny Laird, Brenda Cowling
| 13 | "The Mark of Satan" | Don Leaver | Don Shaw | 6 December 1980 |
A worker in a hospital mortuary becomes convinced that a conspiracy of evil has chosen him as the devil's disciple. Those around him remain sceptical, believing that his rantings are a sign of insanity rather than a desperate cry for help from an innocent soul marked for Satan. Cast: Peter McEnery, Emrys James, Georgina Hale, Peter Birrel, Conrad Phillips

== Home release ==
The series was released on DVD in the UK (region 2) in October 2002 by ITV Studios. It was released as a four-disc set featuring all 13 episodes, and includes stills galleries and cast biographies as extras. The episodes are in a different order on the DVD.

In the U.S., A&E Home Entertainment, under license from Carlton International Media Limited, released the complete series on Region 1 DVD in 2001.

A re-mastered version was released in the US (region 1) on 11 September 2012 by Synapse Films. It was released as a five-disc set, and features an animated stills gallery, episode introductions from film historian Shane M. Dallman, and featurettes including Grave Recollections: A Visit With Kathryn Leigh Scott and Hammer Housekeeping: A Visit With Mia Nadasi.

Having completed a high-definition restoration of the series, the UK's Network imprint released Hammer House of Horror for the first time on HD Blu-ray (Region B locked) in October 2017.
