= Dracula Has Risen from the Grave =

1968 British film by Freddie Francis

- British theatrical release poster
- Directed by: Freddie Francis
- Screenplay by: John Elder
- Based on: Count Dracula by Bram Stoker
- Produced by: Aida Young
- Starring: Christopher Lee; Rupert Davies; Veronica Carlson; Barbara Ewing; Barry Andrews; Ewan Hooper
- Cinematography: Arthur Grant
- Edited by: Spencer Reeve
- Music by: James Bernard
- Production company: Hammer Films
- Distributed by: Warner-Pathé Distributors (UK); Warner Bros.-Seven Arts (US)
- Release dates: 24 November 1968 (UK); 6 February 1969 (US)
- Running time: 92 minutes
- Country: United Kingdom
- Language: English
- Budget: £175,000

Dracula Has Risen from the Grave is a 1968 British supernatural horror film directed by Freddie Francis and produced by Hammer Film Productions. It is the fourth entry in Hammer's Dracula series, and the third to feature Christopher Lee as Count Dracula. The film stars Rupert Davies as Monsignor Ernest Mueller, a clergyman who exorcises Dracula's castle, and in doing so, unwittingly resurrects the Count from the dead.

Dracula Has Risen from the Grave also stars Veronica Carlson, Barry Andrews, Barbara Ewing, Ewan Hooper and Michael Ripper. It was followed by Taste the Blood of Dracula in 1970.

== Plot ==
In an East European village, a young altar boy discovers the corpse of a young woman crammed inside a church bell, another victim of Count Dracula. One year later 1896, following the events of the previous film, Dracula has been destroyed. Monsignor Ernst Mueller comes to the village on a routine visit only to find the altar boy is now a frightened mute and the priest has lost his faith. The villagers refuse to attend Mass at the church because the shadow of Dracula's castle touches it. To bring to an end the villagers' fears, Mueller climbs to the castle to exorcise it.

The terrified priest follows only partway up the mountain, and Mueller continues alone. As he exorcises the castle, attaching a large metal cross to its gate, a thunderstorm occurs. The fleeing priest stumbles and is knocked unconscious when his head strikes a rock. The blood from the head wound trickles into a frozen stream through a crack in the ice and onto the lips of Dracula, reviving him. Mueller returns to the village, reassures the villagers, and returns to his home city of Kleinenberg, where he lives with his widowed sister-in-law, Anna.

Unknown to Mueller, Dracula takes control of the priest. Furious that his castle is now barred to him, Dracula forces the enslaved priest to reveal the name of the exorcist. The priest desecrates a coffin to provide a sleeping place for Dracula and leads him to Kleinenberg, where the Count determines to take his revenge on Mueller's beautiful niece, Maria. Dracula enslaves a tavern girl named Zena. Zena almost succeeds in bringing Maria under Dracula's power, but Maria's boyfriend Paul, who lives and works in the bakery beneath the tavern, rescues her. Dracula kills Zena and orders the priest to destroy her corpse before she turns into a vampire, so the priest burns her body in the bakery ovens. The priest then helps Dracula locate Maria. Dracula climbs over the rooftops of nearby buildings, enters Maria's room, and bites her.

Mueller enters Maria's room just before Dracula has bitten the girl again and pursues a fleeing figure across the rooftops. He is knocked down by the priest. Mueller makes his way back home, where his sister-in-law cares for him. He summons Paul, knowing that he will help protect Maria because of his love for her. Mueller passes on a book, which contains the rites of protection against vampires and ways to defeat them, before he succumbs to his wounds. Paul enlists the priest, not knowing he is under Dracula's spell. Unable to break free from Dracula's influence, the priest attacks Paul as they watch over Maria, who is falling under Dracula's spell. Paul defeats the priest and forces him to lead the way to Dracula's lair. They try to stake Dracula through the heart, but the faithless priest and the atheist Paul are not able to say the required prayer, so Dracula rises and removes the stake himself. He kidnaps Maria and flees to the castle, pursued by Paul and the priest.

At the castle, Dracula orders Maria to remove the cross from the door. She throws it over the parapet into the ravine below, where it lands upright, wedged between the rocks. Paul fights Dracula on the parapet and throws him over the side, and he is impaled on the cross. The priest, freed from the vampire's influence, recites the Lord's Prayer in Latin before collapsing and Dracula perishes, dissolving into dust. Reunited with Maria and having apparently regained his Christian faith, Paul crosses himself while viewing Dracula's remains.

== Cast ==
- Christopher Lee as Count Dracula
- Veronica Carlson as Maria Mueller
- Barry Andrews as Paul
- Rupert Davies as Monsignor Ernst Mueller
- Ewan Hooper as Priest
- Barbara Ewing as Zena
- Marion Mathie as Anna Mueller
- Michael Ripper as Max
- John D. Collins as Student
- George A. Cooper as Landlord
- Chris Cunningham as Farmer
- Norman Bacon as Altar boy

== Production ==
This Hammer Dracula production was shot at Pinewood Studios situated in Iver Heath, Buckinghamshire. Missing are the approach road, coach path and moat seen in front of Castle Dracula in Dracula (1958) and Dracula: Prince of Darkness (1966). Those films were made at Bray Studios.

The film was photographed by Arthur Grant using coloured filters belonging to director Freddie Francis, also a cameraman, who used them when photographing The Innocents (1961). Whenever Count Dracula (Christopher Lee) or his castle is in a scene, the frame edges are tinged crimson, amber and yellow. Initially Terence Fisher was to direct the film, but dropped out after breaking his leg in an automobile accident; Freddie Francis stepped in. All of Ewan Hooper's dialogue is dubbed.

== Release ==
In Australia, the film was the first Hammer Dracula to be passed by the censors; the previous films Dracula and Dracula: Prince of Darkness were banned. The film was slightly censored and ran for a three-week season at Sydney's Capitol Theatre in January 1970.

== Reception ==
=== Critical ===
The Monthly Film Bulletin wrote: "The good news of the risen Count and the sight of the familiar hearse speeding by night through the Transylvanian woods will once more rally the faithful perhaps, but they may find this new adventure rather short on shock sequences. There is, though, a nice gory opening (Dracula impaled like a butterfly on a large gilt cross) and a suitably horrific finale (a bleeding corpse hanging upside-down from a church bell), and Freddie Francis has managed a few pleasing colour compositions. Connoisseurs will notice that the film is considerably more explicit than usual in revealing the sexual basis of the vampire legend. For the rest, Christopher Lee is his customary suave self as Dracula, but the acting honours really go to Barbara Ewing as the jealous Zena, who dies with an expression of triumphant and satisfied lust frozen on her face."

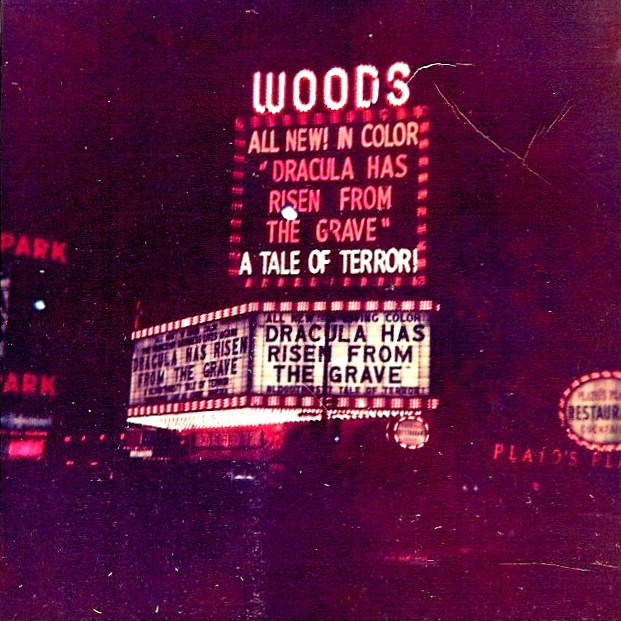
The film being shown in Chicago in 1970

Howard Thompson of The New York Times wrote: "Dracula Has Risen From The Grave. Yes, again. And judging by this junky British film in color – asplatter with catchup or paint or whatever, to simulate the Count's favorite color – he can descend again."

Variety called the film "a tired episode," adding, "The story's slight, the horror and the bloodcurdling essential to these pix is minimal and even Dracula himself appears bored at being resurrected yet again."

The Hammer Story: The Authorised History of Hammer Films called the film "a minor triumph of style over content", writing that the film "succeeds by virtue of Francis' adventurous direction".

On Rotten Tomatoes the film has an approval rating of 80% based on reviews from 15 critics.

=== Box office ===
It became Hammer's highest-grossing film.

== Home media ==
On 6 November 2007, the film was released as part of a DVD four-pack along with Dracula, Taste the Blood of Dracula and Dracula A.D. 1972.

On 6 October 2015, the film was released on Blu-ray as part of a Hammer collection pack with The Mummy, Frankenstein Must Be Destroyed, and Taste the Blood of Dracula. It was also released on Blu-ray separately.

== See also ==
- Vampire film
- Dracula (Hammer film series)
- Hammer filmography

== Sources ==
- Hearn, Marcus; Barnes, Alan (September 2007). The Hammer Story: The Authorised History of Hammer Films (limited ed.). Titan Books. ISBN 978-1-84576-185-1.
