= Taste the Blood of Dracula =

1970 film by Peter Sasdy

- Theatrical release poster
- Directed by: Peter Sasdy
- Screenplay by: John Elder
- Based on: Count Dracula by Bram Stoker
- Produced by: Aida Young
- Starring: Christopher Lee; Linda Hayden; Anthony Corlan; Geoffrey Keen; John Carson; Peter Sallis
- Cinematography: Arthur Grant
- Edited by: Chris Barnes
- Music by: James Bernard
- Production company: Hammer Films
- Distributed by: Warner-Pathé (UK); Warner Bros. Pictures (US & Worldwide)
- Release dates: 7 June 1970 (UK); 16 September 1970 (US)
- Running time: 95 minutes (UK); 91 minutes (US)
- Country: United Kingdom
- Language: English

Taste the Blood of Dracula is a 1970 British supernatural horror film produced by Hammer Film Productions. Directed by Peter Sasdy from a script by Anthony Hinds, it is the fifth installment in Hammer's Dracula series, and the fourth to star Christopher Lee as Count Dracula, the titular vampire.

Taste the Blood of Dracula was released on a double bill in the UK with Crescendo, another Hammer production. The film reached number-one in the U.S. as part of a double bill with Trog. It was followed by Scars of Dracula, also released in 1970.

== Plot ==
While travelling through Eastern Europe, a businessman named Weller is thrown from his carriage during a struggle and knocked unconscious. After regaining consciousness, he discovers it is night time. Shortly after, Weller sees a caped figure screaming in agony with a large crucifix impaling him from the back. (Note: It matches to some extent with the ending of the previous film, Dracula Has Risen from the Grave.) The figure dies and disintegrates. Examining the remains, Weller finds a ring, a cape and its clasp, with dried blood on it. On the brooch, he reads the name Dracula.

Some time later, three gentlemen, William Hargood, Samuel Paxton and Jonathon Secker— form a circle ostensibly devoted to charitable work. In reality, they visit brothels. One night, they are intrigued by a young man who bursts into the brothel and is immediately tended to after snapping his fingers. The gentlemen turns out to be Lord Courtley, who was disinherited by his father for celebrating a Black Mass years ago.

Courtley takes the three to the Café Royal. He promises them experiences they will never forget if they visit Weller and purchase from him Dracula's ring, cloak and dried blood. Having done so, the three meet with Courtley at an abandoned church for a ceremony during which he puts the blood into goblets and mixes it with drops of his own blood, telling the men to drink. They refuse, so he drinks the blood himself, screams and falls to the ground. As he grabs for Hargood's legs, all three gentlemen kick and beat him to death. They then flee, and Courtley's abandoned body transforms into Dracula, who vows that his servant's killers will be destroyed.

Meanwhile, Hargood, a drunk, treats his daughter Alice harshly, furious that she continues to see Paul, Paxton's son. Dracula hypnotizes Alice, making her pick up a shovel and kill her father. The next day, Hargood is found dead and Alice is missing. At her father's funeral, she attracts the attention of Paul's sister Lucy. That night, the two enter the church, and Alice introduces her to a dark figure. Assuming him to be Alice's lover, Lucy is greeted by Dracula, who turns her into a vampire.

With Hargood dead and Alice and Lucy missing, Paxton teams-up with Secker and visits the church. Courtley's corpse is missing, but they discover Lucy asleep in a coffin with marks on her throat. Realizing she is a vampire, Secker tries to stake her, but Paxton shoots him in the arm, forcing him to flee, and weeps over the body. When he develops the courage to stake her, she awakens, and Dracula appears. Alice pins Paxton down and Lucy kills him with a wooden stake. That night, Secker's son Jeremy sees Lucy, his fiancée, and approaches her. She bites his throat, enslaving him while Dracula watches. The vampire Jeremy then stabs his father to death on Lucy's orders. When she starts begging for his approval, Dracula drains her dry and leaves her destroyed. Back at the church, Dracula prepares to bite Alice but a cock crows, and he returns to his coffin.

Secker's body causes Jeremy's arrest. While trying to defend Jeremy, Paul finds a letter in which Secker instructs him on how to fight the vampires. Following Secker's instructions, Paul goes to the church and finds Lucy's exsanguinated body, floating in a lake. He bars the door at the church with a cross and clears the altar of Black Mass instruments, replacing them with the proper materials. He calls for Alice, who appears with Dracula. Paul confronts Dracula with a cross but Alice, still entranced, disarms him. Dracula dismisses her and tries to leave, but is prevented by the cross barring the door. His retreat is also barred by a cross which an angry and disappointed Alice threw to the floor. He climbs the balcony and throws objects at Paul and Alice, before backing into a stained glass window depicting a cross. He breaks the glass but sees the changed surroundings and hears the Lord's Prayer recited in Latin. Overwhelmed by the power of the newly re-sanctified church, Dracula falls to the altar and dissolves back into dust. With the vampire destroyed, Paul and Alice leave.

== Cast ==
- Christopher Lee as Count Dracula
- Anthony Corlan as Paul Paxton
- Linda Hayden as Alice Hargood
- Geoffrey Keen as William Hargood
- Ralph Bates as Lord Courtley
- Peter Sallis as Samuel Paxton
- John Carson as Jonathon Secker
- Isla Blair as Lucy Paxton
- Martin Jarvis as Jeremy Secker
- Gwen Watford as Martha Hargood
- Roy Kinnear as Weller
- Michael Ripper as Inspector Cobb
- Russell Hunter as Felix
- Shirley Jaffe as Betty
- Keith Marsh as Father
- Peter May as Son
- Madeline Smith as Dolly
- Reginald Barratt as Vicar

== Production ==
Taste the Blood of Dracula was originally written without Dracula appearing at all. With Christopher Lee's increasing reluctance to reprise the role, Hammer intended to replace Lee and Dracula in the franchise with the Lord Courtley character played by Ralph Bates, who would rise as a vampire after his death and seek revenge on William Hargood (Geoffrey Keen), Samuel Paxton (Peter Sallis) and Jonathon Secker (John Carson). Warner Bros. Pictures refused to release the film if it lacked an appearance by Dracula; this prompted Hammer to convince Lee to return, with Dracula replacing the resurrected Courtley.

The scenes of the gentlemen's visit to the local brothel were heavily edited on the film's original release. They are fully reinstated on the DVD release. An alternative version of the scene where Lucy Paxton (Isla Blair) bites Jeremy Secker (Martin Jarvis) was filmed, with the young man actually becoming a vampire. This scene was not used, possibly to avoid complicating the plot further with the introduction of another vampire.

== Release ==
=== Certification ===
In its original United States release, it was rated GP (general audience, parental guidance suggested—the forerunner to the later PG rating), but when it was re-released to DVD, it was rated R for sexual content/nudity and brief violence.

=== Critical reception ===
Variety wrote that director Peter Sasdy had directed his first feature film "effectively, leavening stock situations with the occasional shock twist, and has kept the Dracula pix atmosphere well." The review noted that "Christopher Lee can now play Dracula in his sleep and, in this pic, looks occasionally as if he is doing so." The Monthly Film Bulletin called it "absolutely routine Hammer horror, except that the script is even more laboured than usual. Dracula himself is virtually reduced to an onlooker while the happy families decimate each other at his behest, and the only moment of inspiration is when a would-be vampire stalker is himself staked by two gleeful vampires." John C. Mahoney of the Los Angeles Times wrote that the film was "superior in production, performance, story and atmosphere to the recent Dracula Has Risen from the Grave. In the title role, Christopher Lee seems to take new interest in the role with a terrifyingly bloodshot performance."

The Hammer Story: The Authorised History of Hammer Films called the film "the finest genuine Dracula sequel in the entire [Hammer Dracula] series." It holds a 54% score on Rotten Tomatoes based on 12 reviews.

=== Home media ===
On 6 November 2007, the movie was released in a film pack along with Dracula, Dracula Has Risen from the Grave and Dracula A.D. 1972. On 6 October 2015, the movie was released in a Hammer collection pack on Blu-ray along with Dracula Has Risen from the Grave, Frankenstein Must Be Destroyed and The Mummy. It was also released on Blu-ray separately.

== See also ==
- Vampire film
- Dracula (Hammer film series)
- Hammer filmography
