= Dracula (1958 film) =

Horror film directed by Terence Fisher

- UK theatrical release poster by Bill Wiggins
- Directed by: Terence Fisher
- Screenplay by: Jimmy Sangster
- Based on: Dracula (1897 novel) by Bram Stoker
- Produced by: Anthony Hinds
- Starring: Peter Cushing; Michael Gough; Melissa Stribling; Christopher Lee
- Cinematography: Jack Asher
- Edited by: Bill Lenny
- Music by: James Bernard
- Color process: Technicolor
- Production company: Hammer Film Productions
- Distributed by: Rank Film Distributors (UK); Universal-International (International)
- Release dates: 8 May 1958 (Milwaukee, premiere); 16 June 1958 (London)
- Running time: 82 minutes
- Country: United Kingdom
- Language: English
- Budget: £81,412
- Box office: $3.5 million (worldwide rentals)

Dracula (released in the United States as Horror of Dracula) is a 1958 British Gothic horror film directed by Terence Fisher and written by Jimmy Sangster, based on Bram Stoker's 1897 novel. The first in the series of Hammer Horror films starring Christopher Lee as Count Dracula, the film also features Peter Cushing as Doctor Van Helsing, along with Michael Gough, Melissa Stribling, Carol Marsh, and John Van Eyssen. It was the first vampire movie ever to be shot in colour.

Production began at Bray Studios on 17 November 1957 with an investment of £81,000. As Count Dracula, Lee fixed the image of the fanged vampire in popular culture. Christopher Frayling writes, "Dracula introduced fangs, red contact lenses, décolletage, ready-prepared wooden stakes and – in the celebrated credits sequence – blood being spattered from off-screen over the Count's coffin." Lee also introduced a dark, brooding sexuality to the character, with Tim Stanley stating, "Lee's sensuality was subversive in that it hinted that women might quite like having their neck chewed on by a stud."

Dracula has received critical acclaim. In 2013, Barry Norman included it among his choice of the 49 best British films. In 2017, a poll of 150 actors, directors, writers, producers, and critics for Time Out magazine saw Dracula ranked the 65th best British film ever. Empire magazine ranked Lee's portrayal as Count Dracula the 7th Greatest Horror Movie Character of All Time.

== Plot ==
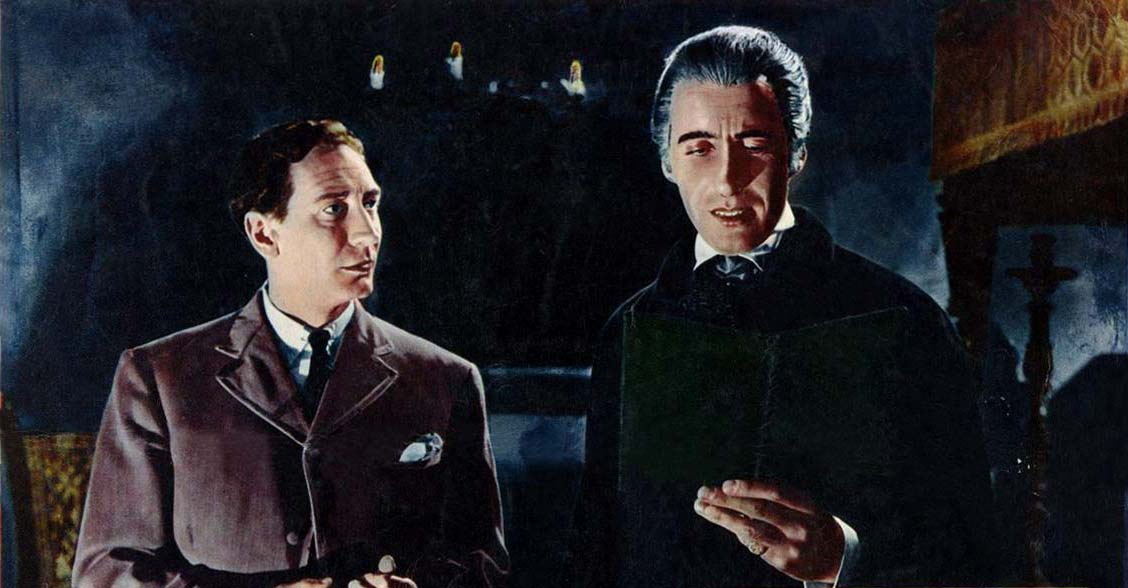
John Van Eyssen and Christopher Lee.

In 1885, librarian Jonathan Harker arrives at Count Dracula's castle near Klausenburg. Inside, he is startled by a young woman who begs for his help. Dracula arrives, greets Harker and accepts his credentials, and gives him a room. Alone, Jonathan writes in his diary, revealing that he is actually a vampire hunter and intends to destroy the Count, who is in truth a centuries-old vampire.

Harker attempts to rescue the unnamed woman but realizes too late that she is also a vampire and gets bitten. Dracula arrives and pulls her away as Harker passes out. Waking up, Harker discovers that an entire day has passed and finds bite marks on his neck. Knowing that he will soon turn, Harker writes a final entry in his journal and hides it. He descends into the castle's crypt to find Dracula and the vampire woman resting in their coffins. Harker quickly stakes the woman, watching as she withers away and dies. He then turns to Dracula's coffin and finds it empty. Dracula, awakened and angry, traps Harker inside the crypt.

Days pass, and Doctor Van Helsing arrives in Klausenburg, looking for his apprentice Harker. He attempts to recruit helpers at an inn but is rebuffed by the fearful locals. The innkeeper's daughter, however, gives him Harker's journal. He travels to Dracula's castle and finds it deserted but comes across the miniature portrait that Harker had of his fiancée Lucy Holmwood, with the photos now gone. Unearthing the crypt, he finds Harker but is horrified to see that his friend is now a vampire and sleeping in Dracula's coffin. Without hesitation, Van Helsing stakes him.

The doctor returns to Karlstadt, where he delivers the news of Harker's death to Arthur Holmwood and his wife Mina, brother and sister-in-law of Lucy, who is ill. Arthur is suspicious of Van Helsing and refuses to let him treat or even examine Lucy. When night falls, Lucy opens the doors to her terrace and lays bare her neck — already, it bears the mark of a vampire bite. Dracula then silently arrives and bites her again.

Mina seeks out Van Helsing's aid in treating Lucy, who begs the maid Gerda to remove his prescribed garlic bouquets and is found dead the next day. Van Helsing turns over Harker's journal to Arthur, who then comes to trust him. Three days after her burial, an undead Lucy lures Gerda's daughter Tania to a graveyard, where Arthur has found Lucy's tomb empty. Van Helsing appears and wards Lucy off with a cross. He explains to Arthur that Lucy was targeted to replace the woman Harker killed. Van Helsing suggests using her to lead them to Dracula, but Arthur refuses, and Van Helsing stakes his sister in her coffin. Arthur takes one final look at Lucy's body and sees her at peace.

Van Helsing and Arthur travel to the border crossing at Ingolstadt to track down Dracula's coffin. Meanwhile, Mina receives a message supposedly from Arthur, but which lures her into an ambush by Dracula. When Arthur returns, he sees that Mina can no longer hold a crucifix without burning her hand - proof that she is becoming a vampire. Arthur and Van Helsing watch the house all night to prevent Dracula from entering and attacking Mina again, but Dracula (having received Mina's permission to do so) slips inside discreetly and bites her again. Van Helsing gives her a blood transfusion from Arthur, but when he asks for a drink afterwards and Gerda explains that Mina forbade her to use the cellar, the two men find Dracula escaping with both his coffin and Mina.

A chase ensues as Dracula attempts to finish Mina's transformation before the sunrise. Van Helsing intervenes while Arthur digs up Mina from a shallow grave. Pursuing Dracula inside the castle, Van Helsing is unable to match the vampire's strength but is able to tear down a heavy curtain and force Dracula back with two candlesticks in the shape of a cross, causing him to crumble and die upon the touch of morning light. Mina recovers and the cross-shaped scar fades from her hand while Dracula's ashes blow away in the morning breeze, leaving only his clothes and ring behind.

== Cast ==
- Peter Cushing as Doctor Van Helsing
- Christopher Lee as Count Dracula
- Michael Gough as Arthur Holmwood
- Melissa Stribling as Mina Holmwood
- Carol Marsh as Lucy Holmwood
- John Van Eyssen as Jonathan Harker
- Valerie Gaunt as Vampire Woman
- Olga Dickie as Gerda
- Janina Faye as Tania
- Charles Lloyd-Pack as Doctor Seward
- George Merritt as Policeman
- George Woodbridge as Landlord
- George Benson as Frontier Official
- Miles Malleson as Undertaker
- Geoffrey Bayldon as Porter
- Barbara Archer as Inga
- Paul Cole as Lad

== Production ==
=== Concept ===
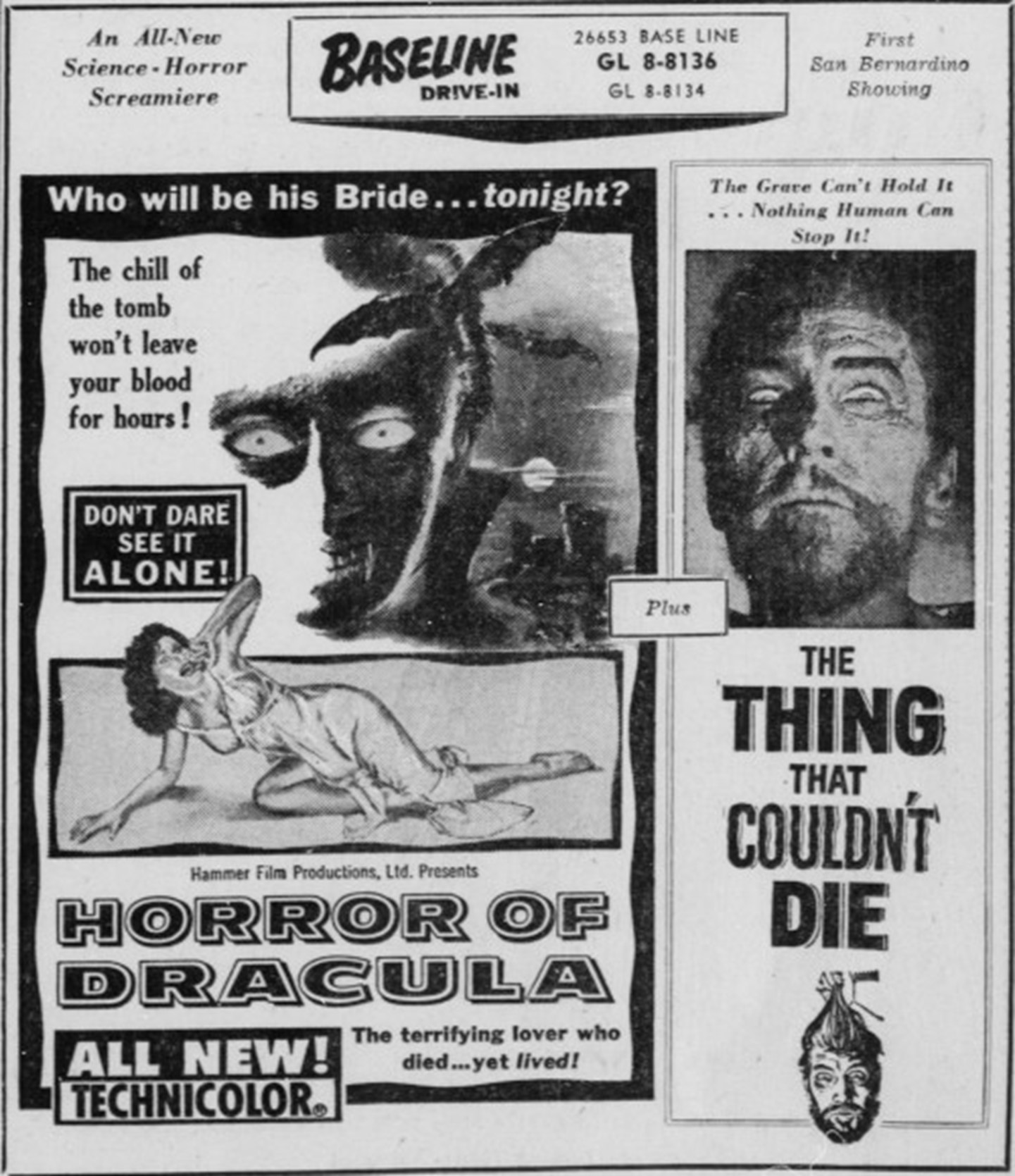
Drive-in advertisement from 1958 for Horror of Dracula and co-feature, The Thing That Couldn't Die.

As Christopher Lee remarked in an interview in Leonard Wolf's A Dream of Dracula: "I was always against the whole tie and tails rendition. Surely it is the height of the ridiculous for a vampire to step out of the shadows wearing white tie, tails, patent leather shoes and a full cloak". Lee said that he never watched any other performances of Dracula until well after making his films, and that when he got the first [Dracula] role with little time to prepare he "had to hurry off to read the book...[and] played it fresh, with no knowledge of previous performances."

In the same interview, Lee said the following about Dracula: "He had also to have an erotic element about him (and not because he sank his teeth into women)... It's a mysterious matter and has something to do with the physical appeal of the person who's draining your life. It's like being a sexual blood donor... Women are attracted to men for any of hundreds of reasons. One of them is a response to the demand to give oneself, and what greater evidence of giving is there than your blood flowing literally from your own bloodstream? It's the complete abandonment of a woman to the power of a man."

Lee believed he had discovered something in the character that hadn't been done before: "And also because I had read the book and I had perhaps discovered something in the character which other people hadn't or hadn't noticed or hadn't decided to present, and that is that the character is heroic, erotic and romantic." He also saw a certain tragedy in Dracula and tried to inject it into playing him: "I've always tried to put an element of sadness, which I've termed the loneliness of evil, into his character. Dracula doesn't want to live, but he's got to! He doesn't want to go on existing as the undead, but he has no choice."

Lee also felt that it was important to stay faithful to Stoker's novel and was frustrated with his Hammer Dracula films: "The stories as I've had them given to me have had almost no relation to the book...which is my reiterated complaint." "My one great regret has always been that I have never been able to present the Count exactly as Bram Stoker described him in every way. This was always due to poor scripts and a lack of imagination on the part of people who never seemed to understand the full potential of the story."

=== Writing ===
When Hammer asked for an adaptation of Stoker's novel, screenwriter Jimmy Sangster decided to streamline it to fit it into less than ninety minutes of screen time, and shooting on a low budget within the confines of Bray Studios and its surrounding estate. Working under these limitations, Sangster posited that Jonathan Harker travels to Dracula's castle intending to destroy Dracula (not to complete a real estate transaction, as in the novel) and gets killed, made Arthur Holmwood into Mina's husband and Lucy into Harker's fiancée and Arthur's sister. The characters Renfield and Quincey Morris were dropped completely. The subplot of the harrowing voyage of the ship that carries Dracula and his coffins to England was also abandoned and is replaced in the film by a short hearse ride because all of the action takes place in a relatively small area of Central Europe. The character of Van Helsing also differed from the figure in the original novel. Cushing explained the transformation: "The Curse of Frankenstein became this enormous success, and there I was when I was a younger man, and audiences got used to me looking like that. And I said, 'Now look here, what do we do with Van Helsing? I mean, do you cast a little old man with a beard who speaks Double Dutch or me? It's silly to make me up like that. Why don't you get someone who looks like him?' So we all decided, well, let's forget that and play him as I am, as I was then."

Dracula's ability to transform [into wolf, bat or mist] was dropped for the sake of realism - according to Sangster: "I thought that the idea of being able to change into a bat or a wolf or anything like that made the film seem more like a fairy tale than it needed to be. I tried to ground the script to some extent to reality."

Terence Fisher believed: "My greatest contribution to the Dracula myth was to bring out the underlying sexual element in the story. He [Dracula] is basically sexual. At the moment he bites it is the culmination of a sexual experience." According to Fisher, “Dracula preyed upon the sexual frustrations of his woman victims. The (Holmwood) marriage was one in which she [Mina] was not sexually satisfied and that was her weakness as far as Dracula’s approach to her was concerned.” In the scene where Mina returns after a night with Dracula, Fisher's directions to the actress were frank and unambiguous: "When she arrived back after having been away all night she said it all in one close-up at the door. She'd been done the whole night through, please! I remember Melissa [Stribling] saying 'Terry, how should I play the scene?' So I told her, 'Listen, you should imagine you have had one whale of a sexual night, the one of your whole sexual experience. Give me that in your face!'"

According to producer Anthony Hinds when it came to casting Dracula "it never occurred to any of us to use anyone else but Chris Lee". For his role in Horror of Dracula Lee earned £750. Speaking of filming and doing his take on the character, Lee recalled that he "tried to make the character all that he was in the book—heroic, romantic, erotic, fascinating, and dynamic."

=== Filming ===
Shooting began at Bray Studios on 11 November 1957. Principal photography came to an end on Christmas Eve 1957. Special effects work continued, with the film finally wrapping on 3 January 1958.

Syd Pearson handled Special Effects, and Roy Ashton and Phil Leakey did Makeup. Robert Lynn was assistant director and Bernard Robinson was Production Designer.

=== Music ===
James Bernard composed the film's score. Its principal three-note motif was constructed around the syllables of Dracula's name, giving the character a recurring musical signature. The British Film Institute has described Bernard's score as one of his finest and noted that his music became central to the characteristic sound of Hammer's horror productions.

== Release ==
The film received its world premiere in Milwaukee, Wisconsin in the United States on May 8, 1958. In the United States, the film was retitled Horror of Dracula to avoid confusion with the U.S. original by Universal Pictures, 1931's Dracula. It played as a double feature with the Universal-International film The Thing That Couldn't Die. The film opened at the Gaumont Haymarket in London on June 15, 1958.

=== Critical reception ===
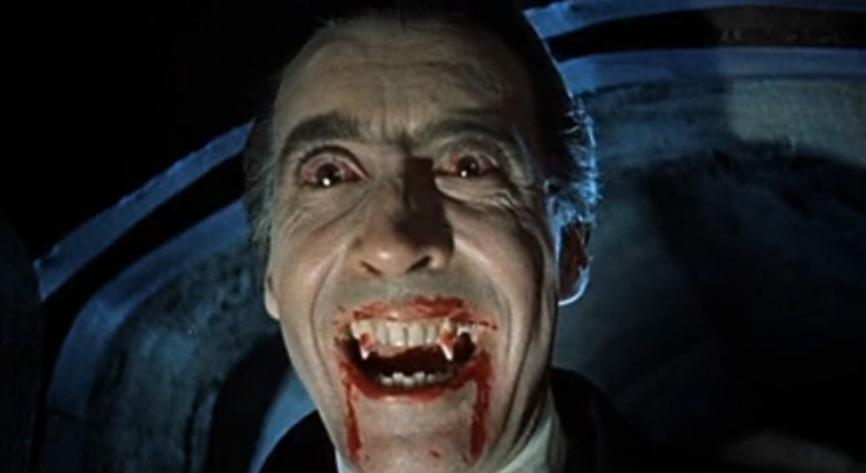
Christopher Lee as Dracula

Dracula was well received by critics and fans of Stoker's works. The trade journal reviews from 1958 were very positive. Film Bulletin noted, "As produced by Anthony Hinds in somber mid-Victorian backgrounds... and directed by Terence Fisher with an immense flair for the blood-curdling shot, this Technicolor nightmare should prove a real treat. The James Bernard score is monumentally sinister and the Jack Asher photography full of foreboding atmosphere." Variety called Peter Cushing's performance impressive and wrote that the "serious approach to the macabre theme...adds up to lotsa tension and suspense."

Harrison's Reports was particularly enthusiastic: "Of all the 'Dracula' horror pictures thus far produced, this one, made in Britain and photographed in Technicolor, tops them all. Its shock impact is, in fact, so great that it may well be considered as one of the best horror films ever made. What makes this picture superior is the expert treatment that takes full advantage of the story's shock values."

Vincent Canby in Motion Picture Daily said, "Hammer Films, the same British production unit which last year restored Mary Shelley's Frankenstein to its rightful place in the screen's chamber of horrors, has now even more successfully brought back the granddaddy of all vampires, Count Dracula. It's chillingly realistic in detail (and at times as gory as the law allows). The physical production is first rate, including the settings, costumes, Eastman Color photography and special effects."

The film holds an approval rating of 89% on Rotten Tomatoes based on 44 reviews, with an average rating of 7.7/10. The website's critical consensus states: "Trading gore for grandeur, Horror of Dracula marks an impressive turn for inveterate Christopher Lee as the titular vampire, and a typical Hammer mood that makes aristocracy quite sexy." Metacritic, which uses a weighted average, assigned the film a score of 67 out of 100, based on 9 critics, indicating "generally favorable" reviews.

=== Box office ===
The film earned around $3.5 million in theatrical rentals worldwide. It had a record ten-day run in Milwaukee in its premiere engagement. It was one of the twelve most popular films at the British box office in 1958. It earned rentals in North America of $1 million.

=== Home media ===
The film made its first appearance on DVD in 2002 in a U.S. stand-alone disc and was later re-released on 6 November 2007 in a film pack retitled as Horror of Dracula along with Dracula Has Risen from the Grave, Taste the Blood of Dracula, and Dracula A.D. 1972; which was part of Warner Bros. and New Line Cinema's "4 Film Favorites" line of DVDs. On 7 September 2010, Turner Classic Movies released the film in a four-pack along with Dracula Has Risen from the Grave, The Curse of Frankenstein and Frankenstein Must Be Destroyed. The film was released on DVD in the U.K. in October 2002 alongside The Curse of Frankenstein and The Mummy in a box-set entitled Hammer Horror Originals.

The film was digitally restored and re-released in the U.K. by the BFI in 2007. When the film was originally released in the U.K., the BBFC gave it an X rating, being cut, while the 2007 uncut re-release was given a 12A.

For many years, historians pointed to the fact that an even longer, more explicit, version of the film played in Japanese and European cinemas in 1958. Efforts to locate the legendary "Japanese version" of Dracula had been fruitless. In September 2011, Hammer announced that part of the Japanese release had been found by writer and cartoonist Simon Rowson in the National Film Center at the National Museum of Modern Art, Tokyo. The first five reels of the film held by the center were destroyed in a fire in 1984, but the last four reels were recovered. The recovered reels include the last 36 minutes of the film and includes two extended scenes, one of which is the discovery of a nearly-complete version of the film's iconic disintegration scene. Some experts rightly note that there is still footage missing from the disintegration scene, as evidenced by stills and the memories of those who had seen the sequence decades before. The announcement mentioned a HD telecine transfer of all four reels with a view for a future U.K. release.

On 29 December 2012, Hammer announced that the restored film would be released on a three-disc Blu-ray Disc set in the U.K. on 18 March 2013. This release contains the 2007 BFI restoration, along with the 2012 high-definition Hammer restoration, which includes footage which was previously believed to be lost. The set contains both Blu-ray Disc and DVD copies of the film, as well as several bonus documentaries covering the film's production, censorship and restoration processes.

The film was further digitally restored by the current domestic rights holder, Warner Bros. Pictures, in association with the BFI, for release in December 2018 on DVD and Blu-ray by the Warner Archive Collection. This version is different from 2002 and 2007 U.S. DVD releases, as the original Universal-International name and logo are restored and the opening credits bear the original Dracula title rather than Horror of Dracula. It also does not contain any of the additional footage that Hammer previously restored.

In Germany, Anolis Entertainment released a Blu-ray edition in December 2017 featuring an extended version based on Hammer's 2012 restoration, incorporating nearly three additional seconds of footage from a Japanese print.

In 2026, Hammer announced a new 4K restoration of the film, created with Silver Salt Restoration in partnership with Warner Bros. The restoration reinstates footage absent from the censored British and American theatrical versions, including material previously known from the original Japanese release, and was scheduled for a home-media release on 26 October 2026 presaged by a limited cinema re-release beginning on 19 October. A seven-disc limited collector's edition was also announced for 23 November 2026, featuring five versions of the film, approximately 15 hours of supplementary material, a 200-page book, a 60-page reprint of a House of Hammer comic, a double-sided poster and eight replica cinema lobby cards.

== Legacy ==
Dracula became a landmark in the development of British horror cinema and established the template for Hammer Film Productions' subsequent cycle of vampire films. The British Film Institute has described the film as having inaugurated Hammer's series of films centred on Count Dracula and credited its use of Technicolor, sexuality and graphic horror with distinguishing it from earlier screen adaptations of the character.

The film also established Christopher Lee as one of the defining screen interpretations of Dracula. The BFI has described the role as the performance that truly propelled Lee to stardom, while his romantic and sexually charged interpretation of the character subsequently became closely associated with his screen persona.

The pairing of Lee and Peter Cushing became strongly associated with Hammer horror. Cushing's more athletic interpretation of Van Helsing, including his physical confrontation with Dracula during the climax, was subsequently regarded as one of his signature roles.

== Sequels ==
After the success of Dracula, Hammer went on to produce eight sequels, six of which feature Lee reprising the titular role, and four of which feature Cushing reprising the role of Van Helsing.

- The Brides of Dracula (1960)
- Dracula: Prince of Darkness (1966)
- Dracula Has Risen from the Grave (1968)
- Taste the Blood of Dracula (1970)
- Scars of Dracula (1970)
- Dracula A.D. 1972 (1972)
- The Satanic Rites of Dracula (1973)
- The Legend of the 7 Golden Vampires (1974)

== Comic book adaptation ==
- The House of Hammer #1 (October 1976), adapted by Dez Skinn and Paul Neary.

== See also ==
- Dracula (Hammer film series)
- Hammer filmography
- The Curse of Frankenstein (1957), another Hammer film directed by Fisher and starring Cushing and Lee
- Gothic film, a style of cinema rooted in Gothic fiction
- The Mummy (1959 film), another Hammer film directed by Fisher and starring Cushing and Lee
- Vampire films
