= Dracula: Prince of Darkness =

1966 British film by Terence Fisher

- Theatrical release poster
- Directed by: Terence Fisher
- Screenplay by: John Sansom
- Story by: John Elder
- Based on: Count Dracula by Bram Stoker
- Produced by: Anthony Nelson Keys
- Starring: Christopher Lee; Barbara Shelley; Andrew Keir
- Cinematography: Michael Reed
- Edited by: Chris Barnes
- Music by: James Bernard
- Production company: Hammer Film Productions
- Distributed by: Warner-Pathé Distributors
- Release dates: 9 January 1966 (U.K.); 12 January 1966 (U.S.)
- Running time: 90 minutes
- Country: United Kingdom
- Language: English
- Budget: £100,000 (approx)
- Box office: $2.345 million (rentals)

Dracula: Prince of Darkness is a 1966 British gothic supernatural horror film directed by Terence Fisher. The film was produced by Hammer Film Productions, and is the third entry in Hammer's Dracula series, as well as the second to feature Christopher Lee as Count Dracula, the titular vampire. It also stars Andrew Keir, Francis Matthews, and Barbara Shelley.

The film was photographed in Techniscope by Michael Reed, designed by Bernard Robinson and scored by James Bernard.

== Plot ==
A prologue replays the final scenes from Dracula, in which Doctor Van Helsing destroys Count Dracula by sunlight; only the memory of Dracula's evil remains.

The main story begins in 1895 as Father Sandor prevents local authorities from disposing of a woman's corpse as if it were a vampire. Sandor chastises the presiding priest for perpetuating the fear of vampirism and reminds him that Dracula was destroyed ten years previously in 1885. Sandor visits an inn and warns four English tourists, the brothers Alan and Charles Kent, and their wives, Helen and Diana, not to visit Karlsbad. Ignoring his advice, the Kents choose to visit Karlsbad but are abandoned by their fear-stricken coach driver 2 km (1.2 mi) away from their destination as night approaches. Finding themselves in view of a castle, the Kents are taken there by a coachmanless carriage and discover a dining table set for four people and their bags unpacked in the bedrooms. A servant named Klove explains that his master, the late Count Dracula, had ordered that the castle should always be ready to welcome strangers. After dinner, the Kents settle in their rooms.

Later that night, Alan investigates a noise and follows Klove to the crypt, where Klove kills him and mixes his blood with Dracula's ashes, reviving the Count. Klove entices Helen to the crypt, where she becomes Dracula's first victim. The next morning, Charles and Diana can find no trace of Alan, Helen, or Klove. Charles takes Diana to a woodsman's hut and then returns to the castle to search for Alan and Helen. Klove tricks Diana into returning to the castle. Charles finds Alan's body in a trunk in the crypt. It is now dark and Dracula rises. Diana encounters Helen, who, now one of the undead, attacks her. Dracula enters and warns Helen away from Diana. Charles struggles with Dracula until Diana realizes that her crucifix is an effective weapon against vampires. Charles improvises a larger cross and drives Dracula away. They escape from the castle in a carriage but lose control on the rough ground as they go off the road. The carriage crashes and Diana is knocked unconscious. Charles carries her for several hours through the woods until they are rescued by Father Sandor, who takes them to his abbey.

Klove arrives at the abbey in a wagon carrying two coffins containing Dracula and Helen but is denied admission by the monks, by the order of Sandor, who knows that the vampires will try to gain entry. Ludwig, a patient at the abbey, is slave to Dracula and invites the Count inside. Helen convinces Diana to open the window and let her in, claiming to have escaped from Dracula. Diana does so and Helen bites her arm. Dracula drags Helen off, as he wants Diana for himself. Charles bursts into the room and drives the vampires out. Sandor sterilizes the bite with the heat from an oil lamp, then puts silver crucifixes in the two coffins to prevent the vampires from coming back. Sandor captures Helen and drives a stake through her heart, killing her. Ludwig lures Diana into Dracula's presence, where the Count hypnotizes her into removing her crucifix. Dracula coerces her to drink his blood from his bare chest, but Charles returns in time to prevent it, forcing Dracula to flee with the unconscious Diana.

Charles and Sandor arm themselves and follow on horseback. A shortcut allows them to get in front of Dracula's wagon and stop it. Charles shoots Klove, who has apparently removed Sandor's crucifixes from the coffins, but the horses gallop off to the castle. Diana is rescued while Dracula's coffin is thrown onto the ice that covers the moat. Charles attempts to stake Dracula, but the Count springs out of his coffin and attacks him. Sandor shoots the ice and it breaks. Diana rescues Charles, and Dracula sinks into the freezing waters and drowns.

== Cast ==
- Christopher Lee as Count Dracula
- Francis Matthews as Charles Kent
- Andrew Keir as Father Sandor
- Philip Latham as Klove
- Suzan Farmer as Diana Kent
- Barbara Shelley as Helen Kent
- Charles Tingwell as Alan Kent
- Thorley Walters as Ludwig
- Walter Brown as Brother Mark
- Jack Lambert as Brother Peter
- George Woodbridge as landlord
- Philip Ray as priest
- Joyce Hemson as mother
- John Maxim as coach driver
- Peter Cushing as Doctor Van Helsing (uncredited; archive footage only)

== Production ==
Dracula does not speak in the film, save for a few hisses. According to Christopher Lee: "I didn't speak in that picture. The reason was very simple. I read the script and saw the dialogue! I said to Hammer, 'If you think I'm going to say any of these lines, you're very much mistaken.'" Screenwriter Jimmy Sangster disputed that account in his memoir Inside Hammer, writing that "vampires don't chat. So I didn't write him any dialogue. Christopher Lee has claimed that he refused to speak the lines he was given...So you can take your pick as to why Christopher Lee didn't have any dialogue in the picture. Or you can take my word for it. I didn't write any."

The film was written into a novel by John Burke as part of his 1967 book The Second Hammer Horror Film Omnibus.

Filming took place at Bray Studios. The film was made back to back with Rasputin, the Mad Monk, using many of the same sets and cast, including Lee, Shelley, Matthews and Farmer. Shelley later remembered accidentally swallowing one of her fangs in one scene and having to drink salt water to bring it back up again because of the tight shooting schedule, as well as there being no spare set of fangs.

The film was released in some markets on a double feature with The Plague of the Zombies. Plastic vampire fangs and cardboard "zombie eyes" glasses were distributed to audience members as a gimmick.

== Reception ==
=== Box office ===
In North America, the film earned $364,937 in rentals. In France, the film drew 854,197 admissions.

The film was released with The Plague of the Zombies (1966). According to Fox records, the films needed to earn $1,500,000 in rentals to break even and made $2,345,000, meaning that it made a profit.

=== Critical ===
The Hammer Story: The Authorised History of Hammer Films called it "perhaps the quintessential Hammer horror", but said that it "contains little that audiences hadn't seen before." Variety wrote that the picture "should please the following of this type of film and do all right at the wickets. Terence Fisher has directed it with his usual know-how and the screenplay by John Samson is a workmanlike job which provides a useful number of mild thrills and little enough of the misplaced yocks that sometimes creep into this sort of pic."The Monthly Film Bulletin wrote: "Apart from one or two welcome innovations – notably the sort of Instant Vampire recipe by which Dracula is resuscitated, and his final destruction by drowning rather than by the usual procedures – this is the same old hash as before."

Dracula: Prince of Darkness currently holds an 85% approval rating on movie review aggregator website Rotten Tomatoes based on 20 reviews.

== Home media ==
The film was one of the first Hammer horror films to be released on United Kingdom DVD. More recently, on 19 January 2012, Hammer Films announced on their restoration blog that StudioCanal UK would release a Zone B Blu-ray Disc version of the film on 5 March of that year. The announcement stated it would be "the chilling DRACULA PRINCE OF DARKNESS, restored at Pinewood from 2-perf cut negative, scanned and restored in 2k. DRACULA PRINCE OF DARKNESS will be presented in all its Techniscope glory, in the original aspect ratio of 2.35:1." The Flicker Club in London screened the restored film on 24 February 2012 at a venue in the Old Vic Tunnels. The screening was preceded by a guest introduction by Marcus Hearn and a guest reading from Bram Stoker's original novel Dracula by actor Stephen Tompkinson.

In the U.S., Millennium Entertainment (now Alchemy) released the film as part of their Region 1 DVD Hammer Horror Collection in a two-disc, three-film set, along with The Legend of the 7 Golden Vampires and Frankenstein Created Woman. It is also available on a double feature Region 1 release along with The Satanic Rites of Dracula.

Scream Factory announced a Collector's Edition Blu-ray release of the film on 18 December 2018.

== In other media ==
Dracula: Prince of Darkness was adapted into a 15-page comics story by Donne Avenell and John Bolton, which was published in The House of Hammer #6 (June 1977) by General Books Distribution. (The same story was reprinted in Dracula Comics Special, published by Quality Communications in April 1984.)

The House of Hammer #6 adaptation of Dracula: Prince of Darkness included the character of Father Shandor (spelled "Sandor" in the film's credits), which then spawned an ongoing feature of Shandor as a demon-fighting priest, in that magazine. Father Shandor, Demon Stalker, written by Steve Moore, became a recurring feature in House of Hammer, appearing in issues #8, 16, 21, and 24. That feature moved over to the Quality Communications anthology comics title Warrior in 1982–1984, appearing in issues #1–10, 13, 16, 18–21, 23–25. (Warrior issues #1–3 reprint material from House of Hammer issues #8, 16, and 21.)

== See also ==
- Vampire films
- Dracula (Hammer film series)
- Hammer filmography
