= Dracula A.D. 1972 =

- Theatrical release poster
- Directed by: Alan Gibson
- Screenplay by: Don Houghton
- Based on: Count Dracula and Professor Van Helsing by Bram Stoker
- Produced by: Josephine Douglas
- Starring: Christopher Lee; Peter Cushing; Stephanie Beacham; Christopher Neame; Michael Coles
- Cinematography: Dick Bush
- Edited by: James Needs
- Music by: Mike Vickers
- Production company: Hammer Film Productions
- Distributed by: Columbia-Warner Distributors
- Release dates: 28 September 1972 (UK); 17 November 1972 (US)
- Running time: 96 minutes
- Country: United Kingdom
- Language: English
- Budget: £220,000

Dracula A.D. 1972 is a 1972 British horror film directed by Alan Gibson and produced by Hammer Film Productions. A reboot of the Hammer film series, it was written by Don Houghton and stars Christopher Lee, Peter Cushing and Stephanie Beacham.

Unlike earlier films in Hammer's Dracula series, Dracula A.D. 1972 has a contemporary setting in an attempt to update the Dracula story for modern audiences. Dracula is brought back to life in modern London and preys on a group of young partygoers that includes Jessica, the granddaughter of Lorrimer Van Helsing, himself a descendant of Dracula's nemesis, Lawrence Van Helsing.

Dracula A.D. 1972 is the seventh Hammer film featuring Dracula, and the sixth to star Lee in the title role. It also marked the return of Cushing as Van Helsing for the first time since The Brides of Dracula (1960), and was the first to feature both Lee and Cushing in their respective roles since Dracula (1958).

Dracula A.D. 1972 was followed by the last film in Hammer's Dracula series to star Lee, The Satanic Rites of Dracula (1973), which similarly utilised a modern setting and featured most of the same central characters.

== Plot ==
In 1872, Count Dracula and his nemesis Lawrence Van Helsing battle on the top of a runaway coach in Hyde Park, London. The carriage crashes, and Dracula is partly impaled by one of the wheels. In the struggle, Van Helsing manages to fully push the wheel into the vampire's chest, staking him. This done, Van Helsing collapses and dies from his own wounds. At that moment, a follower of Dracula arrives, collects Dracula's remains and, a few days later, buries them near Van Helsing's grave at St Bartolph's Church.

A century later, in 1972, Jessica Van Helsing, granddaughter of occult expert Lorrimer Van Helsing and descendant of Dracula's old nemesis, and Johnny Alucard, who closely resembles Dracula's disciple from 1872, are among a group of young hippies. Alucard persuades Jessica and the others to attend a Black Mass ceremony in the now abandoned, deconsecrated St Bartolph's, where he performs a bloody ritual involving one of their group, Laura Bellows. Jessica and the others flee in horror, after which Dracula is resurrected and kills Laura. Laura's body is discovered, drained of blood, and the Metropolitan Police starts a murder investigation, headed by Inspector Murray.

Murray suspects an occult element and interviews Lorrimer, who is shocked to learn the details of Laura's death. He realises that Alucard (whose name is Dracula written backwards) is a disciple of Dracula, and that the Count must have returned. Meanwhile, Alucard brings another of Jessica's friends, Gaynor Keating, to St. Bartolph's, where she is killed by Dracula and Alucard volunteers to become a vampire. The vampiric Alucard kills a passerby and lures Jessica's boyfriend, Bob Tarrant, to a café in Chelsea which they frequent, where he turns him into a vampire as well. While Lorrimer is out, Bob goes to the Van Helsing house and persuades Jessica to come to the café, where he and Alucard capture her and take her to Dracula.

Aided by Anna Bryant, one of Jessica's friends, Lorrimer tracks Alucard to his flat and battles him. Alucard accidentally kills himself with the running water in the bathroom shower. At St Bartolph's, Lorrimer finds Bob's dead body, slain by sunlight before he could reach his resting place, and Jessica in a trance, with Dracula planning to take his revenge on the Van Helsing family by turning her into a vampire. Lorrimer sets a trap for Dracula by placing a pit of stakes underneath the graveyard and waits for him to return at nightfall. The two have a struggle in which Lorrimer attempts to kill Dracula with a silver knife, but the knife is pulled out by Jessica, still under Dracula's command.

As the pair go outside, Lorrimer throws holy water at Dracula, which burns his hands and causes him to fall into the pit of stakes. Realising Dracula is still barely alive, Lorrimer uses a shovel to push Dracula into the stakes even further. Dracula dies, his body crumbling into ashes, and his spell over Jessica is broken. As Jessica embraces her grandfather, the title "Rest in Final Peace" is shown.

== Cast ==
- Christopher Lee as Count Dracula
- Peter Cushing as Lorrimer Van Helsing / Lawrence Van Helsing
- Stephanie Beacham as Jessica Van Helsing
- Christopher Neame as Johnny Alucard / Dracula's Servant
- Marsha Hunt as Gaynor Keating
- Caroline Munro as Laura Bellows
- Janet Key as Anna Bryant
- Michael Kitchen as Greg Puller
- Lally Bowers as Matron Party Hostess
- Stoneground as Themselves
- Michael Coles as Inspector Murray
- William Ellis as Joe Mitcham
- Philip Miller as Bob Tarrant
- David Andrews as Detective Sergeant
- Constance Luttrell as Mrs. Donnelly
- Michael Daly as Charles
- Artro Morris as Police Surgeon
- Jo Richardson as Crying Matron
- Brian John Smith as Hippy Boy
- Penny Brahms as Hippy Girl
- Flanagan as Go Go Dancer (uncredited)

== Production ==
Following the success of the modern-day vampire film Count Yorga, Vampire (1970), Warner Bros. commissioned two Hammer Dracula films set in the present day, which were to become Dracula A.D. 1972 and The Satanic Rites of Dracula (1973). The film was inspired by the events surrounding the Highgate Vampire case.

For the Black Mass segment, the film used the track "Black Mass: An Electric Storm in Hell" by the pioneering electronic group White Noise, from their 1969 album An Electric Storm; Christopher Neame's dialogue was later sampled by Orbital for the 1996 song "Satan Live" and the 2001 song "Tension" from their album The Altogether.

=== Filming ===
Dracula A.D. 1972 began production in September 1971 as Dracula Today and was filmed in Chelsea and Hertfordshire.

=== Soundtrack ===
The soundtrack was composed by former Manfred Mann member Mike Vickers, and is in a funky blaxploitation style that reflects the early 1970s setting of the film. It was first released commercially on 4 May 2009 by BSX Records (BSXCD 8855) on CD in a limited edition of 1,500 copies. The film also featured two songs, "Alligator Man" and "You Better Come Through for Me", by the American band Stoneground (a late replacement for Faces), which were included as bonus tracks on the CD.

=== Continuity ===
The film's opening sequence was not in the previous film, Scars of Dracula (1970), but is completely new and sets up a new short series of the Hammer Dracula chronology finishing in the following film, The Satanic Rites of Dracula (1973). This film's prologue takes place in 1872 and therefore is impossible to reconcile with the previous films in the series, the chronology of which starts in 1885 as described in the 1958 original.

== Release ==
Dracula A.D. 1972 was marketed with the taglines "Past, present or future, never count out the Count!" and "Welcome back, Drac!". When it was released in the United States, a brief clip was played before the film in which actor Barry Atwater (the vampire Janos Skorzeny in The Night Stalker) rises from a coffin and swears the entire audience in as members of the Count Dracula Society.

=== Reception ===
Critical reaction to Dracula A.D. 1972 has been mixed to negative. Upon the film's release, Roger Ebert gave the film only 1 star out of 4, while Clyde Jeavons of The Monthly Film Bulletin called it "an abortive and totally unimaginative attempt to update the Bram Stoker legend to present-day Chelsea", adding that the attempt to reconcile the setting with the Dracula myth "merely sends the script haywire ('Close the devil's circle—dig the music, kids!') ... even that old stand-by, unintentional humour, has been torpedoed by an arch script which insultingly begs for laughs with lines like, 'She's a bit drained,' and 'Come in for a bite.'"

Dennis Prince of DVD Verdict said, "Dracula A.D. 1972 is definitely one of the weakest installments in Hammer's horror catalog and will likely only have strong appeal to Dracula completists." Eccentric Cinema wrote, "One can have a fun time with this movie—mostly because of its faults. It's cheese all right, professionally made cheese that's much better acted and staged than it really has any right to be."

The Science Fiction, Horror and Fantasy Film Review called the film "a major disappointment" and "the low-point of the whole Hammer Dracula series" despite "minor positive aspects". George R. Reis of DVD Drive-In wrote, "Considered a low point in Hammer's roster, Dracula A.D. 1972 is hardly that. ... [T]he film has a number of things going for it. ... Cushing's exceptional Van Helsing pretty much carries the film. ... Christopher Neame is charismatically evil as Johnny Alucard [and] his stirring fight scene with Van Helsing is a highlight. ... How can Hammer fans not like this stuff?"

In his 2017 book on vampire films of the 1970s, author Gary A. Smith wrote that looking back on the film, "what seemed like a terrible idea back in 1972, really isn't so dire after all. Now, so far removed from its contemporary setting, the swinging London of Dracula A.D. 1972 seems as much a period piece as the Victorian settings of its predecessors. The main problem with the film is that Dracula is confined to the ruins of a Gothic church and never really interacts with the modern world."

Despite its generally mixed reception, the film has some prominent admirers and supporters. Following Lee's death in 2015, the American film director Tim Burton named it among his favourite films and considered giving the title of Beetlejuice 2024 A.D. to Beetlejuice Beetlejuice in tribute, while the English author, film critic, and horror expert Kim Newman chose it as one of his top 10 favourite vampire movies. In the 2020 BBC/Netflix Dracula miniseries, the third episode is in itself an homage to the film, taking place in present day. It also includes references to it along with many other Hammer Dracula films.

=== Home media ===
The film was released on DVD in 2005 by Warner Home Video in the United Kingdom, United States and Germany. It was released as Dracula A.D. 1972 in the UK and US and as Dracula jagt Mini-Mädchen in Germany. On 6 November 2007, the movie was released in a set along with Dracula, Dracula Has Risen from the Grave (1968) and Taste the Blood of Dracula (1970). The film was released on Blu-ray in 2018 by the Warner Archive Collection.

== See also ==
- Vampire film
- Dracula (Hammer film series)
- Hammer filmography
