= Anthony Hinds =

English screenwriter and producer 1922–2013

Anthony Frank Hinds
- Born: 19 September 1922; Ruislip, Middlesex, England
- Died: 30 September 2013 (aged 91); Chadlington, Oxfordshire, England
- Occupations: Screenwriter, film producer
- Years active: 1946–1984
- Spouse: Jean Knowles (m. 1956)
- Children: 2
- Father: William Hinds

Anthony Frank Hinds (19 September 1922 – 30 September 2013), also known as Tony Hinds and John Elder, was an English screenwriter and producer.

== Early life ==
The son of the founder of Hammer Film Productions, William Hinds, Anthony Hinds was born in Ruislip, Middlesex and educated at St Paul's School. He briefly joined his father's business before his war service as a pilot in the RAF during World War II.

== Career ==
In 1946 Hinds returned to Hammer and initially produced a great many modest thrillers. One of these was The Dark Road (1947), one of the quota quickies, which featured a jewellery shop called 'Hinds', a reference to his father's original business. This business had been divided in the 1920s between William and his brother Frank Hinds. Frank's part is now the F. Hinds national jewellery chain.

In the summer of 1953 Hinds was enthralled by the BBC's The Quatermass Experiment, a six-part science fiction thriller written by Nigel Kneale. Hinds was so impressed by what he saw that he suggested Hammer buy the big screen rights. They approached the BBC and snapped up the rights. After requesting the new 'X' certificate from the British Board of Film Censors, The Quatermass Xperiment (1955) was a box-office success and was the first of the three Quatermass cinema films based on the television serials.

Hinds came up with the idea of hiring country houses and shooting films in the rooms and grounds of the locations, which saved the cost of kitting out a full studio. The company acquired Down Place, renaming it Bray Studios, and was based there until 1966. Under the pseudonym John Elder he was a prolific screenwriter and from the mid-1960s he concentrated on this activity, though he produced the TV series Journey to the Unknown for LWT (1968–69) and The Lost Continent (1968) (the latter uncredited). His last screenwriting credit was 1984's The Masks of Death.

The horror script The Unquenchable Thirst of Dracula, which he wrote in the 1970s for Hammer, was never filmed. In October 2015 it was presented as a live stage reading by the Mayhem Film Festival at the Broadway Cinema in Nottingham, featuring the actor and film historian Jonathan Rigby as narrator. In October 2017 a studio production of the script was broadcast on BBC Radio 4, with narration by Michael Sheen.

== Personal life and death ==
In 1956, Hinds married Jean Knowles, and they had two daughters. He died from complications of Parkinson's disease at his home in Chadlington, Oxfordshire, on 30 September 2013.

== Selected filmography ==
Year	Title	Producer	Writer (as "John Elder")	Notes
1948	Who Killed Van Loon	Yes	No	
1949	Dick Barton Strikes Back	Yes	No	
1950	The Man in Black	Yes	No	
1950	Someone at the Door	Yes	No	
1950	Room to Let	Yes	No	
1950	What the Butler Saw	Yes	No	
1950	The Lady Craved Excitement	Yes	No	
1951	The Rossiter Case	Yes	No	
1951	To Have and to Hold	Yes	No	
1951	The Dark Light	Yes	No	
1951	A Case for PC 49	Yes	No	
1951	Black Widow	Yes	No	
1952	The Last Page aka Man Bait	Yes	No	
1952	Death of an Angel	Yes	No	
1952	Wings of Danger aka Dead On Course	Yes	No	
1952	Stolen Face	Yes	No	
1952	Lady in the Fog aka Scotland Yard Inspector	Yes	No	
1952	The Gambler and the Lady	Yes	No	
1953	The Flanagan Boy aka Bad Blonde	Yes	No	
1953	The Saint's Return aka The Saint's Girl Friday	Yes	No	
1953	36 Hours aka Terror Street	Yes	No	
1954	The House Across the Lake aka Heat Wave	Yes	No	
1954	Five Days aka Paid to Kill	Yes	No	
1955	The Glass Cage aka The Glass Tomb	Yes	No	
1955	The Quatermass Xperiment aka The Creeping Unknown	Yes	No	First horror film for Hammer Film Productions
1956	Women Without Men aka Blonde Bait	Yes	No	
1956	X the Unknown	Yes	No	
1957	The Curse of Frankenstein	Yes	No	
1956	Quatermass 2 aka Enemy From Space	Yes	No	
1957	The Camp on Blood Island	Yes	No	
1958	Dracula aka The Horror of Dracula	Yes	No	
1958	The Revenge of Frankenstein	Yes	No	
1959	The Hound of the Baskervilles	Yes	No	
1959	The Stranglers of Bombay	Yes	No	
1960	Never Take Sweets from a Stranger	Yes	No	
1961	The Curse of the Werewolf	Yes	Yes	Based on The Werewolf of Paris by Guy Endore
1962	The Phantom of the Opera	Yes	Yes	Based on The Phantom of the Opera by Gaston Leroux
1962	The Damned aka These Are The Damned	Yes	No	
1962	Captain Clegg aka Night Creatures	No	Yes	Loosely based on the character Doctor Syn created by Russell Thorndike
1963	Paranoiac	Yes	No	
1963	Maniac	Yes	No	
1963	Kiss of the Vampire	Yes	Yes	
1963	The Old Dark House	Yes	No	
1964	The Evil of Frankenstein	Yes	Yes	First writing credit in the Frankenstein series; based on characters created by Mary Shelley
1965	Fanatic aka Die! Die! My Darling!	Yes	No	
1965	Dracula: Prince of Darkness	No	Yes	First writing credit in the Dracula series; based on characters created by Bram Stoker
1966	The Reptile	No	Yes	
1966	Rasputin the Mad Monk	No	Yes	
1967	The Mummy's Shroud	No	Yes	Credits attribute screenplay to John Gilling "from an original story by John Elder." First credit in Hammer's Mummy series
1967	Frankenstein Created Woman	No	Yes	
1968	Dracula Has Risen from the Grave	No	Yes	
1968-1969	Journey to the Unknown	Yes	No	Television Anthology series
1970	Taste the Blood of Dracula	No	Yes	
1970	Scars of Dracula	No	Yes	
1970	Frankenstein and the Monster from Hell	No	Yes	
1975	Legend of the Werewolf	No	Yes	Uncredited remake of Hind's own The Curse of the Werewolf script from 1961; first screenplay not produced by Hammer Film Productions.
1975	The Ghoul	No	Yes	
1980	Visitor from the Grave	No	Yes	Episode of Hammer House of Horror; final produced screenplay
1984	Sherlock Holmes and The Masks of Death	No	Yes	TV movie, screenplay credited to N.J. Crisp, "story by John Elder." Based on characters created by Sir Arthur Conan-Doyle)
