= Scars of Dracula =

1970 British film by Roy Ward Baker

- Theatrical release poster
- Directed by: Roy Ward Baker
- Screenplay by: Anthony Hinds
- Based on: Count Dracula by Bram Stoker
- Produced by: Aida Young
- Starring: Christopher Lee; Dennis Waterman; Jenny Hanley; Christopher Matthews
- Cinematography: Moray Grant
- Edited by: James Needs
- Music by: James Bernard
- Production company: Hammer Film Productions
- Distributed by: MGM-EMI Distributors (UK)^{1} Continental Films (US)
- Release dates: 8 November 1970 (UK); 23 December 1970 (US)
- Running time: 95 minutes
- Country: United Kingdom
- Language: English
- Budget: £186,000-£200,000

Scars of Dracula is a 1970 British horror film directed by Roy Ward Baker for Hammer Films. It stars Christopher Lee as Count Dracula, along with Dennis Waterman, Jenny Hanley, Patrick Troughton and Michael Gwynn.

== Plot ==
Count Dracula's remains lie on a stone plinth in a chamber in his castle. The chamber can be accessed only through the window, set high in his castle wall. A large bat flies in and hovers over the plinth, regurgitating blood onto the Count's remains. The remains start to interact and bond with the dripped blood. Within seconds, Dracula is once more resurrected.

Local villagers are soon enraged that yet another young woman has been murdered by the Count. With a priest's blessing, they rise up and set fire to Dracula's castle. However, Dracula is safely asleep in his solid stone chamber. When the villagers return home, they find that every woman in the village has been slaughtered in the church by vampire bats.

Elsewhere, libertine Paul Carlson is falsely accused of rape and flees the Kleinenberg authorities by jumping into a coach which, though driverless, heads off at great speed. After breaking through the border guard, he is knocked off the coach, and stumbles into an inn, persuading the waitress Julie to let him in. The innkeeper interrupts them and throws Paul out. Walking in the forest, he finds the driverless coach, which the returning Klove, Dracula's servant, drives back to the castle. Initially Paul is welcomed by the Count and Tania, a woman who later reveals herself to be imprisoned by Dracula as his mistress. Paul has a liaison with Tania, who concludes their lovemaking by trying to bite his neck. Dracula appears and, casually throwing off Paul's efforts to stop him, stabs Tania through the heart with a dagger for betraying him. He then stoops over to drink the blood from the wounds of her dead body. Klove dismembers her body and dissolves it in a bath of acid. Locked in the room high in the castle, Paul uses tied-together bed curtains to climb down to a lower window, but the line is withdrawn by Klove and he finds himself in the Count's chamber.

Paul's more sober brother Simon, and Simon's fiancée Sarah Framsen, come searching for him. Julie the tavern directs them to the castle and they investigate. Dracula immediately has designs on Sarah, but Klove, who has fallen in love with the woman after seeing her photograph amongst Paul's possessions, helps the couple escape by refusing to do Dracula's bidding and remove Sarah's crucifix. As punishment, the servant is burnt by Dracula with a red-hot cutlass. Simon, having enlisted the help of the priest, goes back to the castle to look for Paul. However, the priest is attacked and killed by a vampire bat, and Simon is betrayed by Klove, ending up in the same doorless, inescapable room that Paul had been trapped in previously. Opening the coffin in the middle of the room, Simon discovers the sleeping Dracula, but the vampire's power reaches through his closed eyelids, causing the human to collapse before being able to take action against the Count.

When Simon recovers, the vampire has vanished. Investigating the room further, he is horrified to find Paul's drained corpse on a spike. Looking out of the window, Simon is amazed to see the Count running up the wall outside like an insect. With a rope let down by Klove, Simon climbs up the outer wall to go after Sarah, knowing that Dracula may use her as his new mistress. Sarah, meanwhile, has made her way back to the castle battlements as a storm approaches. She is confronted by Dracula, who this time uses his bat familiar to remove her crucifix. Just then, Klove arrives on the battlements and attacks the Count with the dagger that murdered Tania, but the servant is outmatched by Dracula's inhuman strength and is thrown over the side of the castle. Simon appears, removes a loose metal spike from the castle's battlements, and throws it at Dracula. The spike pierces the Count's lower torso, missing his heart. Unharmed, the Count raises the spike to impale Simon, but it is struck by lightning and Dracula is engulfed in flames. Staggering in agony, the Count collapses and topples over the castle's battlements, falling to the ground far below, where his corpse continues to burn.

== Cast ==
- Christopher Lee as Count Dracula
- Dennis Waterman as Simon Carlson
- Jenny Hanley as Sarah Framsen
- Christopher Matthews as Paul Carlson
- Patrick Troughton as Klove
- Anouska Hempel as Tania
- Michael Ripper as Landlord
- Michael Gwynn as The Priest
- Wendy Hamilton as Julie
- Delia Lindsay as Alice
- Bob Todd as Bürgermaster
- Toke Townley as Elderly Waggoner

== Production ==
=== Filming ===
Finance came from EMI Films. The film was shot on location in Hertfordshire and made at Elstree Studios, Borehamwood and Hertfordshire, England.

== Release ==
The film was released theatrically by EMI Films and American Continental Films Inc. in Great Britain and the United States respectively. The British film group EMI took over distribution of the film after Warner Bros. refused to finance/distribute it. It was also the first of several Hammer films to get an 'R' rating. It was released in some markets on a double feature with The Horror of Frankenstein.

=== Home media ===
The film was released on DVD by Anchor Bay Entertainment in 2004. This version is currently out of production. It has since been released as part of "The Ultimate Hammer Collection" DVD range. The disc also features a running commentary, with Christopher Lee and director Roy Ward Baker hosted by Marcus Hearn (co-author of The Hammer Story.)

In 2019, the film was re-released in the U.S. on Blu-ray by Scream Factory (a division of Shout Factory) with special features including one that discussed the making of the film. On November 24th 2025, StudioCanal released a restored 4k limited collectors edition in the UK.

=== Reception ===
Reviews from critics have been negative. Howard Thompson of The New York Times, reviewing the film along with the other half of the double bill, Horror of Frankenstein, stated that audiences should avoid Scars of Dracula "like the plague," calling it "garish, gory junk". Kevin Thomas of the Los Angeles Times wrote that the film "simply revs up one of the most familiar Dracula plots with sex and violence," adding, "Given something to work with, as in The Vampire Lovers, director Roy Ward Baker can turn out an excellent film. But really all he manages to do here is keep things moving." The Monthly Film Bulletin called it "one of the weaker films in the Hammer Dracula cycle," explaining that "most of the film is padded out with very dull and by now routine filler material, besides some rather unnecessary sadism. Even the normally powerful resurrection sequence is dealt with hastily before the credits, so there is far too little of Christopher Lee and far too much of the various young leads."

Author Lyndon W. Joslin, in his book Count Dracula Goes to the Movies reviewing the many film adaptations of Bram Stoker's Dracula, wrote: "The plummet in quality that had been threatening the Hammer Dracula series for years finally came to pass with Scars of Dracula, a garish live-action cartoon." John Kenneth Muir in Horror Films of the 1970s called the film "a by-the-numbers sequel that amply demonstrates why the studio's audience was shrinking as the 1960s became the 1970s."

The film restores a few elements of Bram Stoker's original character: the Count is introduced as an "icily charming host;" he has command over nature; and he is seen scaling the walls of his castle. It also gives Lee more to do and say than any other Hammer Dracula film except his first, 1958's Dracula.

== See also ==
- Vampire film
- Dracula (Hammer film series)
- Hammer filmography

== Notes ==
1. In 1986, Turner purchased pre-May 1986 MGM films, including Scars of Dracula for UK release, now owned by Warner Bros. through Turner Entertainment only in UK.
