= Roy Ward Baker =

English film director (1916–2010)

- Baker in 1961
- Born: Roy Horace Baker; 19 December 1916; London, England
- Died: 5 October 2010 (aged 93); London, England
- Other name: Roy Baker
- Occupation: Film director
- Years active: 1947–1992
- Spouses: Muriel Bradford (m. 1940; div. 1944) Joan Dixon (m. 1948; div. 1984)
- Children: 1

Roy Ward Baker (born Roy Horace Baker; 19 December 1916 – 5 October 2010) was an English film director.

He was known professionally as Roy Baker until 1967, when he adopted Roy Ward Baker as his screen credit.

== Early life ==
Baker was born in Hornsey, London, where his father was a Billingsgate wholesale fish merchant. He was educated at a Lycée in Rouen, France, and at the City of London School.

== Career ==
Baker's first job, in 1933 aged 17, was in the mail room at the Columbia Gramophone Company. From 1934 to 1939, he worked for Gainsborough Pictures, a British film production company based in Islington, London. His first jobs were menial, and he progressed rapidly to location scouting and second-unit directing. In 1938 he was appointed assistant director on Alfred Hitchcock's The Lady Vanishes (1938).

He served in the Army during the Second World War, joining the Army Kinematograph Service in 1943 as a production manager and director of documentaries. One of his superiors was novelist Eric Ambler, who gave Baker his first big break directing The October Man (1947), from an Ambler screenplay.

His next two films, The Weaker Sex (1948) and Paper Orchid (1949), were popular but overshadowed by the success of Morning Departure (1950).

=== Hollywood ===
The latter drew international attention to Baker and Darryl F. Zanuck, production head of 20th Century Fox, invited him to Hollywood, although his first film for Fox – I'll Never Forget You (1951) – was made in the UK. Baker worked for three years at Fox where he directed Marilyn Monroe in Don't Bother to Knock (1952) and Robert Ryan in the 3D film noir Inferno (1953). He returned to the UK in 1953 and continued to work in films.

=== Britain ===
Baker returned to Britain and worked for the Rank Organisation. He had a big hit with The One That Got Away.

Towards the end of the decade, he directed one of his best known films: A Night to Remember, a reconstitution of the Titanic tragedy.

Baker worked for television during the 1960s and early 1970s, directing shows including The Avengers, The Saint, The Persuaders!, The Human Jungle, The Champions, and Randall and Hopkirk (Deceased). He continued to work in films, directing, among others, Quatermass and the Pit (1967), The Vampire Lovers (1970) and Scars of Dracula (1970) for Hammer, and Asylum (1972) and The Vault of Horror (1973) for Amicus. He also directed Bette Davis in the black comedy The Anniversary (1968), and co-directed (with Hong Kong director Chang Cheh) the Hammer-Shaw Brothers Studio collaboration The Legend of the 7 Golden Vampires (1974).

In the latter part of the 1970s he returned to television, and throughout the 1980s continued to work on shows including The Irish R.M. and Minder. He retired in 1992.

In 2000, Baker published his memoirs, The Director's Cut: A Memoir of 60 Years in Film and Television, and in 2002 sold his production files and letters at auction.

He contributed interviews to several DVD extras, such as those included with The Saint and Randall & Hopkirk (Deceased), and took part in the BBC2 Two series British Film Forever (2007) and in Mark Gatiss's BBC Four series, A History of Horror (2010), in which he gave his final recorded interview.

== Change of name ==
In the early 1960s, Baker became aware of name confusion with another Roy Baker in the industry, a dubbing editor. After nothing came of his suggestion that the editor change his name, in 1967 Baker changed his own screen credit, adopting his mother's maiden name "Ward".

== Personal life and death ==
Baker was married to Muriel Bradford from 1940 to 1944. In 1948, he married Joan Dixon, with whom he had a son. They divorced in 1984.

Baker died on 5 October 2010, aged 93.

== Awards ==
Baker directed A Night to Remember (1958) which won a Golden Globe for Best English-Language Foreign Film in 1959.

== Filmography (as director) ==
Films credited to Roy Baker are marked *. Films made by the Army Kinematograph Service are marked AKS.

- According to our Records (Short, AKS) (1943) *
- Home Guard Town Fighting Series (Shorts, AKS) (1943) *
- Technique of Instruction in the Army (Shorts, AKS) (1944) *
- What's the Next Job? (Short) (1944, AKS) *
- Warner's Warnings (Short) (1945, AKS) *
- A Letter from Home (Short) (1945, AKS) *
- Read All About It (Short) (1945, AKS) *
- Think It Over (Short) (1945, AKS) *
- The October Man (1947) *
- The Weaker Sex (1948) *
- Paper Orchid (1949) *
- Morning Departure a.k.a. Operation Disaster (1950) *
- Highly Dangerous (1950) *
- I'll Never Forget You (1951) *
- Don't Bother to Knock (1952) *
- Night Without Sleep (1952) *
- Inferno (1953) *
- Passage Home (1955) *
- Jacqueline (1956) *
- Tiger in the Smoke (1956) *
- The One That Got Away (1957) *
- A Night to Remember (1958) *
- The Singer Not the Song (1961) *
- Flame in the Streets (1961) *
- The Valiant (1962) *
- Two Left Feet (1963) *
- Quatermass and the Pit (1967)
- The Anniversary (1968)
- The Fiction Makers (1968)*
- Moon Zero Two (1969)
- The Vampire Lovers (1970)
- Scars of Dracula (1970)
- Journey to Midnight (1971)
- Dr. Jekyll and Sister Hyde (1971)
- Asylum (1972)
- The Vault of Horror (1973)
- And Now the Screaming Starts! (1973)
- Mission Monte Carlo (1974)
- The Legend of the 7 Golden Vampires (1974) (co-director)
- The Switch (1976)
- Death Becomes Me (1979)
- The Monster Club (1981)

== Television (as director) ==
Productions credited to Roy Baker are marked *

- Zero One (2 episodes) (1962–1963) *
- The Saint (18 episodes) (1963–1968) *
- Gideon's Way a.k.a. Gideon C.I.D. (3 episodes) (1964–1965) *
- The Human Jungle (8 episodes) (1964) *
- The Avengers (8 episodes) (1965–1968) *
- The Baron (4 episodes) (1966–1967) *
- Journey to the Unknown (1 episode) (1968)
- Department S (1 episode) (1969)
- The Champions (2 episodes) (1969)
- Randall and Hopkirk (Deceased) a.k.a. My Partner the Ghost (2 episodes) (1969)
- The Spy Killer (1969) *
- Foreign Exchange (1970) *
- The Persuaders! (4 episodes) (1971–1972)
- Jason King (4 episodes) (1971–1972)
- The Protectors (1 episode) (1973)
- Return of the Saint (2 episodes) (1978)
- Sherlock Holmes and Doctor Watson (5 episodes) (1979–1980)
- Minder (13 episodes) (1979–1989)
- Danger UXB (3 episodes) (1979)
- The Flame Trees of Thika (7 episodes) (1981)
- Q.E.D. (1 episode) (1982)
- The Masks of Death a.k.a. Sherlock Holmes and the Masks of Death (1984)
- The Irish R.M. (13 episodes) (1984–1985)
- Fairly Secret Army (7 episodes) (1986)
- Saracen (1 episode) (1989)
- The Good Guys (3 episodes) (1992)
