= The Legend of the 7 Golden Vampires =

1974 British-Hong Kong film by Roy Ward Baker

- British film poster

Chinese name
- Traditional Chinese: 七金屍
- Simplified Chinese: 七金尸
Transcriptions
Standard Mandarin
- Hanyu Pinyin: Qī jīn shī
Yue: Cantonese
- Jyutping: Chat1 gam1 si1
- Directed by: Roy Ward Baker; Chang Cheh
- Screenplay by: Don Houghton
- Based on: Count Dracula and Professor Van Helsing by Bram Stoker
- Produced by: Don Houghton; Vee King Shaw
- Starring: Peter Cushing; Julie Ege; David Chiang; Robin Stewart; Shih Szu
- Cinematography: John Wilcox; Roy Ford
- Edited by: Chris Barnes
- Music by: James Bernard
- Production companies: Hammer Film Productions; Shaw Brothers Studio
- Distributed by: Columbia-Warner Distributors (United Kingdom)
- Release dates: 11 July 1974 (Hong Kong); 6 October 1974 (UK); 15 June 1979 (US)
- Running time: 89 minutes (UK); 75 minutes (US)
- Countries: United Kingdom; Hong Kong

The Legend of the 7 Golden Vampires (Chinese: 七金屍) is a 1974 martial arts horror film directed by Roy Ward Baker. The film opens in 1804, when seven vampires clad in gold masks are resurrected by Count Dracula (played by John Forbes-Robertson). A century later, Professor Abraham Van Helsing (Peter Cushing), world-renowned for his exploits with Dracula, is recruited by Hsi Ching (David Chiang) and his seven siblings after giving a lecture at a Chinese university to take on the vampires. The film is a British-Hong Kong co-production between Hammer Film Productions and Shaw Brothers Studio.

The Legend of the 7 Golden Vampires was shot between 22 October and 11 December 1973, at Shaw Brothers Studios in Hong Kong, where Chang Cheh was hired to direct further martial arts scenes for the film's release in the East. The film was first released in Hong Kong and then in the United Kingdom with a shorter runtime. On its release in the United States, the film was truncated further and titled The 7 Brothers Meet Dracula. The film was a financial failure.

Baker said that The Legend of the 7 Golden Vampires was a "Terrible picture, but some of the Chinese were very nice. The leading man was David Chang, a nice man. The kung-fu people were alright. They went a bit berserk but I left that alone. The understanding was that they would do the kung-fu stuff and I would do the rest of it, which suited me no end I can tell you."

== Plot ==
In 1804 Transylvania, Taoist monk Kah, the high priest of the Temple of the Seven Golden Vampires in rural China, travels through the countryside to Castle Dracula. There, Kah summons Count Dracula. The Seven Golden Vampires' power is fading and Kah needs Dracula to restore them to their former glory. Dracula decides to help on one condition: that he uses Kah's body to escape the castle, which has become his prison. Despite Kah's pleas for mercy, Dracula displaces himself into Kah's body and leaves the tomb for China.

A century later, Professor Abraham Van Helsing gives a lecture at a Chungking university on Chinese vampire legends. He mentions an unknown rural village that has been terrorised by a cult of seven known as the Seven Golden Vampires. A farmer named Hsi Tien-en trekked to their temple and battled them. Tsien-en was unsuccessful, and his wife died in the fight, but he managed to grab a medallion from a vampire's neck, which he saw as the creatures' life source. Tsien-en then fled, but Kah sent the vampires and their turned victims after him. About to be cornered, Tsien-en placed the medallion around a small jade Buddha statue before the vampires killed him. A vampire spied the medallion around the Buddha and went over to collect it. However, after touching the Buddha, the vampire burst into flames.

Van Helsing thinks that the village still exists and is terrorized by the six remaining vampires; he is only unsure of where it lies. Most of the professors he has gathered disbelieve the story and leave, but one young man, Hsi Ching, informs Van Helsing that the farmer from the story was his grandfather. Hsi Ching produces the medallion and asks Van Helsing if he would be willing to travel to the village and destroy the vampires. Van Helsing agrees and embarks with his son Leyland, Hsi Ching, and his seven kung fu-trained siblings on a journey funded by Vanessa Buren, a wealthy widow whom Leyland and two of Ching's siblings, Kwei and Ta, saved from an attack by the tongs.

En route, the group are ambushed by three of the six vampires in a cave, along with their army of undead. The group are engaged in battle and eventually destroy three vampires and the undead retreat. The following morning, the party reaches the village, partly ruined but still populated, and prepares to make their final stand. They use wooden stakes as barriers and dig a trench around them filled with flammable liquid. In the temple that evening, Dracula, still disguised as Kah, calls on the remaining vampires to kill Van Helsing and his party. The vampires reach the village, and Van Helsing's group once again battle with the last of the golden vampires and their army, resulting in a fight that kills two vampires, many undead servants, various villagers, and several of Van Helsing's companions. During the fight, Vanessa is bitten by a vampire and becomes one herself. She bites Ching, who throws himself and Vanessa onto a wooden stake, impaling them both.

During the battle, the last remaining vampire takes Ching's sister Mai Kwei to the temple to drain her of her blood. Leyland steals a horse from a dead vampire and pursues. The army of undead defeated, Van Helsing and Mei's remaining brothers follow to help Leyland at the temple. There, the vampire straps Mai Kwei to an altar. It is about to drain her blood when Leyland intervenes. Before Leyland can be drained, Van Helsing's party bursts in, and he destroys the last vampire. All of the survivors leave the temple, save for Van Helsing, who feels a familiar presence and comes to face Dracula in Kah's body. Discovered, Dracula reveals his true form and attacks Van Helsing. In the ensuing struggle, Van Helsing stabs Dracula through the heart with a silver spear, causing the Count to turn to dust.

== Cast ==
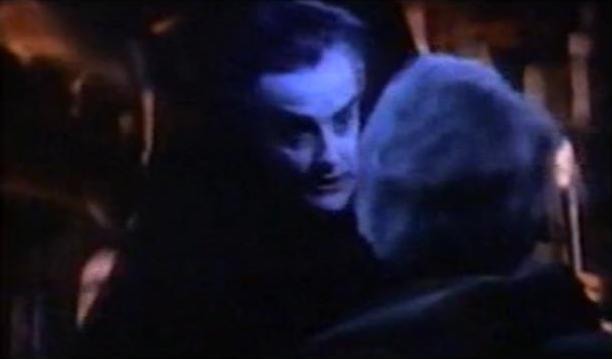
John Forbes-Robertson as Dracula in the film

- Peter Cushing as Professor Abraham Van Helsing
- John Forbes-Robertson as Count Dracula
  - David de Keyser as Count Dracula (uncredited voice)
- Robin Stewart as Leyland Van Helsing
- Julie Ege as Vanessa Buren
- Robert Hanna as British Consul
- David Chiang as Hsi Ching/Hsi Tien-en
- Shih Szu as Hsi Mai Kwei
- Chan Shen as Kah
- James Ma as Hsi Ta
- Liu Chia Yung as Hsi Kwei
- Fung Hak-on as Hsi Sung
- Chen Tien-loong as Hsi San
- Huang Pei-Chi as Hsi Po-Kwei
- Hui-Ling Liu as Hsi Hong
- Feng Ko-An as Assassin
- Hsu Hsia as Assassin

== Production ==
The Legend of the 7 Golden Vampires began development due to Don Houghton's wife Pik-Sen Lim's father knowing Hong Kong film producer Run Run Shaw. Houghton flew to Hong Kong to discuss a project with Run Run Shaw and his brother Runme Shaw who agreed to finance 50% of the film.

=== Filming ===
The Legend of the 7 Golden Vampires was filmed between 22 October and 11 December 1973, at Shaw Brothers Studio in Hong Kong, with mountain scenes shot on Kowloon Peak. The Shaw Brothers were not happy with how Roy Ward Baker was directing the film and had martial arts sequences choreographed by one of their studios directors, leading to a second unit set up that was handled by Chang Cheh. Chang added scenes that led to the Eastern version of the film to run at 110 minutes. Renee Glynee, the continuity supervisor for the film, stated that working with the Shaw Brothers Studios was "a big experience" due to language differences and that Baker was screaming at the Chinese actors to stop spitting on set.

== Release ==
The Legend of the 7 Golden Vampires was first released in Hong Kong on 11 July 1974. The film received its premiere in London on 29 August 1974, at the Warner Rendezvous Theatre and had general release in the United Kingdom on 6 October 1974, by Columbia/Warner Distributors. The American version cuts out 20 minutes of the film's footage and soundtrack and loops several remaining scenes to fill the running time.

For the film's release in the United States, it received a sneak peek screening in November 1975 at the Famous Monsters of Filmland Convention in New York City which included attendance by Michael Carreras and Peter Cushing. It received wider distribution in the United States in June 1979 by Dynamite Entertainment with a 75-minute running time and re-titled to The 7 Brothers Meet Dracula. Under the guidance of Michael Carreras, an original edit of the film eliminated Dracula (John Forbes-Robertson), but Carreras stated that the film was too short so Dracula's character was re-instated. In the film Dracula has the ability to assume another person's appearance, an ability that was removed from Houghton's script for The Satanic Rites of Dracula, and re-used in this film.

The film was not a box office success. There was a planned sequel to be titled Kali, Devil Bride of Dracula, which was to be filmed in India, but it was never made.

=== Home media ===
The Legend of the 7 Golden Vampires was released on VHS by 1991. It was released on DVD in the United Kingdom by Warner Bros. Home Entertainment. In 1998, The Roan Group released a LaserDisc edition of the film in the United States, which includes both the original unedited The Legend of the 7 Golden Vampires version and the later The 7 Brothers Meet Dracula version. Anchor Bay Entertainment issued a DVD release of the film in the US, again featuring both cuts of the film. The US DVD also features a recording of Peter Cushing telling the story of the film with music and sound effects, which was released as an LP record at the time of the film's release.

In April 2019, a 2K restoration of the film was released on Blu-ray by Scream Factory. In September 2023, Signal One Entertainment released the film on Blu-ray in the UK.

== Reception ==
In contemporary reviews, the Times found that the film "would be tedious if it were not for the distinguished presence of Peter Cushing as a Dracula-hunter and for some advanced exercises in the practice of vampire disintegration". Cinema TV Today found that "it is a pity that this blend of two popular genres could not have been more carefully thought out." Verina Glaessner wrote in the Monthly Film Bulletin that the film was a "fascinating failure" noting that "part of the film's failure is due to an equivocal attitude towards its subject, and part of a misunderstanding of the role that hand-to-hand combat plays in Chinese films."

From retrospective reviews, Keith Phipps of The A.V. Club called the film "flawed" but "enjoyable", adding, "It's pretty much as ridiculous as it sounds, but there's something inherently entertaining about make-up-splattered vampires, distinguished British actors, and martial artists squaring off in periodic eruptions of kung-fu fighting." Phil Chandler of DVD Cult wrote, "Is it the best Hammer horror film ever made? Hell no. Is it the best Hammer film of the seventies? Hell yeah." Graeme Clark of The Spinning Image said, "Cushing, in his last Hammer Dracula film, is as commanding as ever, but he and his Western companions are pretty disposable to the plot until the end, where the professor is left alone with the Count, who is hardly needed. Nevertheless, this last Hammer vampire outing has a real energy, in spite of being a mishmash, and is different enough to get by on sheer novelty alone." Writing in The Zombie Movie Encyclopedia, academic Peter Dendle called the raising of the undead army "one of the most visually spectacular in zombie cinema". Glenn Kay, who wrote Zombie Movies: The Ultimate Guide, called the film "boisterous, action-packed, and very likeable".

Roy Ward Baker later spoke about the film, declaring that "the whole set-up was slip-shod, and nobody knew what anyone was doing." and that the film was "a failure, an absolute failure". Michael Carreras later said this "wasn't such a good idea" although he felt "some of the film is quite good."

== In other media ==
The Legend of the 7 Golden Vampires was adapted into a 15-page comics story by Steve Moore and Brian Lewis, and published in The House of Hammer #4 (February 1977) by General Books Distribution. The same story was later reprinted in issue #24 (1982) of the same publication.

Peter Cushing narrated the audio LP version of the movie which was released in 1974.

== See also ==
- Vampire films
- Dracula (Hammer film series)
- Hammer filmography
