= Bill Lenny =

British film editor

- Born: 5 January 1924; London, United Kingdom
- Died: 7 January 2002 (aged 78); Reading, United Kingdom
- Occupation: Film editor

Bill Lenny (5 January 1924 – 7 January 2002) was a British film editor. Among his films were Cromwell (1970), Casino Royale (1967) and Hammer Film's original Dracula (1958). He was nominated for an Emmy and Eddie award for work on Ike (1979), and for a second Eddie for Life on the Mississippi (1980).
