= Delia Lindsay =

Sudanese English actress

Delia Lindsay (born 19 September 1945) is an English film, stage, and television actress. She is known for her appearances in film adaptations such as Scars of Dracula (1970) and An Ideal Husband (1999), as well as her extensive stage work, including the original Broadway production of Alan Ayckbourn's Bedroom Farce.

== Background and personal life ==
Lindsay was born in Sudan to a British expatriate family. She trained in acting in England during the 1960s, beginning her career in regional repertory theatre.

Lindsay was married to actor Jeremy Sinden (son of Donald Sinden) from 1978 until his death from lung cancer in 1996. The couple had two daughters, Kezia and Harriet.

== Career ==
Lindsay made her West End debut in 1968 in the original London production of the musical Canterbury Tales. In 1979, she made her Broadway debut at the Brooks Atkinson Theatre, originating the role of Susannah in the American production of Alan Ayckbourn's comedy Bedroom Farce. Her subsequent theatre work includes the West End musical Are You Lonesome Tonight? (1985) and a 1998 production of Gentlemen Prefer Blondes at Regent's Park Open Air Theatre.

On television, Lindsay appeared in several prominent British series throughout the 1970s and 1980s, including Upstairs, Downstairs, A Fine Romance, and Fresh Fields. In 1999, she guest-starred in the Midsomer Murders episode "Dead Man's Eleven", and later appeared in the BBC miniseries adaptation of Daniel Deronda (2002).

== Filmography ==
- Scars of Dracula (1970) as Alice
- Tam Lin (1970) as Second Coven Member
- Because of the Cats (1973) as Mrs. Jansen
- The Mystery of Edwin Drood (1993) as Mrs. Crisparkle
- Mrs Brown (1997) as Lady Ely
- Hilary and Jackie (1998) as Margaret
- An Ideal Husband (1999) as Lady Basildon
- Daniel Deronda (2002, TV miniseries) as Mrs. Arrowpoint
- Piccadilly Jim (2004) as Mrs. Pett
