= Josephine Douglas =

British actress and TV and film producer (1926–1988)

Josephine Douglas on the cover of TV Mirror in 1958

Josephine Douglas (6 October 1926 – 12 July 1988) was a British actress and TV and film producer. Her original name was Jo Doll (née Rickett). She played a pioneering role as a woman in television production at a time when it was dominated by men. She was the co-producer and co-host of Britain's first pop chart television show, Six-Five Special, during 1957–58. The show broke the mould of British TV and ushered in an era in which popular culture seemed to be dominated by the young.

== Life ==
She was born at 146 The Green, Earlsheaton, Huddersfield, West Riding of Yorkshire, England, the daughter of Jessie Elizabeth (born Hampson) and Bernard Rickett, a manager for Fyffes banana company.

She showed an early interest in drama. As a teenager she produced a fundraising performance of Hansel and Gretel to raise funds for the air force in the Second World War. It led to parts in the amateur dramatic group the Huddersfield Thespians, with whom she made her stage début in December 1943, in J. B. Priestley's play Time and the Conways.

She joined the Women's Auxiliary Air Force (WAAF) as a wireless mechanic in 1944, During her service she appeared in and staged camp shows which led to a wartime grant to attend the Royal Academy of Dramatic Art (RADA) in 1947, She was spotted there by Alfred Hitchcock who gave he a minor role in his next film, Stage Fright (1950).

She began her acting career by appearing in minor roles in the West End and in several British films during the 1950s including the 1953 film Will Any Gentleman in which she joined the actors George Cole and Sidney James. She was also a panelist on TV panel game shows such as Find the Link, and The Name's the Same.

Her first TV role as a presenter was on the BBC's In Town Tonight in 1953.

In October 1955 she was awarded a two-year contract by the BBC. At the time she was the only woman producer of light entertainment in Europe. She went on to become the co-producer and co host of Six-Five Special, the BBC's first attempt to attract a teenage audience, which began its run on 16 February 1957.

She appeared in the BBC television play Left, Right and Centre, but then crossed over to ITV to work on news programmes. ITV was seen as the opposition by BBC managers at that time and her move annoyed the BBC hierarchy. She returned to drama to produce the long-running ITV soap Emergency Ward 10 and successfully increased its viewership by bringing in better known actors.

Her other works as producer include Our Miss Fred (1972), Dracula AD 1972 (1972) and Virgin of the Secret Service (1968).

Jo Douglas continued to produce TV and film into the 1980s but died from cancer on 12 July 1988 at her home, White Briars, Slinfold, Sussex at the age of 61.
