= Valerie Gaunt =

British actress (1932–2016)

- Filming Dracula, in 1958
- Born: Valerie Sheila Gaunt; 26 June 1932; Stratford-on-Avon, Warwickshire, England
- Died: 27 November 2016 (aged 84); Isle of Wight, England
- Education: Royal Academy of Dramatic Art
- Occupation: Actress
- Years active: 1956-1958
- Spouse: Rev Gerald Alfred Reddington (m. 1958)
- Children: 4

Valerie Sheila Gaunt (26 June 1932 – 27 November 2016) was a British actress.

She graduated from RADA in 1951, and appeared subsequently in repertory theatre.

Valerie Gaunt was best known for her appearances in the 1957 and 1958 Hammer horror films The Curse of Frankenstein and Dracula, both starring Christopher Lee and Peter Cushing. She won the first role after director Terence Fisher saw her in an episode of BBC TV's Dixon of Dock Green. She only appeared in the two films and in two television shows before marrying the stockbroker, later Rev. Gerald Alfred Reddington, and retiring from acting in 1958.

== Death ==
Gaunt died on 27 November 2016 on the Isle of Wight at the age of 84.

== Filmography ==
Year	Title	Role	Notes
1957	The Curse of Frankenstein	Justine	
1958	Dracula	Vampire Woman	(final film role)
