= The Satanic Rites of Dracula =

- Theatrical release poster
- Directed by: Alan Gibson
- Screenplay by: Don Houghton
- Based on: Count Dracula and Professor Van Helsing by Bram Stoker
- Produced by: Roy Skeggs
- Starring: Christopher Lee; Peter Cushing; Michael Coles; William Franklyn; Freddie Jones; Joanna Lumley
- Cinematography: Brian Probyn
- Edited by: Chris Barnes
- Music by: John Cacavas
- Production company: Hammer Film Productions
- Distributed by: Columbia-Warner Distributors
- Release dates: 3 November 1973 (West Germany); 13 January 1974 (UK); 13 November 1978 (US)
- Running time: 87 minutes
- Country: United Kingdom
- Language: English
- Box office: £223,450

The Satanic Rites of Dracula is a 1973 British horror-spy film directed by Alan Gibson and produced by Hammer Film Productions. It is the eighth film in Hammer's Dracula series, a direct sequel to Dracula A.D. 1972, and the seventh and final one to feature Christopher Lee as Dracula. The film was also the third to unite Peter Cushing as Van Helsing with Lee, following Dracula (1958) and Dracula A.D. 1972 (1972).

The working title of the film was Dracula Is Dead... and Well and Living in London, a title which Lee described as "fatuous" and which was changed shortly before its official premiere. It was later released in the United States in 1978, retitled Count Dracula and His Vampire Bride.

== Plot ==
Secret Service agent Hanson barely escapes from an English country house, in which satanic rituals are being celebrated. Before he dies of his wounds, he reveals to his superiors that four prominent members of society – government minister John Porter, peer Lord Carradine, General Sir Arthur Freeborne and famous scientist Dr. Julian Keeley – are involved in a cult led by Chin Yang. Photos of the four dignitaries taken by Hanson are developed, and a fifth photo, apparently showing an empty doorway, is assumed to be a mistake. In order to avoid any reprisals by Porter, Secret Service official Colonel Mathews calls in Scotland Yard's Inspector Murray to work on the case independently. Murray suggests consulting a noted occult expert, Professor Lorrimer Van Helsing.

The cult kidnaps the Secret Service secretary Jane, who is later bitten by Count Dracula. Murray, Secret Service agent Peter Torrence and Van Helsing's granddaughter Jessica arrive at the country house. They separate; Murray and Torrence investigate inside the house, where they meet Chin Yang. Jessica enters the house through the cellar, where she finds Jane chained to a wall; she is revealed to be a vampire. The ensuing commotion awakens other female vampires who are likewise imprisoned, but they attempt to feed on Jessica. The agents hear Jessica's screams and come to her rescue. Murray kills Jane with a stake, and he escapes the grounds with Jessica and Torrence. Meanwhile, Van Helsing visits his scientist friend, Keeley, whom he recognized among the four conspirators. The mentally unstable Keeley is involved in bacteriological research designed to create a virulent strain of the bubonic plague. Van Helsing is shot by a guard and passes out. When he revives, Keeley's dead body hangs from the ceiling, and the plague bacillus is gone.

Keeley referred to the 23rd of the month, which Van Helsing discovers is the "Sabbath of the Undead". Keeley's research notes lead Van Helsing to the reclusive property developer D. D. Denham, who funded Keeley's research. Van Helsing speculates that the fifth photo of an empty doorway may actually have been of Dracula, whose image cannot be captured; he theorizes that Dracula wants to finally die, but in his evil, will want to destroy all of humanity with him. Van Helsing visits Denham in his headquarters (built on the church yard where Dracula died in the previous film) and discovers that he is actually Dracula. He tries to shoot Dracula with a silver bullet, but is beaten by the Count's conspirators. Dracula decides that killing Van Helsing would be too simple and has him moved to the country house. Jessica, Murray, Mathews and Torrence, while observing the country house, are attacked by snipers. Torrence and Mathews are killed, and Murray and Jessica are captured. Murray awakes in the cellar and escapes the clutches of Chin Yang, revealed to be a vampire herself. After staking her through the heart with a mallet, he destroys the other female vampires with clear running water from the fire sprinkler system.

Dracula arrives at the house with Van Helsing. He announces to his henchmen that Jessica will be his consort, uncorrupted by the plague that his "four horsemen" – including Van Helsing – will carry out into the world. The conspirators, who had considered the plague a threat not to be used, begin to question their master. Dracula's hypnotic command brings them back under his control. He commands Porter to break the vial, releasing the bacteria and immediately infecting him. Murray overpowers a guard in the computer room. The guard's metal baton smashes a computer panel, causing an explosion that starts a fire and unlocks the ritual room. The uninfected Carradine and Freeborne escape, Murray rescues Jessica, and the infected Porter and the plague bacteria burn in the fire. Dracula attacks Van Helsing, but his prey escapes through a window into the woods. Van Helsing lures Dracula into a hawthorn bush where he is entangled. Van Helsing grabs a fence post and drives it through his heart. Dracula disintegrates into ashes, and Van Helsing retrieves the Count's ring.

== Cast ==
- Christopher Lee as Count Dracula / D.D. Denham
- Peter Cushing as Lorrimer Van Helsing
- Michael Coles as Inspector Murray
- William Franklyn as Peter Torrence
- Richard Vernon as Colonel Mathews
- Joanna Lumley as Jessica Van Helsing
- Valerie Van Ost as Jane
- Barbara Yu Ling as Chin Yang
- Freddie Jones as Dr. Julian Keeley
- Maurice O'Connell as Agent Hanson
- Richard Mathews as John Porter, MP
- Patrick Barr as Lord Carradine
- Lockwood West as General Sir Arthur Freeborne
- Peter Adair as Doctor
- John Harvey as Commissionaire
- Maggie Fitzgerald as Vampire Girl
- Pauline Peart as Vampire Girl
- Finnuala O'Shannon as Vampire Girl
- Mia Martin as Altar Girl
- Marc Zuber as Guard
- Paul Weston as Guard
- Ian Dewar as Guard
- Graham Rees as Guard

== Production ==
In addition to Christopher Lee and Peter Cushing returning from Dracula A.D. 1972, Michael Coles reprised his role of Inspector Murray. Lorrimer Van Helsing's granddaughter, Jessica, portrayed by Stephanie Beacham in the previous film, was recast with Joanna Lumley. The screenplay, a mixture of horror, science fiction and spy thriller, was written by Don Houghton, who had also written the previous film. Television veteran John Cacavas composed the original score.

Production began in November 1972. The working title of the film was Dracula Is Dead ... and Well and Living in London, a reference to the stage and film musical revue Jacques Brel is Alive and Well and Living in Paris (1968). Lee was not amused. Speaking at a 1973 press conference announcing the feature, he said:

I'm doing it under protest ... I think it is fatuous. I can think of twenty adjectives – fatuous, pointless, absurd. It's not a comedy, but it's got a comic title. I don't see the point.

The film was eventually retitled, but was still marketed in French as Dracula vit toujours à Londres (Dracula Is Still Living in London).

As film historian Jonathan Rigby has observed, the feature "wrapped on 3 January 1973, 15 years to the day" after Dracula, the first film in the Hammer series, finished shooting. This was the last Hammer movie that Lee and Cushing would make together, although they would reunite one final time for House of the Long Shadows (1983). The film appears to have been the first to feature a silver bullet being used against a vampire. Hammer had previously featured a silver bullet from a melted cross in The Curse of the Werewolf (1961).

== Release ==
The Satanic Rites of Dracula premiered on 3 November 1973 in West Germany, followed by Melbourne, Australia on 26 December. It was released in the United Kingdom on 13 January 1974 as a double feature with Blacula.

The feature was not released in the United States until 1978, when Dynamite Entertainment distributed a heavily edited version under the title Count Dracula and His Vampire Bride.

== Reception ==
On the review aggregator website Rotten Tomatoes, 33% of 6 critics' reviews are positive, with an average rating of 5/10. AllMovie called it the "least interesting" film in the Hammer Dracula series. Time Out wrote, "a lot of weak action scenes and weaker lines, but still a vast improvement on Dracula A.D. 1972."

== See also ==
- Vampire film
- Hammer filmography
