= James Bernard (composer) =

British film composer (1925–2001)

- Born: James Michael Bernard; 20 September 1925; Kochel am See, Bavaria, Germany
- Died: 12 July 2001 (aged 75); Jamaica
- Occupation: Composer
- Years active: 1950–1998
- Known for: Hammer horror film scores
- Notable work: The Quatermass Xperiment, The Curse of Frankenstein, Dracula
- Partner: Paul Dehn (1950s–1976; his death)
- Awards: Academy Award for Best Story (1952)

James Michael Bernard (20 September 1925 – 12 July 2001) was a British film composer, particularly associated with horror films produced by Hammer Film Productions. Beginning with The Quatermass Xperiment, he scored such films as The Curse of Frankenstein and Dracula. He also occasionally scored non-Hammer films including Windom's Way (1957) and Torture Garden (1967).

== Early years and World War II ==
Bernard was educated at Wellington College, previously attended by Christopher Lee, who starred in many of the Hammer horror films Bernard scored. In an interview late in his life, Bernard recalled that in his mid-teens three of his favourite books were The Devil Rides Out, She, and The Hound of the Baskervilles. While still a schoolboy, Bernard met Benjamin Britten when the composer came to consult the school's art master, Kenneth Green, about the stage designs for Peter Grimes. Britten took interest in an inter-house music competition, and advised Bernard on the music he was writing. The two stayed in touch during Bernard's service in the RAF from 1943 to 1946, and Britten encouraged him to learn the principles of composition.

During the war, Bernard worked with the team dedicated to breaking the code of the German Enigma machine, specialising in deciphering intercepted Japanese messages. During those years, on occasion Bernard came to London to turn pages for Britten while he played piano in recitals.

In 1944, Bernard met Paul Dehn, who was then a Major working for Military Intelligence, Section 6 (MI6). This was the start of a lifelong partnership, the two men moving in together in an apartment on London's King's Road while Bernard was still serving with the RAF in 1946.

== Musical training and first scores ==
After being demobbed, Bernard enrolled as a student at the Royal College of Music (RCM) in 1947, studying under Herbert Howells. He graduated in 1949. In 1950, Britten asked him to copy out the full score of his new opera Billy Budd for his publishers Boosey & Hawkes, inviting him to stay at his home in Aldeburgh. He went to the opera's opening night with Benjamin Britten's housekeeper and the librettist, E. M. Forster.

Paul Dehn, by now a writer and critic, asked Bernard to collaborate with him on the original screenplay for the Boulting brothers film Seven Days to Noon (1950). For this Paul Dehn and James Bernard shared the 1952 Academy Award for the Best Writing, Motion Picture Story. Then in 1953 Bernard received his first commission to write incidental music: for a radio play by Patric Dickinson, The Death of Hector. Not having been taught orchestration at the RCM, Bernard often turned for advice to Imogen Holst, whom Britten had recommended when Bernard had asked for someone "with whom I could study or go to or take things to".

Bernard also sought Holst's assistance when writing incidental music for a broadcast radio production of The Duchess of Malfi, which starred Richard Burton, Peggy Ashcroft and Paul Scofield. The music for this so impressed John Hollingsworth, effectively the music director of Hammer Film Productions, that when the composer originally scheduled to score The Quatermass Xperiment fell ill the job was offered to Bernard.

== Work for Hammer ==
The Quatermass Xperiment was scored for strings and percussion only at John Hollingsworth's instruction: "I don't think he trusted me with anything more than a small string orchestra", Bernard later suggested. "At that time John Hollingsworth was one of the chief conductors of the Royal Ballet at the Royal Opera House, Covent Garden, so he used players from the Opera House orchestra," Bernard elsewhere wrote. The score, predating Bernard Herrmann's for Psycho by five years, has been cited as the first film score to treat strings in an unconventional, non-romantic manner, including the use of tone clusters and asking string players to bow on the wrong side of the bridge. Again, Bernard showed the score to Imogen Holst before he committed it to the recording sessions for the soundtrack.

Following his scores to X the Unknown and Quatermass 2, Bernard scored Hammer's first horror film, The Curse of Frankenstein (1957). This included some music he had originally composed for The Duchess of Malfi. Next came Dracula (1958), in which the title cue featured a motif based on the sound Dra-cu-laaaaa, inspired by a suggestion Paul Dehn made to Bernard. Other Hammer horror scores include Kiss of the Vampire (1962), The Gorgon (1964), Dracula: Prince of Darkness (1966), The Plague of the Zombies (1966), The Devil Rides Out (1968), Dracula Has Risen from the Grave (1968), Frankenstein Must Be Destroyed (1969), Frankenstein and the Monster from Hell (1974) and The Legend of the 7 Golden Vampires (1974). He also scored non-horror Hammer films such as The Hound of the Baskervilles (1959), The Stranglers of Bombay (1959), The Terror of the Tongs (1961), The Damned (1963), The Secret of Blood Island (1964), and She (1965).

A distinctive trait in Bernard's Hammer scores are their use of clashing harmonies, often created by doubling a motif a tone higher, as in his Dracula theme. His music is also frenzied and pacey at times, frequently making use of percussion such as timpani and snares. The Devil Rides Out (1968) and The Plague of the Zombies (1966) are good examples of this. However, he could also write lushly romantic melodies, such as appear in Frankenstein Created Woman (1967), Taste the Blood of Dracula (1970) and Scars of Dracula (also 1970). Unlike the majority of film composers, Bernard orchestrated almost all of his work.

== Final decades ==
Paul Dehn died in 1976. Working on She (1965), Bernard first met the man who later became his second life partner, actor Ken McGregor (died 24 January 1994), with whom he lived in Jamaica until McGregor's death there in 1994. Bernard then returned to London and lived there for the remainder of his life.

In later years, he was called upon by silent film historian Kevin Brownlow to write an original score for F.W. Murnau's silent horror film Nosferatu (1922/1997) and for Brownlow's documentary Universal Horror (1998) on the horror films of the American studio. He also wrote the score to Paul Cotgrove's 2001 short horror film Green Fingers (starring Hammer actresses Ingrid Pitt and Janina Faye). David Huckvale's critical biography of the composer, James Bernard – Composer to Count Dracula was published by McFarland in 2006.
