= Jenny Hanley =

British actress (born 1947)

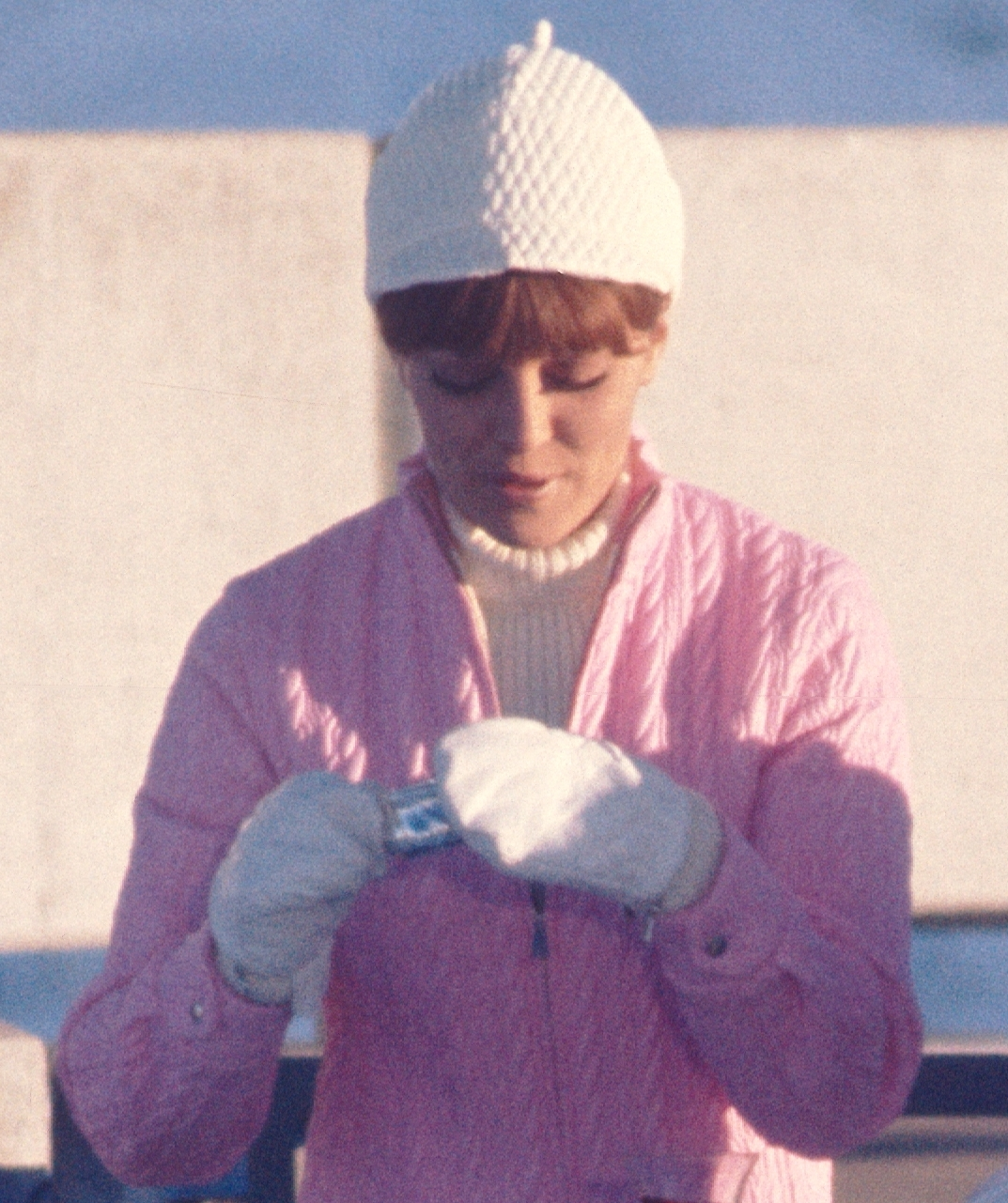
- Hanley in Switzerland filming On Her Majesty's Secret Service, 1968
- Born: 15 August 1947 (age 79); Gerrards Cross, Buckinghamshire, England
- Occupations: Actress, presenter
- Years active: 1968–present
- Spouse: Herbie Clark (m. 1980; div. 1997)
- Children: 2
- Parent(s): Dinah Sheridan; Jimmy Hanley
- Family: Jeremy Hanley (brother)

Jenny Hanley (born 15 August 1947) is an English actress and presenter. She was one of the presenters of the ITV children's magazine programme Magpie from 1974 to 1980. She currently presents a show on Boom Radio.

== Early life and education ==
Hanley is the daughter of actress Dinah Sheridan and actor Jimmy Hanley. After her education at schools in Southern England and in Switzerland, she trained as a nanny and undertook modelling work. Through her mother she is of Russian-Jewish and German descent.

== Personal life and family ==
Hanley's grandmother was a photographer who, as Studio Lisa, had privileged access to the royal family, photographing both Princess Elizabeth and Princess Margaret in relaxed, family poses; and the next generation, Prince Charles, Princess Anne, Prince Andrew and Prince Edward, in informal shots. She also helped to launch the career of a male model who later became an actor, Roger Moore.

Her brother, Sir Jeremy Hanley, had a career as an accountant and later became a Conservative Party MP.

Hanley married Herbie Clark in 1980, and they had two sons before divorcing in 1997.

== Television and film career ==
Her film appearances include the James Bond film On Her Majesty's Secret Service (1969), The Private Life of Sherlock Holmes (1970), and the Hammer horror film Scars of Dracula (also 1970). She appeared in the 3D film The Flesh and Blood Show (1972).

She has also appeared on television as an actress in such series as Department S, The Persuaders!, The Adventurer, Softly, Softly: Task Force, Warship, Man About the House and Return of the Saint. Hanley appeared on Magpie from 1974 to 1980.

In 1980, Hanley stepped in to co-present one edition of Saturday Night at the Mill following the dismissal after just five shows of Arianna Huffington. This proved a success with viewers and she returned as co-host for the entire 1981 season. She has appeared in the dictionary corner of Countdown. She teamed up with Tony Blackburn to present a morning chat show on Sky Channel.

== Radio career ==
Hanley has had regular radio shows as a presenter on stations including BBC Radio Berkshire, Radio Saga (on which she played music and interviewed guests) and, since February 2021, Boom Radio.

== Filmography ==
Title	Year	Role	Notes
Joanna	1968	Married Woman	Uncredited
On Her Majesty's Secret Service	1969	The Irish girl	
Scars of Dracula	1970	Sarah Framsen	
The Ballad of Tam-Lin	1970	Caroline	
The Private Life of Sherlock Holmes	1970	Prostitute	Scene deleted
Danny Jones	1972	Sue	
The Flesh and Blood Show	1972	Julia Dawson	
Soft Beds, Hard Battles	1974	Michelle	
Percy's Progress	1974	Miss Teenage Lust	
Alfie Darling	1975	Receptionist	
