= Peter Sasdy =

British film director

- Born: May 27, 1935 (age 91); Budapest, Hungary
- Occupation: Director

Peter Sasdy (born 27 May 1935 in Budapest, Hungary) is a British film and television director. In addition to his numerous TV credits, notable among which is the Nigel Kneale-scripted The Stone Tape (1972), he directed several horror films for Hammer, including Taste the Blood of Dracula (1970), Countess Dracula (1971) and Hands of the Ripper (1971). Sasdy directed the 1960s TV series Wuthering Heights, The Tenant of Wildfell Hall and The Spoils of Poynton for BBC TV. He also directed several early episodes of the hit TV series Minder, and earned a Razzie Award for his direction of the 1983 film The Lonely Lady.

He directed three adaptations of Sherlock Holmes stories: The Illustrious Client, the first episode of the 1965 BBC series starring Douglas Wilmer as Sherlock Holmes and Nigel Stock as Dr. Watson; one episode (The Case of the Blind Man's Bluff) of Sherlock Holmes and Doctor Watson from 1979–1980, starring Geoffrey Whitehead and Donald Pickering; and the 1991 TV film Sherlock Holmes and the Leading Lady, starring Christopher Lee and Patrick Macnee. Sasdy directed Welcome to Blood City for Warner Bros., perhaps the first cinema release movie in the "virtual-reality" genre. From 1985 to 1987, he directed the Thames Television production of The Secret Diary of Adrian Mole Aged 13 3/4. He also produced and directed Kingsley Amis's Ending Up for Thames TV, which starred John Mills, Wendy Hiller and Michael Hordern.
