= Alan Gibson (director) =

Canadian director (1938–1987)

Alan Gibson (April 28, 1938 – July 5, 1987) was a Canadian director active in British film and television.

== Career ==
Gibson was born in Canada and moved to the UK to train at the Bristol Old Vic. After working as an actor in the theatre, he began directing when BBC2 was launched. He worked on film and TV for the rest of his career.

Gibson was particularly notable in his early years for his work in horror. The films he directed include Journey to Midnight (1968), Crescendo (1970), Dracula A.D. 1972 (1972), The Satanic Rites of Dracula (1973), Checkered Flag or Crash (1977), Witness for the Prosecution (1982), and A Woman Called Golda (1982) starring Ingrid Bergman. His television work includes Eh Joe (1965), The Capone Investment (1974), Churchill and the Generals (1979), and The Charmer (1987).

Gibson came up with the idea for "The Flipside of Dominick Hide" (1980), a Play for Today that he co-wrote with Jeremy Paul and directed. As a child he had overheard his family discussing a recent UFO report and thought to himself: "Since there had been sightings of flying saucers recorded throughout history, it occurred to me that they were man-made machines, time machines from the future". The two men collaborated again on its sequel Another Flip for Dominick (1982). "The Flipside of Dominick Hide" attained viewing figures of 5.3 million and a reaction index of 75, compared to an average Play for Today score of 59. The Radio Times letter editor said that "no other single new BBC TV play in 1980 attracted so much correspondence" – highlighting the public's affection for the show.

== Personal life and death ==
Gibson lived in London with his wife Kate (d. 1997) and their daughters. He died of cancer in 1987 at the age of 49, just a few months before his last work The Charmer was broadcast.

The Canadian writer Graeme Gibson was his brother.

== Awards ==
Churchill and the Generals was nominated for five BAFTA awards, and A Woman Called Golda won a Golden Globe and several Emmy awards.

== Filmography ==
1987

- The Charmer (TV Mini-Series) (6 episodes)

1985

- Martin's Day (film)
- The Best of All Time Horror Classics (Video documentary)

1984

- Helen Keller: The Miracle Continues (TV Movie)

1980–1982

- Play for Today (TV Series) (2 episodes)

– Another Flip for Dominick (1982) – The Flipside of Dominick Hide (1980)

- Witness for the Prosecution (TV Movie)
- Tales of the Unexpected (TV Series) (10 episodes)

– The Skeleton Key (1982) – The Absence of Emily (1982) – Operation Safecrack (1982) – The Way to Do It (1981) – There's One Born Every Minute (1981)

- A Woman Called Golda (TV Movie)
- Hammer House of Horror (TV Series) (2 episodes)

– The Two Faces of Evil (1980) – The Silent Scream (1980)

1979

- Churchill and the Generals (TV Movie)
- Atom Spies (TV Movie)

1978

- Z Cars (TV Series) (1 episode)

– Prey (1978)

- People Like Us (TV Mini-Series) (5 episodes)

– Another War (1978) – The Biter Bit (1978) – Re-Arrangements (1978) – Breakout (1978) – The First Lessons in Love (1978)

1977

- 1990 (5 episodes)

– What Pleases the Prince (1978) – Hire and Fire (1978) – Witness (1977) – Decoy (1977) – Creed of Slaves (1977)

- Checkered Flag or Crash (film)
- Raffles (TV Series) (2 episodes)

– The Chest of Silver (1977) – The Gold Cup (1977) ... (exterior sequences)

1976

- Dangerous Knowledge (TV Series) (6 episodes)

– Dividends (1976) – Surrender Value (1976) – Death Risk (1976) – Clause for Concern (1976) – A Deadly Policy (1976)

- Thriller (TV Series) (2 episodes)

– Sleepwalker (1976) – Murder in Mind (1973)

1975 – Quiller (TV Series) (1 episode) – Mark the File Expendable (1975)

- Village Hall (TV Series) (3 episodes)

– The Rough and the Smooth (1975) – Distant Islands (1974) – Dancing in the Dark (1974)

- Churchill's People (TV Series) (2 episodes)

– O Canada (1975) – The Coming of the Cross (1975)

1974 – The Capone Investment (TV Series) (6 episodes) – Final Innings (1974) – One Killer Makes Two (1974) – Money in the Bank (1974) – The Citizen from Chicago (1974) – The Grass Is Greener (1974)

- Intent to Murder (TV Movie)
- The Playboy of the Western World (TV Movie)

1973–1974

- Orson Welles Great Mysteries (TV Series) (7 episodes)

– The Furnished Room (1974) – Ice Storm (1974) – Death of an Old-Fashioned Girl (1973) – The Monkey's Paw (1973) – Money to Burn (1973)

- The Satanic Rites of Dracula (film)

1973

- Crown Court (TV Series) (9 episodes)

– The Black Poplar: Part 3 (1973) – The Black Poplar: Part 2 (1973) – The Black Poplar: Part 1 (1973) – Who Was Kate Greer: Part 3 (1973) – Who Was Kate Greer: Part 2 (1973)

1972–1973

- The Adventures of Black Beauty (TV Series) (6 episodes)

– The Witch (1973) – Clown on Horseback (1972) – Mantrap (1972) – The Viking Helmet: Part 2 (1972) – The Viking Helmet: Part 1 (1972)

- The Man in the Wood (TV Movie)

1970–1972

- ITV Sunday Night Theatre (TV Series) (5 episodes)

– Last Year's Confetti (1972) – Consequences (1972) – Time Lock (1972) – The Silver Collection (1971) – The Policeman and the Cook (1970)

- Dracula A.D. 1972 (film)
- Budgie (TV Series) (1 episode)

– Twenty-Four Thousand Ball Point Pens (1972)

1970

- Confession (TV Series) (1 episode)

– The Wind Blew Her Away (1970)

- Goodbye Gemini (film)
- Crescendo (film)

1969

- BBC Play of the Month (TV Series) (1 episode)

– The Marquise (1969) – Detective (TV Series) (1 episode) – Elimination Round (1969)

- Plays of Today (TV Series) (1 episode)

– The English Boy

1967–1969

- Thirty-Minute Theatre (TV Series) (3 episodes)

– Remote Control (1969) – Another Moon Called Earth (1967) – Teeth (1967)

1968–1969

- Journey to the Unknown (TV Series) (3 episodes)

– Poor Butterfly (1969) – Somewhere in a Crowd (1968) – Jane Brown's Body (1968)

1968

- Journey to Midnight

1967–1968

- Boy Meets Girl (TV Series) (2 episodes)

– Purposes of Love (1968) – A High-Pitched Buzz (1967)

1965–1968

- Theatre 625 (TV Series) (10 episodes)

– Home Sweet Honeycombe (1968) – The Lost Years of Brian Hooper (1967) – The Cupboard (1967) – On the March to the Sea (1966) – The Melody Suit (1966)

1968

- Mogul (TV Series) (3 episodes)

– The Wrecking of the Sierra Nevada (1968) – The Day the Sea Caught Fire (1968) – Stop It, You're Breaking My Heart (1968)

1968

- Public Eye (TV Series) (1 episode)

– There's No Future in Monkey Business (1968)

1966–1967

- The Wednesday Play (TV Series) (2 episodes)

– Kippers and Curtains (1967) – The Private Tutor (1966)

1966

- Double Image (TV Mini-Series documentary) (play director - 2 episodes)

– Impossible Odds (1966) ... (play director) – A Separate Peace (1966) ... (play director)

- A Separate Peace (TV Movie)
- Eh, Joe? (TV Movie)

1965

- 199 Park Lane (TV Series) (2 episodes)

– Episode #1.6 (1965) – Episode #1.5 (1965)

1964–1965

- Story Parade (TV Series) (4 episodes)

– The Unbearable Bassington (1965) – The Flaw in the Crystal (1964) – Shadow of Guilt (1964) – Not for Every Eye (1964)

1964–1965

- Thursday Theatre (TV Series) (2 episodes)

– The Kidders (1965) – Write Me a Murder (1964)
