= Roy Skeggs =

British film producer (1934–2018)

- Born: 1934
- Died: 29 December 2018 (aged 84)
- Occupation: Film producer and television producer

Roy Skeggs (April 1934 – 29 December 2018) was a British film and television producer. He worked for Hammer Films and is credited, along with Brian Lawrence, for revitalising the company following receivership in 1979.

== Career ==
Skeggs and Lawrence were former board members of Hammer Films who had resigned to form their own production company, Cinema Arts. When Hammer entered receivership in 1979, Skeggs and Lawrence returned at the request of company management to develop a new direction for the ailing production house.

Skeggs relocated Hammer Films to Hampden House in Buckinghamshire, and shifted production away from horror films featuring Dracula and Frankenstein towards anthologies and television serials. Production schedules were shortened and new features were largely shot on location in Buckinghamshire rather than the more expensive studio backlot.

Skeggs created the Hammer House of Horror television series, which debuted in the UK on 13 September 1980.

== Death ==
Skeggs died in December 2018 at the age of 84.
