= Aida Young =

British film producer (1920–2007)

- Born: 11 August 1920; Stepney, London, England
- Died: 12 August 2007 (aged 87); London Borough of Camden

Aida Young (née Cohen; 11 August 1920 – 12 August 2007) was a British film producer. Her credits include She.

== Life ==
Young was born in 1920 to an Orthodox Jewish family in Stepney where her family ran a pawnbroker shop. She wanted to be an actress and after college she worked for a company who made documentary films.

Young entered the film industry in the 1950s. She was a second assistant director on the Hammer's success with The Quatermass Xperiment (1955).

Young was production manager of The New Adventures of Charlie Chan (1957–58) for British television. She took the same role on The Invisible Man (1958–59) and The Adventures of William Tell (1959–60), all half-hour programmes produced by ITC. With Danger Man in 1964, produced by the same company, she was finally the producer.

Young worked as an associate producer for MGM on the romantic film Light in the Piazza (1962). Later, she had two successes with She and One Million Years BC. These starred Ursula Andress and Raquel Welch and were released in 1965 and 1966. One of her tasks as associate producer was to ensure that the press did not reveal that the glamorous lead, Raquel Welch, was actually a married mother of two. Two years later she was credited as a film producer for The Vengeance of She. In 1970 she did another cave-girl movie, When Dinosaurs Ruled the Earth before Young did horror film for Hammer Films, before switching to TV spinoff films. These were based on popular British TV comedies such as Steptoe and Son (1972) and The Likely Lads (1976). In 1981 she worked on The Bunker in Paris which won an Emmy Award for NBC.

Young married Gideon Young at Golders Green Synagogue on 21 July 1948. She died from pneumonia at the Royal Free Hospital in the London Borough of Camden in 2007.
