= Plomley =

Plomley is a surname. Notable people with the surname include:

- Brian Plomley (1912–1994), Australian historian
- Roy Plomley (1914–1985), English radio broadcaster, producer, playwright, and novelist
