= Doreen Carwithen =

English composer (1922–2003)

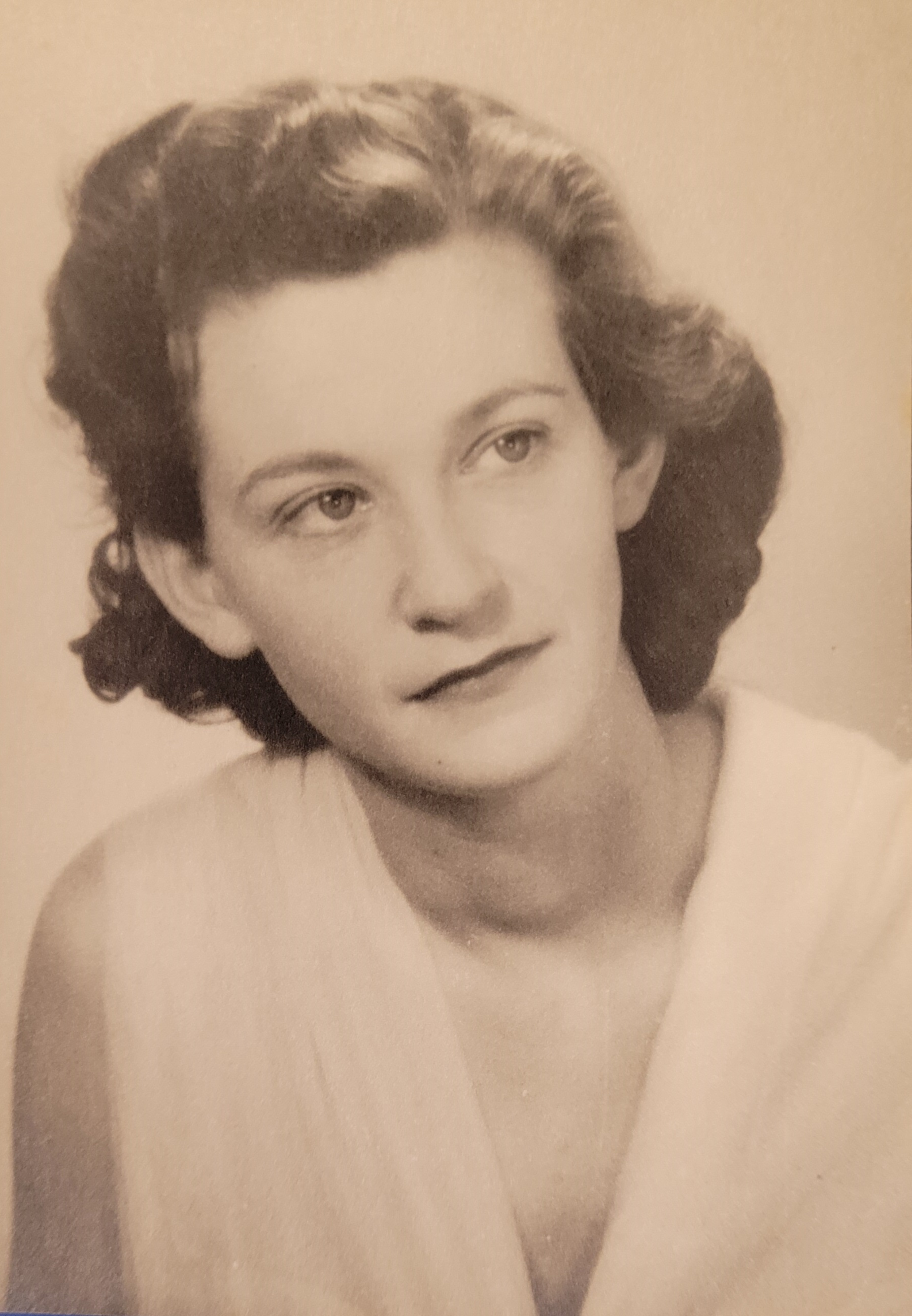
- Born: Doreen Mary Carwithen; 15 November 1922; Haddenham, Buckinghamshire
- Died: 5 January 2003 (aged 80); Forncett St. Peter
- Education: Royal Academy of Music
- Occupation: Composer
- Spouse: William Alwyn Smith

Doreen Mary Carwithen (15 November 1922 – 5 January 2003) was an English composer of classical and film music. She was also known as Mary Alwyn following her marriage to William Alwyn.

== Biography ==
Doreen Carwithen was born at 8 High Street, Haddenham, Buckinghamshire on 15 November 1922, in the house attached to her father's bakery and grocery. As a child, she received her first music lessons from her mother Dulcie, an aspiring concert pianist and pupil of Tobias Matthay, who gave up her wider ambitions to become a music teacher after her marriage in 1921. Doreen studied both piano and violin with her from the age of four. Her younger sister Barbara Carwithen (born 1926) received similar tuition and also became a talented musician and composer.

At the age of 16, Doreen Carwithen began composing by setting Wordsworth's "I Wandered Lonely as a Cloud" for voice and piano. In 1938, she began taking cello lessons with Peers Coetmore, and in 1941, she entered the Royal Academy of Music and played the cello in a string quartet and with orchestras. She was a member of the harmony class of William Alwyn, who began to teach her composition. Her first orchestral work, the overture ODTAA (One Damn Thing After Another), was premiered at Covent Garden by the London Philharmonic Orchestra, conducted by Adrian Boult on 2 March 1947. The previous year she had become the first recipient of a J. Arthur Rank Film Scholarship.

In 1961, she became William Alwyn's devoted secretary and amanuensis, becoming his second wife in 1975, adopting Mary Alwyn as her married name, as she disliked the name Doreen, and Mary was her middle name. She later worked as a Sub Professor of Composition at the RAM. After her husband's death in 1985, she founded the William Alwyn Archive and William Alwyn Foundation to promote his music and facilitate related research projects.

She then also resumed interest in her own music. In 1999, a stroke left her paralysed on one side. She died at Forncett St Peter, near Norwich, on 5 January 2003.

== Works ==
=== Film Music ===
Doreen Carwithen wrote scores for over 30 films, including Harvest from the Wilderness (1948), Boys in Brown (1950), Mantrap (released in the U.S. as Man in Hiding) (1952), The Men of Sherwood Forest (1954) and Three Cases of Murder (1955). In two of the films - The Stranger Left No Card (1952) and On the Twelfth Day (1954) - the music took the place of dialogue. Music from the score of the short British Transport Films documentary East Anglian Holiday (1954) was later reused in her Suffolk Suite. She gained a reputation in the film industry for her professionalism and speed under pressure: her score for Elizabeth Is Queen, the official film of the coronation of Queen Elizabeth II, had to be completed in just three days.

Carwithen worked for the J. Arthur Rank Organisation at Denham Film Studios, initially hand-copying parts and serving as an uncredited ghost composer, before receiving solo credit in 1948 for the film score for To the Public Danger. The studio worked at “breakneck speed” due to its growing output; composers often had very little time to compose, rehearse, and record their scores. Music director Muir Mathieson was impressed with Carwithen’s work and helped secure her additional commissions. Carwithen was known to attend recording sessions with a stopwatch, stating “A bar too many or too few and the whole effect is ruined.”

=== Orchestral Works ===
Her orchestral works include an overture ODTAA (One Damn Thing After Another) (1945, after the novel by John Masefield); a Concerto for piano and strings (1948); the overture Bishop Rock (1952) and the Suffolk Suite (1964). Scores and parts for Bishop Rock and Suffolk Suite are available from Goodmusic. She also wrote a Violin Sonata (1951) and two award-winning (Clements Prize, 1948 and Cobbett Award, 1952) but little-known string quartets, which received their first recordings in 1998, as well as seven solo songs, composed early in her career. Philip Lane arranged East Anglian Holiday from the 1954 film score; the chamber orchestra arrangement is available through Faber Music.

Carwithen was an accomplished pianist herself, as is evident from the piano writing in her 1948 Piano Concerto. The piece was premiered by soloist Iris Loveridge at the Proms in 1952, the only work by a woman to be featured that season. But her neo-classical three movement Sonatina (1946) was written for her lifelong friend, the pianist Violet Graham Cole (1923–2000). She also edited for performance the second piano concerto by her husband William Alwyn.

A Doreen Carwithen Music Festival took place in the village of Haddenham in Buckinghamshire, England between 30 June and 3 July 2022, marking her centenary. For the same reason, the BBC Proms included three of her works - Bishop Rock, the Second String Quartet and ODTAA - in the 2022 season, and her life and work were featured in the BBC Radio Three series Composer of the Week in November 2022. The Carwithen Music Festival returned to Haddenham in the summer of 2025.

== Selected works ==
- Cello Sonatina (1944)
- String Quartet No. 1 (1945)
- Piano Sonatina (1945-6)
- ODTAA, overture (1947)
- Concerto for Piano and Strings (1948)
- Four Preludes for piano (1950)
- String Quartet No. 2 in two movements (1950) (Cobbett Prize winner)
- Violin Sonata (1951)
- Bishop Rock, overture (1952)
- Five Diversions for wind quintet (1953)
- Suffolk Suite (1964)

=== Film scores ===
Date	Title	Director
1948	Harvest from the Wilderness	
1948	To the Public Danger	Terence Fisher
1949	Boys in Brown	Montgomery Tully
1952	The Stranger Left No Card	Wendy Toye
1953	Elizabeth is Queen	Terry Ashwood
1953	Mantrap	Terence Fisher
1954	East Anglian Holiday	Michael Clarke
1954	The Men of Sherwood Forest	Val Guest
1955	Break in the Circle	Val Guest
1955	On The Twelfth Day...	Wendy Toye
1955	Three Cases of Murder	Wendy Toye

=== Recordings ===
- Orchestral Works, Chandos CHAN9524 (1997)
- Violin Sonata, String Quartets Nos. 1 & 2, Chandos CHAN9596 (1997)
- Film Music, Dutton Epoch CDLX 7266 (2011)
- Piano Music by Alwyn & Carwithen (Sonatine), SOMMCD 0133 (2013)
- Concertos for Piano and Strings (Piano Concerto), SOMMCD 0254 (2014)
- Music for String Quartet (Quartets Nos. 1 & 2), SOMMCD 0194 (2019)
- One Hundred Years of British Song, Volume II (seven Carwithen songs), SOMMCD 0636 (2021)
