= Yesterday's Enemy =

- Original American release film poster
- Directed by: Val Guest
- Written by: Peter R. Newman
- Produced by: Michael Carreras
- Starring: Stanley Baker; Gordon Jackson
- Cinematography: Arthur Grant
- Edited by: Alfred Cox; James Needs
- Production company: Hammer Film Productions
- Distributed by: Columbia Pictures
- Release date: 17 September 1959 (U.K.)
- Running time: 95 min
- Country: United Kingdom
- Language: English

Yesterday's Enemy is a 1959 Hammer Films British war film in MegaScope directed by Val Guest and starring Stanley Baker, Guy Rolfe, Leo McKern and Gordon Jackson set in the Burma Campaign during World War II. It is based on a 1958 BBC teleplay by Peter R. Newman, who turned it into a three-act play in 1960. The TV play was reportedly based on a war crime perpetrated by a British army captain in Burma in 1942. Gordon Jackson repeated his role from the BBC teleplay as Sgt. Ian McKenzie.

Columbia Pictures co-produced the film with Hammer Films in an agreement for five co-productions a year with Columbia providing half the finance. The film, including extensive jungle and swamp scenes, was shot entirely on indoor sets in black and white and Megascope. The film has no musical score.

Director Val Guest later said that Yesterday's Enemy was one of his films of which he was the most proud. In 2013, film magazine Total Film included Yesterday's Enemy in their list of 50 Amazing Films You've Probably Never Seen.

== Plot ==
The lost remnants of a British Army brigade headquarters make their way through the Burmese jungle, retreating from the Japanese. The group, numbering over thirty, is led by Captain Alan Langford because the most senior officer, a brigadier, is one of several who are wounded. The group arrives at a small village which is enemy-occupied. After a short but costly battle, the small detachment of Japanese soldiers in the village is wiped out.

Among the Japanese dead is a colonel, an unusually high-ranking officer to be with such a small group. The dead officer possesses a map with unknown markings. A Burmese man is caught trying to flee and he is revealed to be an informer employed by the Japanese. Langford interrogates the man about the dead colonel and the map and when he refuses to talk, Langford selects two men from amongst the villagers, saying he will have them both executed if the informer does not co-operate. The villagers plead for mercy and the doctor, a civilian correspondent named Max and the padre angrily protest at Langford's decision, but the captain is unmoved. The two hostages are killed by Langford's men, the informer remaining silent until the captain prepares to execute him next, leading him to immediately begin divulging what he knows. The map contains plans for a major Japanese flanking attack which aims to cut off the British army from its supply lines and leave it surrounded. Langford is anxious to send a warning, but the group's radio has been damaged.

Langford orders Sergeant McKenzie to execute the informer and then announces that the British wounded are to be left behind so as not to impede the group's progress back to Allied territory. The doctor, Max and the padre are enraged by the decision, but the dying brigadier and the other wounded agree to remain in the village. The group's presence in the village is discovered by enemy scouts, so Langford decides to send McKenzie, the doctor and two others back to British headquarters to raise the alarm, thinking a smaller group will have a better chance of getting through whilst the remainder of the group will remain to defend the village and delay the enemy as long as possible. Langford offers Max and the padre the chance to go with them, but they both refuse, suggesting that another two men go in their place. McKenzie's group leaves the village, but it is soon ambushed and all in it are killed.

Langford takes a party of men out to ambush the approaching Japanese, leaving Lieutenant Hastings and the others to defend the village. The surviving Burmese evacuate, an English-speaking woman remarking bitterly to Hastings, "Japanese, British - all the same". After a bloody engagement, Langford's group is all killed or captured. The enemy, using the POWs as a human shield, approach the village, but Langford shouts at Hastings to open fire. Just before the village falls, the radio operators manage to send out a weak signal from the repaired set to alert headquarters of the enemy's plans, although it is not clear if the message gets through. The handful of surviving British are now all POWs. The Japanese commander, Major Yamazaki, who speaks English, demands to know about the missing colonel and the map, suspecting that Langford knows about the attack plans.

Yamazaki lines up all of the prisoners in front of a firing squad and informs Langford that unless he agrees to talk, the major will order his troops to shoot them. Given just two minutes to make his choice, Langford bolts towards the transmitter in an attempt to signal HQ, but he is shot dead. Impressed by Langford's courage, Yamazaki bows to his corpse, saying "I would have done the same", whilst outside the padre calmly leads the other prisoners in the Lord's Prayer as they await their execution. The final image is a silent shot of the memorial cross located within the Kohima War Cemetery. The cemetery is located in Kohima City, the state capital of Nagaland, India. The Kohima Epitaph on a plate of bronze reads: "When you go home, tell them of us and say, for your tomorrow, we gave our today."

== Cast ==
- Stanley Baker as Captain Alan Langford
- Guy Rolfe as Padre
- Leo McKern as Max
- Gordon Jackson as Sergeant MacKenzie
- David Oxley as Doctor
- Richard Pasco as 2nd Lieutenant Hastings
- Philip Ahn as Yamazaki
- Bryan Forbes as Dawson
- Wolfe Morris as The Informer
- David Lodge as Perkins
- Percy Herbert as Wilson
- Russell Waters as Brigadier
- Barry Lowe as Turner
- Burt Kwouk as Japanese Soldier
- Timothy Bateson as Simpson (uncredited)
- Edwina Carroll as Suni (uncredited)
- Alan Keith as Bendish (uncredited)
- Arthur Lovegrove as Patrick (uncredited)
- Geoffrey Bayldon as Dying Soldier (uncredited)

== Production ==
The film featured one of several anti-hero leads played by Stanley Baker in the late 1950s.

== Critical response ==
Terence Pettigrew (writing in 1982) wrote "Yesterday's Enemy was criticised at the time for its depiction of British Army cruelty to the natives in a progressively desperate fight to survive. Nothing is done to soften the harshness of armed conflict on all concerned and the film delivers its strong anti-war message without flinching from the task."

Andrew Spicer (writing in 2001) wrote '(Stanley) Baker's officer hero Langford in Yesterday's Enemy is no gentleman. Langford's dilemma is that he feels he must break the Geneva Convention and kill civilians in order to obtain the information that may save many lives. Langford's men dislike him, the padre and the liberal war correspondent denounce him, but they all know he is their only chance of survival.'

Julian Upton, reviewing the film's 2009 DVD release, singled out Baker's performance. 'The film is worth seeing for Baker's performance alone. A kind of proto Peckinpah anti-hero, he'll commit war crime for the greater good of the operation.....but he'll risk his life to save men he's never civil to.'
