= Shatter (film) =

1974 British-Hong Kong film by Michael Carreras and Monte Hellman

- U.S. release poster with alternate title
- Traditional Chinese: 奪命刺客
- Simplified Chinese: 夺命刺客
- Hanyu Pinyin: Duó mìng cìkè
- Jyutping: Dyut6 ming6 chi3 haak3
- Directed by: Michael Carreras; Monte Hellman
- Screenplay by: Don Houghton
- Produced by: Michael Carreras; Vee King Shaw; Run Run Shaw
- Starring: Stuart Whitman; Ti Lung; Lily Li; Peter Cushing; Anton Diffring
- Cinematography: Brian Probyn; John Wilcox; Roy Ford
- Edited by: Eric Boyd-Perkins
- Music by: David Lindup
- Production companies: Hammer Film Productions; Shaw Brothers Studio
- Distributed by: Avco-Embassy
- Release dates: 6 December 1974 (UK); 5 January 1976 (US)
- Running time: 90 minutes
- Countries: United Kingdom; Hong Kong
- Languages: English; Mandarin

Shatter (Chinese: 奪命刺客; pinyin: Duó mìng cìkè; Jyutping: Dyut6 ming6 chi3 haak3, released in the United States as Call Him Mr. Shatter) is a 1974 action film directed by Michael Carreras and Monte Hellman, starring Stuart Whitman, Ti Lung, Lily Li, Anton Diffring and Peter Cushing (in his final Hammer Films production). It was the second and final international co-production between Hammer Film Productions of England and Shaw Brothers Studio of Hong Kong. It was distributed by Avco-Embassy.

== Plot ==
American hitman Shatter kills Ansabi M'Goya, the leader of the African state of Badawi, and takes a dossier of documents. He travels to Hong Kong to collect payment for this services but finds himself targeted; he survives two attempts to kill him and the police warn him to leave within 24 hours. He tries to get his money from Leber, a German banker, who denies all knowledge of the contract and refuses to pay. Shatter goes on the run and meets Mei Mee, who in turn introduces him to her friend Tai Pah. After witnessing Tai Pah's prowess in martial arts, Shatter makes a deal with him to be his bodyguard in exchange for half the money.

Chief Inspector Rattwood of the Royal Hong Kong Police Force informs Shatter that the contract on Ansabi was taken out by a crime syndicate who were providing him with arms in exchange for opium, which they distributed to secret laboratories throughout the world. Ansabi switched to buying his arms from China instead and the opium deal was threatened, so the syndicate had him killed and plan to install a successor who will continue the arms-for-opium scheme. The documents that Shatter stole contain a list of the laboratories.

Shatter makes a deal with Leber; $1 million for the list. The exchange is made but Leber's men ambush Shatter as he is leaving, killing Mei Mee and taking the money back. Tai Pah rescues Shatter, who vows revenge and travels to Macao to confront Leber. At his casino base, Leber reveals that Ansabi's own brother Dabula is to be installed as the new leader and that there is to be a show trial, which will convict Shatter and implicate the British government in the affair. To prevent him from talking, they will cut his vocal chords. Tai Pah appears just in time and he and Shatter fight off Leber's thugs before Shatter finally kills Leber and Dabula.

Shatter takes a payment of £10,000 from the Hong Kong authorities on condition that he never leaves Hong Kong.

== Cast ==
- Stuart Whitman as Shatter
- Lung Ti as Tai Pah
- Lily Li as Mai-Mee
- Anton Diffring as Hans Leber
- Peter Cushing as Chief Inspector Paul Rattwood
- Yemi Ajibade as Ansabi M'Goya / Dabula M'Goya
- Lau Kar-wing as Leber's bodyguard
- Lee Hoi-sang as Hanson Lee
- James Ma Tsan-Hsi as a Nak Muay
- Chiang Han as a Taekwondo-in
- Kao Hsiung as a Karateka
- Lo Wei as a thug

== Production ==
In May 1972, Michael Carreras returned to London from the Cannes Film Festival with a co-production deal that was made with the Canadian producer George Brown. Don Houghton provided Brown with a script for an action film originally titled Shoot. The film was originally set to start filming in Canada in August 1972 but was halted when Brown went bankrupt, leading to the project being shelved. Houghton's father-in-law had connections with Run Run Shaw, who ran Shaw Brothers studios. The original meetings between Carreras were set up for the production of the film The Legend of the 7 Golden Vampires, which also led to the production of Houghton's unused script for Shoot which was developed into Shatter.

Shatter was filmed from 17 December 1973, through 15 January 1974 on location in Hong Kong, including Kai Tak Airport. Monte Hellman was signed on to direct but was fired during production less than two weeks into shooting, leaving Carreras to finish the film himself. Carreras complained "In my opinion, the action scenes lack excitement, the dialogue scenes are dull and Hong Kong looks like a slum. I just don't know how to salvage it." Among the cast was Peter Cushing, it would be his last feature film for Hammer. Cushing's scenes were filmed in four days. Godfrey Ho (credited as 'Geoffrey Ho') was an assistant director.

A new score was added when the original Shaw Brothers score horrified music director Philip Martell who thought it "absolutely appalling".

== Release ==
After its British premiere in December 1974, Shatter was not theatrically released initially in the United Kingdom. Shatter was released in the United States as Call Him Mr. Shatter by Avco Embassy Pictures in March 1975. Shatter remained unreleased in the United Kingdom. until being distributed by EMI in September 1977. It was not released in Hong Kong until 1 July 1980.

Plans to turn Shatter into a television series starring Stuart Whitman were shelved. It was released on VHS in the United States with the alternative title They Call Me Mr. Shatter.

== Reception ==
Variety gave the film a negative review, finding the film "dull and sloppy, though there are a few scenes of entertaining hokum" noting Ti Lung's martial arts sequences being "choreographed with unusual skill, but that kind of stuff is getting stale by now" Carreras later spoke about the film stating it was "unfortunately, a bad picture, no question about it. We ran into all sorts of problems, and like all pictures that are bad, I think it was badly conceived from the start. One did all sorts of things to try and save it, but it didn't work."
