= The Blakes Slept Here =

- David King-Wood and Dorothy Gordon
- Directed by: Jacques Brunius
- Screenplay by: Jacques Brunius; Roy Plomley
- Produced by: Richard Massingham
- Starring: Harcourt Williams; David King-Wood; Dorothy Gordon; Peter Coke
- Cinematography: Robert Navarro
- Edited by: Bill Megarry
- Production company: Martin Films
- Release date: 1953
- Running time: 38 minutes
- Country: United Kingdom
- Language: English

The Blakes Slept Here is a 1953 British second feature ('B') short Technicolor film directed by Jacques Brunius and starring Harcourt Williams, David King-Wood and Dorothy Gordon. The screenplay was by Brunius and Roy Plomley.

== Plot ==
The film chronicles the life of a middle-class British family, the Blakes, from roughly 1850 to the end of World War II.

== Cast ==
- Harcourt Williams as narrator
- David King-Wood as Richard
- Dorothy Gordon as Laura
- Peter Coke as William
- Ursula Howells as Emily
- John Richmond as Albert
- Pamela Stirling as Vicky
- David Markham as Edward
- Rachel Gurney as Betty

== Reception ==
The Monthly Film Bulletin wrote: "This film has a promising idea and develops it lightly and quite agreeably, though both its dialogue and its commentary could have done with more wit and less reliance on cliché. Domestic scenes and a little newsreel material – Queen Victoria's jubilee, King George V's coronation, the first world war – add up to social history without tears, but without much subtlety to it either."

Kine Weekly wrote: "Cameo cavalcade, pivoting on a Mayfair house and beautifully photographed in Technicolor. Elegant, graceful, smoothly acted and cleverly interlaced with topicals, it traces the history of a family through four generations, and subtly tempers fact with popular sentiment and humour, and makes gentle sport of women's emancipation. The animated scrapbook, generously bound, is confidently recommended for majority of halls and good and high-class ones In particular. Delightful 'quota'."

Picture Show wrote: "Delightful flashback story of the past generations of a family introduced by the young daughter of the last generation. ... Amusing, pleasant entertainment smoothly acted and well-directed in Technicolor."

Picturegoer wrote: "The "Cavalcade " theme is an old one – the life and times of a family from Victoria's reign, through two wars to the present day. But on the showing of this elegantly made British featurette, there is every excuse for reviving it when it is re-told with delicate grace and wit."

The Daily Film Renter wrote: "Gently barbed irony at expense of past generations, all inhabitants of some London house, ending with satire on present occupant's "modern" mode of expression and modernistic furnishings. In Technicolor. ... Its gently ironic treatment makes it more suited to the appreciative audience of the superior type of theatre. Technically it is good. So is its Technicolor photography. Both dialogue and cutting are crisp despite the olde-worlde nature of much of the subject."

In The British 'B' FIlm, Chibnall and McFarlane wrote: "the film was stylishly directed by Jacques Brunius and presented the biography of an English bourgeois family, told in a series of flashbacks narrated by Harcourt Williams and using period film footage."
