= Richard Wordsworth =

English actor (1915–1993)

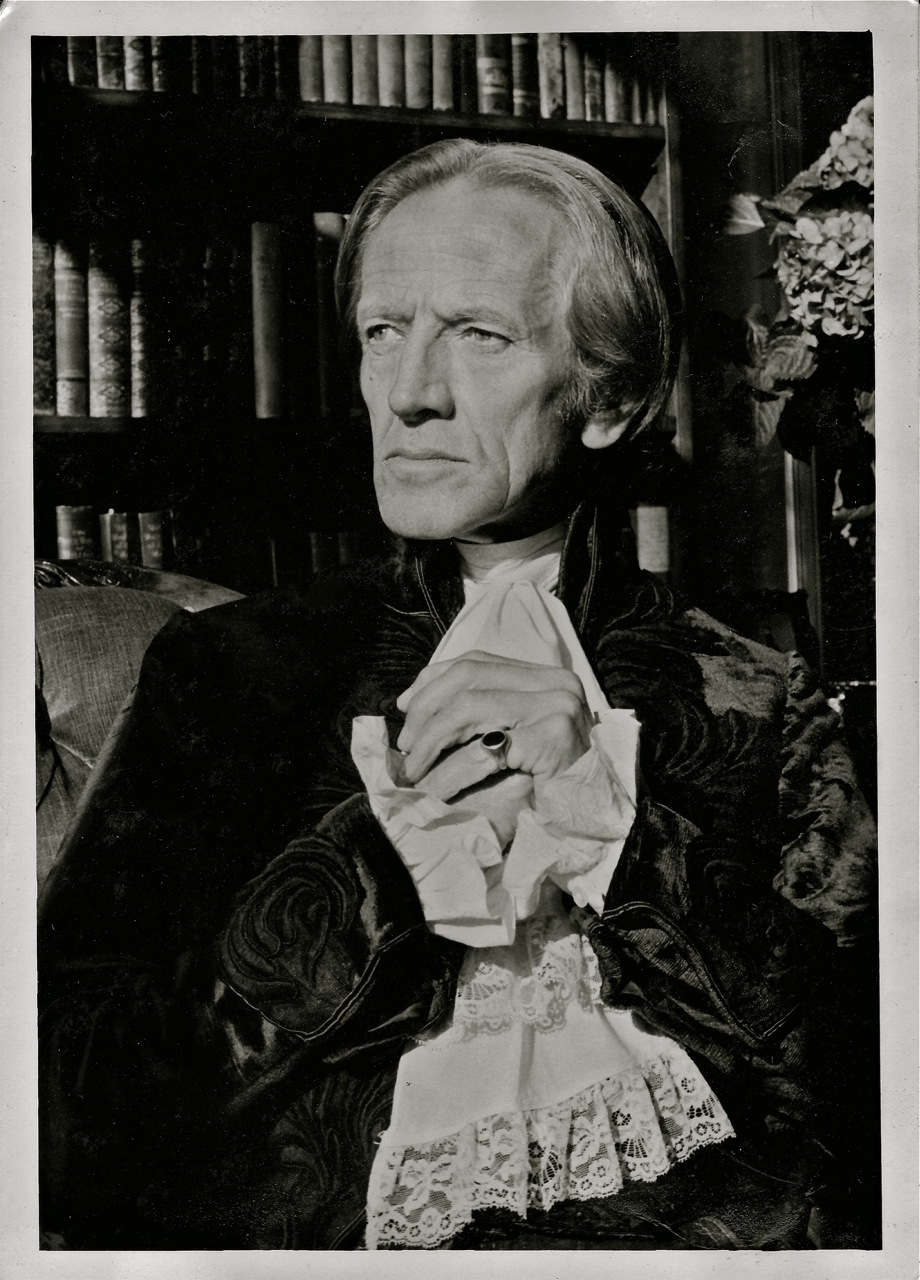
- Playing Thomas Jefferson
- Born: Richard Curwen Wordsworth; 19 January 1915; Halesowen, Worcestershire, England
- Died: 21 November 1993 (aged 78); Kendal, Cumbria, England
- Occupation: Actor
- Relatives: William Wordsworth (great-great-grandfather)

Richard Curwen Wordsworth (19 January 1915 – 21 November 1993) was an English character actor. He was the great-great-grandson of the poet William Wordsworth.

== Early life and career ==
As a young man he followed in the footsteps of his clergyman father, reading Divinity at Cambridge University. But he quickly found acting more to his taste and, after performing at the Cambridge Footlights, he decided to study drama at the Embassy School of Acting in London.

This proved an excellent choice. He quickly developed a talent for character acting which sustained him and his family through a long and richly varied career. In classical theatre he worked with John Gielgud, Donald Wolfit, Anthony Quayle and Richard Burton. After successful Shakespearian seasons at the Old Vic and Stratford-upon-Avon, he starred in the musical Lock Up Your Daughters which launched the Mermaid Theatre in London. He also found success as Captain Hook in several Christmas productions of Peter Pan. Later he would tour Australia as Fagin in the musical Oliver which he also produced.

His film career included a standout performance as the monstrous astronaut in The Quatermass Xperiment, which launched Hammer Film Productions’ famous run as the UK’s foremost producers of horror movies. Later he played a scene as a sinister taxidermist with James Stewart (whom he described as 'a perfect gentleman') in Alfred Hitchcock's second version of The Man Who Knew Too Much. He also played leading parts in British TV dramas such as Huntingtower and The Tripods.

In the final decades of his life he developed The Bliss of Solitude a one-man tribute to his great ancestor with which he toured Britain and the United States. He also founded the Wordsworth Summer School – a week of poetry, lectures and walks in his beloved Lake District.

== Filmography ==
Year	Title	Role	Notes
1955	The Quatermass Xperiment	Victor Carroon	
1956	The Man Who Knew Too Much	Ambrose Chappell Jr	Uncredited
1957	Time Without Pity	Maxwell – the MP	
1958	The Camp on Blood Island	Dr. Robert Keiller	
1958	The Revenge of Frankenstein	Up Patient	
1961	The Curse of the Werewolf	The Beggar	
1969	Lock Up Your Daughters	Coupler	
1970	Song of Norway	Hans Christian Andersen	
