= Peter R. Newman =

English screenwriter

Peter Richard Newman
- Born: 4 June 1926; Ilford, Essex, England
- Died: 22 February 1975 (aged 48); Ilford, London, England

Peter Richard Newman (4 June 1926 – 22 February 1975) was an English television screenwriter in the 1950s and 1960s.

== Early life ==
He was born in Ilford, Essex.

== Writing ==
He wrote a television play, Yesterday's Enemy, which he later turned into a screenplay for Val Guest; the film version was released in 1959 by Hammer. As a three-act play, it was published by Samuel French in 1960. He was commissioned for further screenplays, but the relationship between Newman and Hammer deteriorated over financial concerns. His Western screenplay, The San Siado Killings, would become the basis for the 1961 Eurowestern film Savage Guns. The latter, one of the first Spaghetti Westerns, was credited to Edmund Morris. It was also the first western to be shot on location in Almeria, Spain, an area which would be often used in later Spaghetti Westerns during the next two decades.

He wrote The Sensorites for the first season of Doctor Who in 1963–64. This would be Newman's only contribution to Doctor Who, and indeed his last credit for British television. He subsequently developed severe writer's block and took a job as a porter at the Tate Gallery.

== Personal life ==
In an attempt to join the army before he was of age, Newman fled his school and exchanged clothes with a deserter he subsequently met, not knowing at the time that the soldier was a deserter. This resulted in some trouble with the police, who sought out his family under the belief that it was Newman who had deserted. Unable to return to school as he was expelled, he did eventually join the army legally and was deployed to Burma, where he met and befriended a Japanese soldier. It is likely his experiences there greatly influenced his writing in both Yesterday's Enemy and The Sensorites.

== Death ==
He died in 1975 after suffering a cerebral haemorrhage following an accident at work in which he fell down a flight of stairs and hit his head on an iron radiator.
