= Savage Guns (1961 film) =

1961 film

The Savage Guns
- Theatrical release poster
- Directed by: Michael Carreras
- Written by: Story: Peter R. Newman; Screenplay: Edmund Morris
- Produced by: Jimmy Sangster; José Gutiérrez Maesso
- Starring: Richard Basehart; Don Taylor; Alex Nicol; José Manuel Martín; Fernando Rey; José Nieto
- Cinematography: Alfredo Fraile
- Edited by: Pedro del Rey; David Hawkins
- Music by: Antón García Abril
- Distributed by: MGM
- Release dates: November 1961 (Spain); 1 October 1962 (US)
- Running time: 83 min.
- Countries: United Kingdom; Spain
- Language: English
- Box office: 6,922,551 (Pts)

The Savage Guns (Spanish: Tierra brutal) is a 1961 Eurowestern film, an international co-production by British and Spanish producers. Based on a specially commissioned screenplay, The San Siado Killings, written by Peter R. Newman and directed by Michael Carreras, the film is credited as the first traditional Spaghetti Western.

The film was noticeably set apart from previous "classic" American westerns starring an American leading cast (Richard Basehart, Don Taylor and Alex Nicol) and Spanish actors in supporting roles (José Manuel Martín, Paquita Rico, María Granada, Fernando Rey and José Nieto) as well as its unique use of the deserts, palm trees, agaves and whitewashed villages of southern Spain. It was also the first western to be shot on location in Almeria, Spain, an area which would be often used in later Spaghetti Westerns during the next two decades.

== Plot ==
The film takes place in a small valley in the Mexican state of Sonora, near the Arizona Territory, around 1870. Steve Fallon, a drifter and gun-for-hire, is severely exhausted when travelling through the barren landscape and is found by Mike Summers and his wife, Franchea. He is taken into their home and, while recovering, he learns that a local land baron, Ortega, is pressuring local ranchers to sell their land to him with the help of Danny Pose and his gang of outlaws. Fallon also develops feelings for Fanchea's sister, Juana.

Mike Summers, a former Confederate officer, had become a pacifist following his experiences during the American Civil War. Refusing to even wear a gun, he is defenseless when Danny Pose arrives at the ranch to collect "protection" money. Confronted by Fallon, Pose is disarmed and loses to Fallon in a brawl. He is eventually run out of town after a gunfight with Fallon ends with three of his companions dead.

Ortega responds by taking over the gang himself and leading a raid against the Summers ranch and, in one of the film's most graphic scenes, he has Fallon's hands crushed under a wagon. Danny Pose soon returns, under the belief that Fallon has been killed, and turns on Ortega murdering his former employer. Riding to the Summers ranch, he sees the helpless Fallon and threatens to shoot him when Summers grabs a nearby gun and kills Pose in order to save Fallon's life.

== Cast ==
- Richard Basehart as Steve Fallon — an exhausted drifter who is taken in by Mike and Franchia Summers. Eventually nursed back to health, he decides to help the Summers in their fight against Danny Pose and Ortega.
- Don Taylor as Mike Summers — a former major in the Confederate Army, he lives with his wife on their ranch outside Sonora. Although he and his wife are victims of the Danny Pose, his experiences during the American Civil War have caused him to become a pacifist.
- Paquita Rico as Franchea — the wife of Mike Summers.
- José Nieto as Ortega — a local land baron who attempts to dominate the area by buying up cheap land from rival ranchers in the valley. He using a bandit gang to force ranchers to sell to him as well as to terrorize the local townspeople.
- Alex Nicol as Danny Pose — an outlaw and bandit leader in the pay of Ortega, his gang collects extortion money for Ortega. He is both violent and ruthless, however he displays cowardly traits when confronted alone.
- Maria Granada as Juana — the sister of Franchia, she becomes involved in a romantic relationship with Steve Fallon.
- Fernando Rey as Don Hernán

== Production ==
Having formed an independent film company, Capricorn Productions, with writer and director Jimmy Sangster, this was Carreras first film since breaking away from Hammer Studios. By 1960, Hollywood studios had drastically cut down on producing western films and problems with distribution left European countries in short supply. Producer José Gutiérrez Maesso, later writer of The Ugly Ones, Django and The Hellbenders, had noted the advantages of the area's desert landscape after visiting Almeria during the late 1950s.

Carreras had soon developed a unique idea for producing a European western using the desert location of Almeria, Spain as an alternative to the southwestern United States. Successfully organizing a collaboration between Capricorn and the Madrid-based production companies Tecisa and CEA Studios, he also gained financial backing from Metro-Goldwyn-Mayer which recognized the vastly reduced cost of filming in the area.

=== Casting ===
Like Carreras, the actors selected for the leading roles were all Hammer Studio regulars. His partner Jimmy Sangster was largely responsible for signing American actors Richard Basehart, Don Taylor and Alex Nicol. Of the three, only Nicol would appear in a second Spaghetti Western, the 1964 film Gunfighters of Casa Grande. Savage Guns would be Taylor's last starring role in a feature film while Richard Basehart would find work as a television actor, best known as Admiral Harriman Nelson in the 1960s science fiction series Voyage to the Bottom of the Sea. Taylor's role was originally meant for Kerwin Mathews who pulled out of the film at the last minute.

Their Spanish counterparts, veteran actors José Nieto, Fernando Rey and Paquita Rico, were also given prominent supporting roles in the film; this was also the film debut of Maria Granada. She would star in two other Spaghetti Westerns, Gunfighters of Casa Grande (1964) with Alex Nicol and Son of a Gunfighter (1965) with Fernando Rey, being cast as father and daughter in the latter film.

Rey would also go on to star in a number of other Spaghetti Westerns, most notably Navajo Joe (1966) and Compañeros (1970), while Nieto appeared in Outlaw of Red River (1965) and The Hellbenders (1967).

José Manuel Martín, while appearing in a minor role, proved to be one of the most visible character actors with appearances in Gunfighters of Casa Grande (1964), Minnesota Clay (1965), A Pistol for Ringo (1965), A Bullet for the General (1966), Train for Durango (1968) and Revenge of Trinity (1970).

Other former cast members also made frequent cameo appearances including:

- Rafael Vaquero (Django, The Ugly Ones, Outlaw of Red River, Gunfight at Red Sands, The Hellbenders)
- Rafael Albaicín (Django, Navajo Joe, Arriva Sabata!, China 9, Liberty 37)
- Víctor Bayo (Outlaw of Red River, The Return of Ringo, Who Killed Johnny Ringo?)
- Alfonso Rojas (Gunfight at Red Sands, Face to Face, Go Kill Everybody and Come Back Alone, Arriva Sabata!)
- Xan das Bolas (Gunfight at Red Sands, Between God, the Devil and a Winchester)
- Víctor Israel (For a Few Dollars More, The Good, the Bad and the Ugly)
- Sergio Mendizábal (The Good, the Bad and the Ugly)

=== Filming ===
The majority of the filming took place in Almería during late 1961 being released in Spain in November and the following year, then throughout the rest of Europe in early 1962. After nearly a year of its initial release, Savage Guns made its American premiere with assistance from MGM on 1 October 1962.

== Reception ==
Although Savage Guns was well-financed and produced, certainly in comparison with later films produced in the area during the next few years, the film was considered a box office failure earning only 6,922,551 Pts (US: $66,023), and forced the close of the Capricorn studio following its release. The film's performance at the box office also reaffirmed Hammer Studios decision not to add westerns to its roster reserved for gothic horror and thriller films.

It was also considered particularly violent for its time, as in one scene Basehart's hands are crushed under the wheels of a wagon, and received an "above 15" rating in Finland (K-16) and Sweden (15 År).

However, according to MGM records the movie made a profit of $103,000.

== Cinematic influence ==
Savage Guns was originally intended as a European version of the classic American western in terms of the general storyline, which closely follows Shane. The film also displayed many traits which would define later Spaghetti Westerns both in look and style, in particular, the anti-hero characters, the unique setting and its graphic violence. One example was the hero, Richard Basehart, who wore black while the villain, Alex Nichol, wore white.

The Danny character is close to Alex Nichols' earlier performance in Anthony Mann's The Man From Laramie where he in fact wounds the hand of the hero. This motif would later appear in Django.

Absent from the film were the distinctive soundtracks used in future Spaghetti Westerns, made popular by such composers as Francesco DeMasi, Bruno Nicolai and Ennio Morricone.

Carreras' use of the Spanish desert landscape was utilized not only by later Spaghetti Western directors such as Sergio Leone, but also used by major Hollywood studios including Lawrence of Arabia, Patton and Cleopatra.
