= Stephen Dartnell =

British actor (1932–1989)

- Dartnell in Doctor Who: The Sensorites (1964)
- Born: Steven Dartnell; 1932
- Died: 1 December 1989 (aged 57); Glasgow, Scotland
- Occupation: Actor
- Years active: 1955–1966

Stephen Dartnell (1932 – 1 December 1989) was a British actor, who appeared in several television programmes. He is best known for his two 1964 appearances in the first season of Doctor Who. He portrayed Yartek, leader of the Voord, in The Keys of Marinus and John, a mineralogist who has been driven to mania, in The Sensorites. Dartnell also made appearances in the 1960 feature films Circle of Deception and Oscar Wilde. He was also a theatre director and was active with the Citizens Theatre in Glasgow.

== Personal life ==
As a gay young man during the early 1950s, Dartnell found himself the victim of homophobic abuse when a youth threw paint over him and mocked his sexuality. The youth then went home and told his father that the actor had propositioned him. The father went to the police but when the case came to court, the judge threw it out for being indefensible and the father and son were fined for wasting police time and perjury. As a result, for fear of bad publicity, Dartnell was kicked out of Joan Littlewood's Theatre Workshop (as was Harry Greene for sticking up for him) but was supported throughout this ordeal by Harry H. Corbett and Marjie Lawrence.

== Filmography ==
=== Film ===
Year	Title	Role	Notes
1960	Oscar Wilde	Cobble	
1960	Saturday Night and Sunday Morning	Clubhouse worker	uncredited
1960	Circle of Deception	Brunner	uncredited
1972	Second Best	—N/a	Director/Writer (short film)

=== Television ===
Year	Title	Role	Notes
1955	BBC Sunday Night Theatre	Military recruit	Season 6, episode 44: "The Makepeace Story #3: Family Business"
1955	Othello	Sailor	TV movie
1960	ITV Television Playhouse	Jack Palmer	Season 5, episode 30: "Incident"
1964	Doctor Who	Yartek John	Season 1 (7 episodes)
1965	A Tale of Two Cities	Jacques One	Series 1 (4 episodes)
1966	Theatre 625	Barman	Season 3, episode 21: "A Man Like That"
