= The Stranger Left No Card =

1952 British short film by Wendy Toye

- DVD cover
- Directed by: Wendy Toye
- Written by: Sidney Carroll
- Produced by: George K. Arthur
- Starring: Alan Badel
- Cinematography: Jonah Jones
- Edited by: Jean Barker
- Music by: Muir Mathieson; Doreen Carwithen
- Production company: Meteor Films
- Distributed by: British Lion Film Corporation (UK)
- Release date: 1952
- Running time: 23 minutes
- Country: United Kingdom
- Language: English

The Stranger Left No Card is a 1952 British short film directed by Wendy Toye and starring Alan Badel in his screen debut. It was adapted from the story of the same name by Sidney Carroll.

== Plot ==
A stranger arrives in a small town, costumed as a flamboyant itinerant magician with a folding bag of tricks. The eccentric behaviour of "Napoleon", as he becomes known, soon gives him a reputation for harmless, flamboyant buffoonery. After ten days in town, he visits a businessman, Mr. Latham. Latham is known to keep regular hours and the stranger bedevils him with irritating magic tricks. The last of these tricks leaves Latham handcuffed in his office.

Slowly, speaking all the while, Napoleon's monologue grows slower and sadder. It is revealed that he has been in costume for over a week to confuse witnesses: he removes the lifts from his shoes to reveal his actual short height; he removes his false beard, eyebrows and wig, to show his face. Latham framed this man, Jason Smith, and he served 15 years in prison for a crime he did not commit. The magician then stabs the crooked businessman through the heart, and leaves (almost) unnoticed.

== Cast ==
- Alan Badel as The Stranger
- Cameron Hall as Mr. Latham
- Geoffrey Bayldon as clerk
- Eileen Way as secretary

== Music ==
The soundtrack is notable for the repetition of Hugo Alfvén's Swedish Rhapsody No. 1 (1903). Incidental music is by Doreen Carwithen.

== Critical reception ==
Monthly Film Bulletin said "This is a companion piece to George Arthur's Gentleman in Room Six [1951] and as a gimmick picture, it is infinitely more successful than the former film. The transition from the wacky atmosphere of the beginning to the grim business of the second half is cleverly handled, thanks in part to the capable performance of Alan Badel. Other assets are pleasant location shooting and a resourceful arrangement of Alfven's Midsommarvarka music. This type of short story film has serious limitations, but, as a competently made novelty. It is not without merit."

Leslie Halliwell wrote: "Smart little trick film which as a novelty has not been surpassed."

Britmovie wrote, "Toye delightfully handles the ever darkening story from its almost madcap beginning to the sinister finale."

== Accolades ==
The film won the Best Fiction award at the 1953 Cannes Film Festival, where it was described as "a masterpiece" by Jean Cocteau, the head of the jury.

== Remake ==
The film was remade, also directed by Toye, as Stranger In Town (1982), an episode of the British television series Tales of the Unexpected, starring Derek Jacobi and Clive Swift.

== Adaptations ==
"Here Today..." in Black Cat Mystery #50, June 1954, is an uncredited comic book adaptation with art by Sid Check and Frank Frazetta.
