= Hugh Pryse =

British actor (1910–1955)

- in Three Cases of Murder (1955)
- Born: 11 November 1910; London, England
- Died: 11 August 1955 (aged 44); Hammersmith, London, England
- Other name: John Hwfa H. Pryse
- Occupation: Actor
- Years active: 1939–1955

Hugh Pryse (1910–1955) was a British character actor. He was born on 11 November 1910 with the name John Hwfa Pryse, and was billed as Hwfa Pryse in the films Penn of Pennsylvania and "Pimpernel" Smith.

His stage work included Peter Brook's production of Dark of the Moon in 1948–9 at the Ambassadors Theatre in London and John Gielgud's 1954 staging of The Cherry Orchard at the Lyric, Hammersmith.

== Selected filmography ==
- School for Secrets (1946)
- Jassy (1947)
- The Woman in the Hall (1947)
- Easy Money (1948)
- The Story of Shirley Yorke (1948)
- Calling Paul Temple (1948)
- Christopher Columbus (1949)
- Dark Secret (1949)
- The Broken Horseshoe (1953)
- Botany Bay (1953)
- Marilyn (1953)
- The Happiness of Three Women (1954)
- Three Cases of Murder (1955)
- Port of Escape (1956)
