= Wendy Toye =

British dancer, stage and film director and actress (1917–2010)

Wendy Toye CBE
- Born: 1 May 1917; London, England
- Died: 27 February 2010 (aged 92); London, England
- Occupations: Dancer, choreographer, actress; film, television and stage director
- Years active: 1929–1997
- Spouse(s): Edward Selwyn Sharp (1940–1950)

Beryl May Jessie Toye, CBE (1 May 1917 – 27 February 2010), known professionally as Wendy Toye, was a British dancer, stage and film director and actress.

== Life and career ==
Toye was born in London. She initially worked as a dancer and choreographer both on stage and on film. She joined the Markova-Dolin Ballet Company as a soloist and was taken under the wing of Dame Ninette de Valois. She was soon collaborating with the likes of directors Jean Cocteau and Carol Reed. She first appeared on film as a dancer in Anthony Asquith’s film Dance Pretty Lady in 1931. In 1936 she was working on the opera film Pagliacci with the director Karl Grune, who, caught up in technical matters, asked Toye to direct the actors for him.

Toye directed the original production of the musical Bless the Bride in 1947. Her debut film short as a director, The Stranger Left No Card (1952), won the Best Fictional Short Film prize at the 1953 Cannes Film Festival, while her Christmas-themed short On the Twelfth Day… (1955) received an Oscar nomination in the Best Short Subject category. She directed films from the early 1950s until the early 1980s. Toye also was an advisor to the Arts Council and lectured in Australia.

She was attacked and robbed in her maisonette in Westminster on 27 November 1956. Two men stole jewellery and money.

On 6 January 1958, she appeared as Roy Plomley's guest on the BBC Radio programme Desert Island Discs. Her choices were wide-ranging, including Bach, Mahler and Lena Horne. She was the head of the jury at the 13th Berlin International Film Festival in 1963.

Among the many charities supported by Toye were the Theatrical Guild (formerly the Theatrical Ladies' Guild), where she helped backstage and front-of-house staff, and became president, and the Actors' Charitable Trust, to which she was recruited by Noël Coward, and of which she was vice president.

Toye married Edward Selwyn Sharp in 1940; they divorced in 1950.

Toye collaborated with the cartoonist and illustrator Ronald Searle on the stage play Wild Thyme (1955), and then on two films: On The Twelfth Day (1955) and The King’s Breakfast (1963). Searle designed the decor and costumes and painted the sets. Based on a poem by A A Milne, The King's Breakfast, with music by Ron Grainer, tells of a quest to find an appropriate spread for the royal bread. Initially sponsored by the British Butter Board, the film ended up having its premiere at Cannes. On its re-release in 2022, The Guardian described it as "a half-hour banquet of uproarious slapstick, dance and mime, with pantomime sets and costumes".

She was awarded the Silver Jubilee Medal in 1977, and appointed a Commander of the Order of the British Empire (CBE) in 1992 for services to the arts. She was made an honorary D. Litt. in 1996 by the City University. Toye was the subject of This Is Your Life in 1991, when she was surprised by Michael Aspel at the Alexandra Theatre, Birmingham.

She died on 27 February 2010 at Hillingdon Hospital, Greater London.

She refused to write or authorise a biography during her lifetime, in spite of encouragement by her friends and family. Her theatrical archive is mostly in the Wendy Toye Archive, V&A Theatre & Performance Department, THM/343 of the Victoria and Albert Museum, with some items in the University of Bristol Theatre Collection.

== Selected work ==
This list is a collation from three biographical dictionaries, an obituary and the information web sites from some of the theatres.

=== Early career ===
- Produced a ballet on the colours of the rainbow at the London Palladium when aged 10, 1927–28
- First professional appearance: Moth in A Midsummer Night's Dream, Old Vic, April 1930
- Winner, European Championship Solo Amateur competition at C. B. Cochrane's Charleston Ball at the Albert Hall, 1926

=== Dancer, choreographer and actress ===
- choreographer Mother Earth (Savoy), 1929
- Marigold (later Phoebe) & produced dances Toad of Toad Hall, 1931–32
- danced and choreographed for Camargo Society, Sadler's Wells Ballet, Rambert, British Ballet, 1930s (early)
- Danced in The Miracle (Lyceum Theatre), 1932
- Masked Dancer in Ballerina (Gaiety Theatre), 1933
- Member of Ninette de Valois' original Vic-Wells ballet, principal dancer in The Golden Toy (Coliseum), 1934
- Toured with Anton Dolin's Ballet, 1934–1935
- Dancer in Tulip Time (Alhambra), 1935
- Touring as principal dancer and choreographer with Markova-Dolin Ballet, 1935
- Love and How to Cure It (Globe), 1937
- Choreographer for George Black's productions (including Black and Blue, Black Velvet, Black Vanities, Strike a New Note, Strike it Again), 1937–44
- Gay Rosalinda (Palace Theatre), 1945–1948
- Follow the Girls, 1945
- Principal Girl in pantomime Simple Simon (Birmingham), 1947
- Winnie Tate in Annie Get your Gun (London Coliseum), 1947
- Ballet-hoo de Wendy Toye (Paris), 1948
- Three's Company in Joyce Grenfell Requests the Pleasure (Fortune) (choreography), 1954

=== Stage director ===
==== London ====
- Big Ben, Bless the Bride, Tough at the Top (Adelphi for C.B. Cochrane), 1946
- And So to Bed (New), 1951
- Second Threshold (Vaudeville), 1950s???
- Wild Thyme (Duke of York's), 1955
- Lady at the Wheel (Lyric, Hammersmith), 1958
- As You Like It (Old Vic), 1959
- Majority of One (Phoenix), 1960
- Virtue in Danger (Mermaid and Strand), 1963
- Robert & Elizabeth (Lyric), 1964
- On the Level (Saville), 1966
- Show Boat (Adelphi), 1971
- She Stoops to Conquer (Young Vic), 1972
- Soldiers Tale (Young Vic & Edinburgh Festival), 1967
- The Great Waltz (Drury Lane), 1970
- Cowardy Custard (Mermaid), 1972
- Stand and Deliver (Roundhouse), 1972
- The Englishman Amused (Young Vic), 1974
- Follow the Star (Westminster). 1976
- Oh Mr. Porter (Mermaid), 1977
- Colette (Comedy), 1980
- This Thing Called Love (Ambassadors), 1984
- Barnum (Victoria Palace) (assoc producer) 1985
- Singin' in the Rain (London Palladium) (assoc producer), 1983
- Get the Message (Molecule), 1987
- Ziegfeld (London Palladium), 1988
- Family and Friends (Sadler's Wells), 1988
- Till We Meet Again concert (Royal Festival Hall), 1989
- Captain Beaky's Heavens Up (Palace), 1990
- The Sound of Music (Sadler's Wells), 1992
- Under Their Hats (King's Head), 1994
- Gala (last night of old Sadler's Wells Theatre), 1996

==== Chichester Festival ====
- R loves J, 1973
- The Confederacy, 1974
- Follow the Star, 1974
- Made in Heaven, 1975
- Make Me a World, 1976
- Miranda, 1987

==== Watermill Theatre, Newbury ====
- Gingerbread Man, 1981
- Songbook, 1988
- Moll Flanders, 1990
- The Drummer, 1991
- See How They Run, 1992
- The Anastasia File, 1994
- Lloyd George Knew My Father, 1995
- Warts and All, Rogues to Riches, 1996
- 30 Not Out, 1997

==== Other UK ====
- Boots with Strawberry Jam (Nottingham Playhouse), 1968
- Once More with Music (Theatre Royal, Brighton), 1976
- Barnum (Manchester Opera House) (assoc producer), 1984
- Laburnum Grove (Watford Palace), 1987
- Mrs. Dot (Watford Palace), 1988
- Cinderella (Watford Palace), 1989
- Penny Black (Wavendon), 1990
- Mrs. Pat's Profession (workshop with Cleo Laine), 1991

==== Unknown location ====
- Dance for Gods, Conversations (??Stephenville), 1979
- Gala tribute to Joyce Grenfell, 1985

==== International ====
- Feu d'artifice, Marigny Theatre, Paris (co-director and choreographer), date unknown
- Peter Pan, (Imperial, New York) (co-director and choreographer) 1950
- Shakespeare Quatercentenary Latin American tour, 1964
- Noel and Gertie (Princess Grace Theatre Monte Carlo), 1984
- Celimar (Shaw Festival, Niagara-on-the-Lake, Canada), 1984
- Madwoman of Chaillot (Shaw Festival, Niagara-on-the-Lake, Canada), 1985
- Torville & Dean Ice Show World Tour (assoc producer), 1985
- Kiss Me Kate (Aarhus & Copenhagen), 1986
- Unholy Trinity (Stephenville Festival), 1986
- When That I Was (Manitoba Theater Center), 1988
- Oh! Coward (Playhouse Hong Kong), 1989
- The Kingfisher (Vienna English Theatre), 1993
- The Sound of Music (Vienna English Theatre), 1993
- Under Their Hats (Vienna English Theatre), 1995

=== Operas ===
- The Seraglio (Bath Festival), 1967
- The Impresario, Don Pasquale (Phoenix Opera), 1968
- The Mikado (Ankara), 1982
- Der Apotheker, la Serva Padrona (Aix-en-Provence festival), 1991

==== Sadler's Wells Opera/ENO ====
- Bluebeard's Castle, 1957
- The Telephone, 1957
- Russalka, 1959
- Die Fledermaus, 1959
- Orpheus in the Underworld, 1960
- La Vie Parisienne, 1961
- The Italian Girl in Algiers, 1968

==== ENO North ====
- La Cenerentola, The Merry Widow, 1979
- Orpheus in the Underworld, 1981

=== TV ===
- Esmi Divided, 1957
- Cliff in Scotland, c. 1965
- Girls Wanted – Istanbul, (BAFTA nomination) 1969
- Trial by Jury, 1982
- Tales of the Unexpected 1982

=== Films ===
Actress

- Dance Pretty Lady (1931)
- Invitation to the Waltz (1935)

Director

- The Stranger Left No Card (1952)
- The Teckman Mystery (1954)
- On the Twelfth Day... (1955)
- Raising a Riot (1955)
- All for Mary (1955)
- Three Cases of Murder (1955)
- True as a Turtle (1957)
- We Joined the Navy (1962)
- The King's Breakfast (1963)
