= Hugh Adcock (physician) =

British medical doctor and diplomat

Sir Hugh Adcock
- Born: 1847; Lambeth, United Kingdom
- Died: 13 April 1920 (aged 72–73); North Devon, United Kingdom
- Education: Guy's Hospital in London
- Occupations: British Medical Doctor and Diplomat
- Spouse: Catherine Elizabeth Ridgley

Sir Hugh Adcock CMG (1847 – 13 April 1920) was a British medical doctor and diplomat. He was chief physician to the Shah of Persia 1896–1905, and later Persian Consul-General in Florence.

== Early life and education ==
Adcock was born in Lambeth, Surrey in 1847, the son of Christopher Adcock (1809–1879), a surgeon, and his wife Catherine Elizabeth Ridgley (d.1902). He was educated at Guy's Hospital in London and in Cambridge, and obtained the diploma of physician (LRCP Edin.) and apothecary (LSA) in 1869; and of surgeon (MRCS Eng.) in 1872. He was in private practice in Heacham, Norfolk 1870–72, and in London 1872–88.

== Career in Persia ==
In 1889 Adcock moved to Teheran and accepted an appointment as Chief Physician to Prince Mozaffar ad-Din, then Wāli of Tabriz and a long-time heir to the State of Persia. When Mozaffar became Shah of Persia in 1896, Adcock was appointed Consulting Physician to the Shah, serving as such until replaced ten years later when he received an honorary appointment. There were speculations that political factors were behind his replacement by a French physician. He accompanied the Shah on his European tours, including the visit to the United Kingdom in August 1902.

In 1905, he moved to Florence where he served as Persian Consul-General. His later years were spent in Devon.

== Honours and decorations ==
Adcock received numerous decorations during his years in Persian service.

The British government appointed him a Companion of the Order of St Michael and St George (CMG) in 1897, following Mozaffar ad-Din's accession. He was appointed a Knight Bachelor in the 1901 New Year Honours, and received the knighthood on 11 February 1901. From Persia, he received the first class with cordon of the Order of the Lion and the Sun in 1897, and the Gold Star from Imperial College, Teheran, in 1893 for services during the severe cholera epidemic in the country the previous year.

He also received the 1st class of the Ottoman Order of Medjidie, the 1st class of the Bulgarian Order of Civil Merit, the 1st class of the Order of St Sava of Serbia, the 4th class of the French Legion of Honour, the 2nd class of the Austrian Order of the Iron Crown, the 2nd class of the Belgian Order of Leopold, and Commander of the Dutch Order of Orange-Nassau.

== Family ==
Adcock married first, in 1866, Elizabeth Watkin (1825–1908), daughter of Richard Watkin, a Waterloo veteran and later policeman in Enfield, Middlesex. Shortly after the death of his first wife, he married in Florence, in November 1908, Florence Beatrice Manera (1883–1927), daughter of Lieut.-Col. G. Manera, of the Indian Army. They had two sons. There was an adopted daughter, Daisy Adcock, who was the mother of the actor David King-Wood.

He died at Nymet Rowland, Lapford, North Devon, on 13 April 1920. Lady Adcock died in 1927.
