= Arthur Lovegrove =

British actor (1913–1981)

- Lovegrove The Marked One (1963)
- Born: Arthur William Lovegrove; 15 July 1913; Fulham, London, England
- Died: 7 November 1981 (aged 68); Surrey, England
- Occupations: Actor and dramaturge

Arthur Lovegrove (15 July 1913 – 7 November 1981) was a British actor and playwright. His comedy Goodnight Mrs Puffin starring Irene Handl, ran for 3 years in London's West End, from 1961.

== Filmography ==
- Noose (1948) – drummer (uncredited)
- Third Time Lucky (1949) – Flash's henchman (uncredited)
- Passport to Pimlico (1949) – tough man on underground train (uncredited)
- Meet Simon Cherry (1949) – Charlie Banks
- The Adventures of PC 49: Investigating the Case of the Guardian Angel (1949) – Bill (uncredited)
- The Blue Lamp (1950) – man being fingerprinted (uncredited)
- Night and the City (1950) – thug (uncredited)
- Waterfront (1950) – stoker (uncredited)
- Soho Conspiracy (1950) – tax collector
- The Galloping Major (1951) – punter (uncredited)
- Calling Bulldog Drummond (1951) – nightwatchman (uncredited)
- Emergency Call (1952) – Gunner Terry
- The Ringer (1952) – workman installing window bars (uncredited)
- Escape Route (1952) – Phillips (uncredited)
- Three Steps to the Gallows (1953) – Tommy, coach
- Genevieve (1953) – hotel doorman (uncredited)
- The Steel Key (1953) – Gilchrist
- Murder at 3 a.m. (1953) – Inspector Cobb
- The Runaway Bus (1954) – 2nd crook
- Devil on Horseback (1954) – valet
- The Lyons in Paris (1955) – Fred (uncredited)
- Break in the Circle (1955) – Bert
- Passage Home (1955) – 1st stoker
- A Kid for Two Farthings (1955) – postman (uncredited)
- The Quatermass Xperiment (1955) – Sgt. Bromley (uncredited)
- They Can't Hang Me (1955) – Nick (uncredited)
- Dial 999 (1955) – George (bar owner)
- Lost (1956) – railway workman (uncredited)
- Jumping for Joy (1956) - Tough (uncredited)
- The Secret of the Forest (1956) – Wally
- It's Never Too Late (1956) – hotdog vendor (uncredited)
- Safari (1956) - Blake
- The Weapon (1956) - (uncredited)
- The Counterfeit Plan (1957) - (uncredited)
- Carry On Admiral (1957) – orderly
- The Steel Bayonet (1957) – Pvt. Jarvis
- The Carringford School Mystery (1958)
- A Night to Remember (1958) – stoker (uncredited)
- Next to No Time (1958)
- Naked Fury (1959) – Syd
- Yesterday's Enemy (1959) – Patrick (uncredited)
- Wrong Number (1959) – Saunders
- The Shakedown (1960) – barman
- The Two Faces of Dr. Jekyll (1960) – cabby (uncredited)
- The Night We Dropped a Clanger (1961) – Sergeant
- Crooks Anonymous (1962) – Jones
- We Joined the Navy (1962) – CPO Froud
- The Marked One (1963) – Mr. Benson
- A Stitch in Time (1963) – hotel porter (uncredited)
- The Switch (1963) – Harry Lewis
- Clash by Night (1963) – Ernie Peel
- Carry On Cowboy (1965) – old ranchhand
- Smashing Time (1967)
- Inspector Clouseau (1968) – innkeeper (uncredited)
- The Rise and Rise of Michael Rimmer (1970) – studio doorman
- Eye of the Needle (1981) – Peterson
- Memoirs of a Survivor (1981) – man at newsstand

== Television ==
- Dial 999 (TV series)

' The Mechanical Watchman ', episode : Carson

== Plays ==
- Nasty Things, Murders
- Just Another Day
- Her Grace Will Be Here
- Goodnight Mrs. Puffin
- Clara's on the Curtains!
- Miss Adams Will Be Waiting
- There's Always Spring
