= David King-Wood =

British actor (1913–2003)

- Born: Oliver David King-Wood; 12 September 1913; Tehran, Iran
- Died: 3 September 2003 (aged 89); New York City, U.S.
- Education: Oxford University
- Occupation: Actor

David King-Wood (12 September 1913 – 3 September 2003) was a British actor.

He was born in Tehran, Iran (then Persia), the youngest of four children. His father was William King Wood (CIE, CBE), director of the Indo-European Telegraph Department, and his mother was Daisy Adcock, daughter of Sir Hugh Adcock (who was at one time the physician to the Shah of Persia).

King-Wood studied at Oxford University and was president of OUDS (Oxford University Dramatic Society), appearing in the Radio Times in April 1936 when playing Richard II for the society. He made his professional debut the following year, in a touring production of Murder in the Cathedral, then appeared in the 1937 season at Regent's Park Open Air Theatre. and in Measure for Measure and Richard III at the Old Vic. He also played repertory seasons at Birmingham, Oxford and Worthing.

During the Second World War, he served in the Royal Air Force. He was fluent in five languages, including Japanese. Post-war, he resumed his career in April 1946, playing Iachimo in Cymbeline at the Shakespeare Memorial Theatre in Stratford-upon-Avon. His British film credits included The Blakes Slept Here (1953) The Men of Sherwood Forest (1954), The Quatermass Xperiment (1955) and Jamboree (1957). For his final stage appearance in the UK, he played opposite Patrick Troughton in The Marvellous Story of Puss in Boots at the Fortune Theatre (1955-56).

He then relocated to New York and acted on Broadway for several years, most notably as Adam Hartley in The Hidden River (1957), Friar Francis in Much Ado About Nothing (1959) and Ronald Storrs in Ross (1962). He ended his professional life teaching English and French at St. Bernard's School in New York, as well as directing the annual Shakespeare play there.

He spent many hours in Central Park. More than 150 of his friends contributed to the David King-Wood Tree Fund, endowing in his name two European linden trees near the East Meadow. There's also a commemorative paving stone by the Olmsted Flowerbed at Literary Walk, mid-park at Sixty-Seventh Street.

== Filmography ==
Year	Title	Role	Notes
1952	No Haunt for a Gentleman		Uncredited
1954	A Stranger Came Home	Sessions	
1954	The Men of Sherwood Forest	Sir Guy Belton	
1955	Break in the Circle	Col. Patchway	
1955	The Quatermass Xperiment	Dr. Gordon Briscoe	
1955	The Stolen Airliner	Controller	
1956	Private's Progress	Gerald	
1957	Jamboree	Warren Sykes	
