= Three Cases of Murder =

1955 film by David Eady

- Theatrical poster
- Directed by: David Eady; George More O'Ferrall; Wendy Toye; Orson Welles (uncredited)
- Written by: Sidney Carroll; Ian Dalrymple; Donald B. Wilson
- Based on: Lord Mountdrago 1951 stories in Complete Short Stories by W. Somerset Maugham; You Killed Elizabeth 1951 stories in 20 Great Tales of Murder by Brett Halliday; In the Picture publication undetermined by Roderick Wilkinson
- Produced by: Ian Dalrymple; Alexander Paal
- Starring: Alan Badel; Orson Welles; John Gregson; André Morell
- Cinematography: Georges Périnal
- Edited by: Gerald Turney-Smith
- Music by: Doreen Carwithen
- Production company: Wessex Film Productions
- Distributed by: London Films
- Release dates: 15 March 1955 (US); May 1955 (UK)
- Running time: 99 minutes
- Country: United Kingdom
- Language: English
- Budget: £250,000

Three Cases of Murder is a 1955 British horror omnibus film comprising three stories: "In The Picture," "You Killed Elizabeth," and "Lord Mountdrago." Eamonn Andrews introduces each. Alan Badel appears in all three.

== Cast ==
=== Main cast ===
- Orson Welles as Lord Mountdrago ("Lord Mountdrago" segment)
- John Gregson as Edgar Curtain ("You Killed Elizabeth" segment)
- Elizabeth Sellars as Elizabeth ("You Killed Elizabeth" segment)
- Emrys Jones as George Wheeler ("You Killed Elizabeth" segment)
- Alan Badel as Owen (segment "Lord Mountdrago") / Mr. X (segment "In the Picture") / Harry (segment "You Killed Elizabeth")
- André Morell as Dr. Audlin ("Lord Mountdrago" segment)
- Hugh Pryse as Jarvis ("In the Picture" segment)
- Leueen MacGrath as Woman in the House ("In the Picture" segment)
- Eddie Byrne as Snyder ("In the Picture" segment)
- Helen Cherry as Lady Mountdrago ("Lord Mountdrago" segment)
- Eamonn Andrews, Introductions

=== Supporting cast ===
- Peter Burton as Under Secretary for Foreign Affairs (segment "Lord Mountdrago")
- Philip Dale as Sgt. Mallot (segment "You Killed Elizabeth")
- Christina Forrest as Susan (segment "You Killed Elizabeth")
- Evelyn Hall as Lady Connemara (segment "Lord Mountdrago")
- Ann Hanslip as The Girl (segment "In the Picture")
- David Horne as Sir James (segment "Lord Mountdrago")
- John Humphry as Private Secretary (segment "Lord Mountdrago")
- Maurice Kaufmann as Pemberton (segment "You Killed Elizabeth")
- Jack Lambert as Inspector Acheson ("You Killed Elizabeth" segment)
- Zena Marshall as Beautiful Blonde (segment "Lord Mountdrago")
- John Salew as Rooke ("In the Picture" segment)
- Harry Welchman as Connoisseur (segment "In the Picture")
- Colette Wilde as Jane (segment "You Killed Elizabeth")
- Arthur Wontner as Leader of the House (segment "Lord Mountdrago")

=== Uncredited/cameo cast ===
- Patrick Macnee as Guard Subaltern
- Marc Sheldon as Man in Background

== Production ==
The first and third stories deal with the supernatural. In the first, "In the Picture", a museum worker enters one of the pictures in a gallery, enticed by a mysterious man who turns out to be the picture's painter. In the second, "You Killed Elizabeth", a man falls in love with a woman, only to lose her to his friend; she dies, but which one killed her? In the third, "Lord Mountdrago", a dramatization of a short story by W. Somerset Maugham from his collection The Mixture as Before, a politician seeks revenge on the political opponent who humiliated him, by entering his dreams.

Wendy Toye directed "In the Picture"; David Eady, "You Killed Elizabeth"; and George More O'Ferrall, "Lord Mountdrago."

Orson Welles received top billing, but he appears only in "Lord Mountdrago". According to Patrick Macnee, who had a supporting role, Welles began making suggestions to director George More O'Ferrall throughout the first day of filming, and by the third day he had taken over the direction of the entire segment.

== Reception ==
The presence of Orson Welles in the cast meant the film was released in the US before the UK. The film was turned down for exhibition in the UK by both the Rank and Associated British chains. They claimed that the film was mediocre and that Welles was not a big enough box office draw to compensate for this.
