= The Sensorites =

007 – The Sensorites
- Doctor Who serial
- Two of the Sensorites as they appear in the serial. Critics praised their design and characterisation.

Cast
- Doctor: William Hartnell – First Doctor
- Companions: William Russell – Ian Chesterton; Jacqueline Hill – Barbara Wright; Carole Ann Ford – Susan Foreman
- Others: Stephen Dartnell – John; Ilona Rodgers – Carol; Lorne Cossette – Maitland; John Bailey – Commander; Martyn Huntley – First Human; Giles Phibbs – Second Human; Ken Tyllsen – First Sensorite / First Scientist; Joe Greig – Second Sensorite / Second Scientist / Warrior; Peter Glaze – Third Sensorite / City Administrator; Arthur Newall – Fourth Sensorite; Eric Francis – First Elder; Bartlett Mullins – Second Elder; Anthony Rogers, Gerry Martin – Sensorites

Production
- Directed by: Mervyn Pinfield (1–4); Frank Cox (5–6)
- Written by: Peter R. Newman
- Script editor: David Whitaker
- Produced by: Verity Lambert
- Music by: Norman Kay
- Production code: G
- Series: Season 1
- Running time: 6 episodes, 25 minutes each
- First broadcast: 20 June 1964
- Last broadcast: 1 August 1964

Chronology
← Preceded by The Aztecs	Followed by → The Reign of Terror

The Sensorites is the seventh serial of the British science fiction television series Doctor Who. Written by Peter R. Newman and directed by Mervyn Pinfield and Frank Cox, the serial was first broadcast on BBC1 in six weekly parts from 20 June to 1 August 1964. In the serial, the First Doctor (William Hartnell), his granddaughter Susan Foreman (Carole Ann Ford), and her teachers Ian Chesterton (William Russell) and Barbara Wright (Jacqueline Hill) visit a planet known as the Sense-Sphere to find the cure to a disease afflicting the alien race the Sensorites.

Newman's story for the serial was inspired by 1950s films set during World War II, exploring the notion of soldiers who continued to fight after the war. Pinfield was chosen to direct the first four episodes due to his directing style, while Cox directed the final two episodes. Designer Raymond Cusick avoided the use of right angles in his set designs, recalling Antoni Gaudí's work on the Sagrada Família. The serial premiered with 7.9 million viewers but failed to maintain these figures due to the holiday sports season. Retrospective response for the serial was generally positive, and it later received several print adaptations and home media releases.

== Plot ==
The TARDIS crew land on a spaceship, where they meet crew members Captain Maitland (Lorne Cossette) and Carol Richmond (Ilona Rodgers), who are on an exploration mission from Earth and are orbiting Sense-Sphere. However, its inhabitants, the Sensorites, refuse to let them leave orbit. The Sensorites visit and stop the travellers from leaving while sending them on a collision course, which the First Doctor (William Hartnell) diverts. The travellers then meet Carol's fiancé John (Stephen Dartnell), whose mind has been broken by the Sensorites. Susan Foreman's (Carole Ann Ford) telepathic mind is flooded with the many voices of the Sensorites who remain scared of the humans and are trying to communicate with her.

Meanwhile, the Doctor calculates that the Sensorites attacked the human craft because John, a mineralogist, had discovered a vast supply of molybdenum on Sense-Sphere. Susan reports that the Sensorites wish to make contact with travellers, asking the crew to board Sense-Sphere and reveal that a previous Earth expedition caused them great misery. The Doctor asks the Sensorites to return the TARDIS' lock in exchange for visiting the Sense-Sphere to speak with the leader; Ian Chesterton (William Russell), Susan, Carol, and John join him.

On their journey to Sense-Sphere, the party learns that the previous visitors from Earth exploited Sense-Sphere for its wealth; half of them stole the spacecraft, which exploded on take-off. The Sensorite Council is divided over the issue of inviting the party to Sense-Sphere: some members plot to kill them on arrival, but others believe that the humans can help with the disease that is currently killing many Sensorites. When their first plot is foiled by other Sensorites, they continue to plot in secret. John's mind is eventually unblocked. Ian contracts the disease that has blighted the Sensorites, and told that he will soon die; it is revealed that he was actually poisoned by drinking water from the aqueduct. The Doctor finds the aqueduct and creates a cure for Ian. The plotting Sensorites capture and then impersonate a Sensorite leader, the Second Elder (Bartlett Mullins).

Meanwhile, investigating the aqueduct, the Doctor finds strange noises and darkness. He sees and removes deadly nightshade, the cause of the poisoning, but while returning meets an unseen monster. Susan and Ian find him unconscious but unharmed. On recovering, he tells of his suspicion that some Sensorites are plotting to kill them. The plotting Sensorites kill the Second Elder and one of them replaces him in his position. John tells the others that he knows the lead plotter, but he is now too powerful, so the Doctor and Ian go down to the aqueduct to find the poisoners. Elsewhere, a mysterious assailant abducts Carol; Susan, John, and Barbara Wright (Jacqueline Hill) eventually find and release her. On discovering the tampered tools, they go into the aqueduct to rescue the Doctor and Ian. The leader discovers the plotters a little while later. Ian and the Doctor discover that the monsters were actually the survivors of the previous Earth mission, and they had been poisoning the Sensorites. Their deranged Commander (John Bailey) leads them to the surface, where they are arrested by the Sensorites. The Doctor and his party return to the city, pleading clemency for the poisoners. The leader of the Sensorites agrees and sends them back with Maitland, John, and Carol to Earth for treatment.

== Production ==
=== Writing and casting ===
Peter R. Newman developed the concept for The Sensorites in January 1964 and was officially commissioned to write the serial on 25 February by script editor David Whitaker. Newman's story was inspired by 1950s films set during World War II, exploring the notion of soldiers who continued to fight after the war. Mervyn Pinfield was chosen to direct the first four episodes, as it was felt that he could evoke great visual atmosphere despite a small budget, while Frank Cox directed the final two episodes.

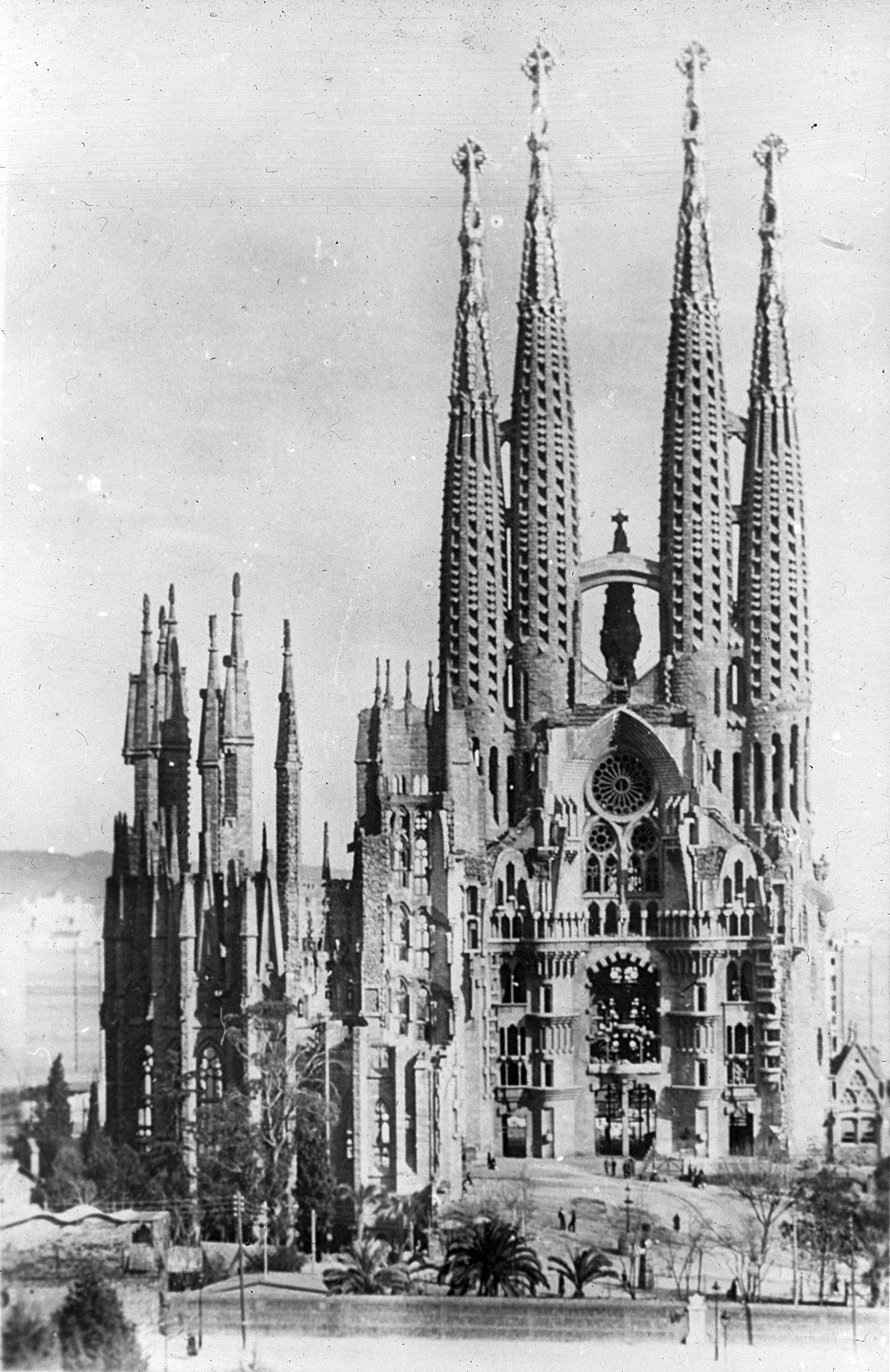
Designer Raymond Cusick was inspired by Antoni Gaudí's design of the Sagrada Família church (pictured in 1950) in Barcelona, which has no right angles.

Stephen Dartnell, who had previously appeared in The Keys of Marinus, was chosen to portray John, while Ilona Rodgers played his fiancée Carol. Canadian actor Lorne Cossette played Maitland, and John Bailey portrayed the Commander; Cox envisioned the Commander akin to Ben Gunn, a character from Robert Louis Stevenson's Treasure Island, and cast Bailey after seeing him in the play Pygmalion in April 1962. The other human survivors were played by Martyn Huntley and Giles Phibbs, friends from drama school who knew the director's secretary and were scheduled an interview.

=== Design and filming ===
Designer Raymond Cusick avoided the use of straight lines and right angles in his sets for the Sense Sphere, in deliberate contrast to the "alien" buildings of other stories. He recalled the work of architect Antoni Gaudí, who designed the Sagrada Família without using right angles. Cusick designed the spaceships sets to resemble the 1940s Dakota military aircraft. The Sensorite masks, created by costume designer Daphne Dare and make-up artist Jill Summers, were designed for short actors; Dare designed them to look like wise old men. Mouth flaps were concealed beneath the creatures' beards to allow the actors to speak. The Sensorites' feet were created by stretching out pieces of circular card at the end of the costume, making it difficult for the actors to walk. The hand tools used by the creatures were designed by Shawcraft Models.

Model filming for The Sensorites took place in May 1964 at Ealing Studios. Rehearsals for the first episode took place from 25 to 28 May, and weekly recording for the serial began on 29 May at the BBC Television Centre in Studio 3. To achieve the effect of the spaceship rolling on its axis, the camera was rocked erratically. The third and sixth episodes were recorded at Lime Grove Studios in Studio D and the fifth in Studio G, while the fourth was recorded at the Television Centre in Studio 4. Jacqueline Hill was absent from the recording of the fourth and fifth episodes as she was on holiday. A final insert shot of the spaceship was recorded at Lime Grove Studio D on 10 July 1964 by Henric Hirsch, director of the following episode.

== Reception ==
=== Broadcast and ratings ===
Episode	Title	Run time	Original release date	UK viewers (millions)	Appreciation Index
1	"Strangers in Space"	24:46	20 June 1964	7.9	59
2	"The Unwilling Warriors"	24:44	27 June 1964	6.9	59
3	"Hidden Danger"	24:53	11 July 1964	7.4	56
4	"A Race Against Death"	24:49	18 July 1964	5.5	60
5	"Kidnap"	25:47	25 July 1964	6.9	57
6	"A Desperate Venture"	24:29	1 August 1964	6.9	57

The first episode was broadcast on BBC1 on 20 June 1964 and was watched by 7.9 million viewers. The second episode aired 25 minutes late on 27 June due to an overrun of the previous programme Summer Grandstand, achieving 6.9 million viewers. While the third episode was provisionally scheduled to run two hours late on 4 July, due to extended coverage of the Wimbledon tennis championships and Ashes Test match, it was replaced by Juke Box Jury and postponed to the following week, receiving 7.4 million viewers. The fourth and fifth episodes dropped to 5.5 and 6.9 million viewers, respectively, but were nonetheless the highest-rated BBC show in the BBC North region for their respective weeks. The final episode aired on 1 August to 6.9 million viewers. The Appreciation Index was an average of 58 for the six episodes, ranging from 56 to 60. Episodes 3–5 were erased by the BBC on 17 August 1967, while the remaining three were erased on 31 January 1969. BBC Enterprises retained negatives of the original 16 mm film with soundtracks made in 1967; these were returned to the BBC Archives in 1978.

=== Critical response ===
Retrospective reviews of the serial were positive. In The Discontinuity Guide (1995), Paul Cornell, Martin Day, and Keith Topping wrote that "it veers from sinister to unintentionally hilarious, with everyone fluffing their lines". In The Television Companion (1998), David J. Howe and Stephen James Walker enjoyed the set-up of the first two episodes and the escalation of the threat, though noted that it contained a "classic piece of sixties sexism" in the traditional roles of Susan and Barbara; they praised the "bravura performance" of Dartnell, and felt that the characters of Maitland and Carol are "well defined". In A Critical History of Doctor Who (1999), John Kenneth Muir considered the Sensorites justified in their hatred of humans, appreciating that they "are not merely evil because the story demands it of them".

In 2008, Mark Braxton of Radio Times described the Sensorites as "a triumph of realisation, in their appearance ... and in their hierarchy, culture and customs" but felt they were developed to the detriment of the humans; Braxton praised the performance of Dartnell, Hartnell and Ford, noting the serial's importance to the relationship between the Doctor and Susan. In 2012, IGN's Arnold T. Blumburg wrote that "the story builds some nice suspense in the first two episodes and features some great set design and lighting", and commended the "shades of gray" used for the Sensorites' design, instead of the black and white creatures such as the Daleks. Nick Setchfield of SFX felt that the story was "ambitious" and the slow pace "actually works in episode one's favour", though the Sensorites' "chill-factor" was gone after the first episode. DVD Talk's John Sinnott considered the story "well constructed" with impressive set design and an expanded role for Susan, but felt that there was "nothing special" about the serial.

== Commercial releases ==
The Sensorites
- Author: Nigel Robinson
- Cover artist: Nick Spender
- Series: Doctor Who book: Target novelisations
- Release number: 118
- Publisher: Target Books
- Publication date: February 1987
- ISBN: 0-491-03455-5

A novelisation of this serial, written by Nigel Robinson was published as a hardback in February 1987 by Target Books; the paperback was released in May 1987. An audiobook reading of the novelisation, narrated by William Russell, was published by AudioGO in May 2012. Music from the serial was included as part of Doctor Who: 30 Years at the BBC Radiophonic Workshop in July 1993, Doctor Who at the BBC Radiophonic Workshop Volume 1: The Early Years 1963–1969 in May 2000, and The 50th Anniversary Collection in November 2014.

A restored version of the serial was released on VHS in November 2002 as part of The First Doctor Box Set, and separately on DVD in January 2012; the latter included several special features, including audio commentary and a documentary about Newman. The Sensorites was added to BBC iPlayer on 1 November 2023 alongside most other serials. The original television soundtracks were released by BBC Audio in July 2008, with Russell providing linking narration and an interview; this was later packaged as part of The TV Episodes: Collection Six box set in September 2013, featuring original camera scripts. Action figures of Sensorites were created by Fine Art Castins in 1985, Harlequin Miniatures in 1999–2000, and Eaglemoss in December 2015.

== Bibliography ==
- Howe, David J.; Stammers, Mark; Walker, Stephen James (1994). Doctor Who The Handbook – The First Doctor. London: Doctor Who Books. ISBN 0-426-20430-1.
- Cornell, Paul; Day, Martin; Topping, Keith (1995). The Discontinuity Guide. London: Virgin Books. ISBN 0-426-20442-5.
- Howe, David J.; Walker, Stephen James (1998). Doctor Who: The Television Companion: Volume 1 (2021 ed.). London: BBC Books. ISBN 978-1-845-83156-1.
- Muir, John Kenneth (1999). A Critical History of Doctor Who on Television. Jefferson, North Carolina: McFarland & Company. ISBN 978-0-786-40442-1.
- Wright, Mark, ed. (2016). "The Sensorites, The Reign of Terror and Planet of Giants". Doctor Who: The Complete History. 3 (21). London: Panini Comics, Hachette Partworks. ISSN 2057-6048.
