= Michael Carreras =

British film director and producer (1927–1994)

- Carreras in 1974
- Born: Michael Henry Carreras; 21 December 1927; London, England, UK
- Died: 19 April 1994 (aged 66); London, UK
- Occupations: Film producer; film director; screenwriter
- Organization(s): Hammer Film Productions; Capricorn Productions
- Spouse: Married
- Children: 3
- Parent: James Carreras (father)

Michael Henry Carreras (21 December 1927 – 19 April 1994) was a British film producer and director. He was known for his association with Hammer Films, being the son of founder James Carreras, and taking an executive role in the company during its most successful years.

As producer or executive producer, he worked on The Curse of Frankenstein (1957), Dracula (1958) and The Curse of the Werewolf (1960) and She (1965) among over sixty other films. He also wrote a smaller number of screenplays. He later turned to directing, with The Savage Guns / Tierra brutal (1961), Maniac (1963), The Curse of the Mummy's Tomb (1964), Slave Girls (1967), The Lost Continent (1968) and Shatter (1975) among others. In 1971, he took over directing Blood from the Mummy's Tomb after director Seth Holt died partway through filming.

Carreras died from cancer in London on 19 April 1994.

== Filmography ==
Producer

- The Dark Light (1951)
- Never Look Back (1952)
- Mantrap (1952)
- Spaceways (1953)
- Face the Music (1953)
- Blood Orange (1953)
- A Stranger Came Home (1954)
- The Men of Sherwood Forest (1954)
- Mask of Dust (1954)
- Break in the Circle (1954)
- Murder by Proxy (1954)
- Cyril Stapleton and the Show Band (documentary, 1955)
- The Right Person (1955)
- Just for You (documentary, 1955)
- Parade of the Bands (documentary, 1955)
- Copenhagen (documentary, 1956)
- Dick Turpin – Highwayman (1956)
- Quatermass 2 (1956)
- The Curse of Frankenstein (1957)
- The Steel Bayonet (1957)
- The Abominable Snowman (1957)
- The Camp on Blood Island (1957)
- Dracula (1957)
- The Snorkel (1958)
- The Revenge of Frankenstein (1958)
- Ten Seconds to Hell (1958)
- Yesterday's Enemy (1959)
- The Man Who Could Cheat Death (1959)
- The Mummy (1959)
- The Stranglers of Bombay (1959)
- Hell is a City (1959)
- The Two Faces of Dr. Jekyll (1960)
- The Brides of Dracula (1960)
- Sword of Sherwood Forest (1960)
- Taste of Fear (1960)
- Visa to Canton (1960)
- The Terror of the Tongs (1960)
- The Curse of the Werewolf (1961)
- The Pirates of Blood River (1961)
- Cash on Demand (1962)
- Maniac (1962)
- The Curse of the Mummy's Tomb (1963)
- Fanatic (1964)
- She (1965)
- One Million Years B.C. (1965, also writer)
- Slave Girls (1966, also director)
- The Mummy's Shroud (1967)
- The Lost Continent (1967)
- A Challenge for Robin Hood (1967)
- Moon Zero Two (1969)
- Crescendo (1969)
- Creatures the World Forgot (1970)
- Shatter (1970)
- Blood from the Mummy's Tomb (1971)
- Straight On Till Morning (1971)
- That's Your Funeral (1972)
- Demons of the Mind (1972)
- The Legend of the 7 Golden Vampires (1973)
- The Ghoul (1975)
- The Lady Vanishes (1979)

Director

- Cyril Stapleton and the Show Band (documentary, 1955)
- Just for You (documentary, 1955)
- Parade of the Bands (documentary, 1955)
- Copenhagen (documentary, 1956)
- The Steel Bayonet (1957)
- Visa to Canton (1960)
- Savage Guns (1961)
- Maniac (1962)
- The Curse of the Mummy's Tomb (1963)
- The Lost Continent (1967)
- Blood from the Mummy's Tomb (1971; co-director, replaced Seth Holt)
- Shatter (1975)
