= The Men of Sherwood Forest =

1954 film directed by Val Guest

Men of Sherwood Forest
- Directed by: Val Guest
- Written by: Allan MacKinnon
- Produced by: Michael Carreras
- Starring: Don Taylor; Reginald Beckwith; Eileen Moore; David King-Wood; Douglas Wilmer
- Cinematography: Walter J. Harvey
- Edited by: James Needs
- Music by: Doreen Carwithen
- Production company: Hammer Film Productions
- Distributed by: Exclusive Films
- Release date: 6 December 1954 (UK)
- Running time: 77 minutes
- Country: United Kingdom
- Language: English

Men of Sherwood Forest is a 1954 British swashbuckler film from Hammer Film Productions. It is directed by Val Guest and stars Don Taylor as Robin Hood, along with Reginald Beckwith, Eileen Moore, David King-Wood and Douglas Wilmer. It was written by Allan MacKinnon and the score was by Doreen Carwithen.

This was Hammer's first colour feature, and producer Michael Carreras was so pleased with it, he filmed Break in the Circle in colour as his next project. Hammer followed it up with three other Robin Hood films: Sword of Sherwood Forest (1960), A Challenge for Robin Hood (1967) and Wolfshead: The Legend of Robin Hood (1973).

== Plot ==
In 1194, on his return from the Third Crusade, Richard the Lionheart is taken prisoner in Germany. Disguised as a troubadour, Robin Hood builds a plan to rescue him from this tight spot but is captured. His Merry Men then have to fulfil a double mission: find Robin Hood and save the King.

== Cast ==
- Don Taylor as Robin Hood
- Reginald Beckwith as Friar Tuck
- Eileen Moore as Lady Alys
- David King-Wood as Sir Guy Belton
- Douglas Wilmer as Sir Nigel Saltire
- Harold Lang as Hubert
- Ballard Berkeley as Walter
- Patrick Holt as King Richard
- Wensley Pithey as Hugo
- Leslie Linder as Little John
- John Van Eyssen as Will Scarlett
- Leonard Sachs as Sheriff of Nottingham
- John Stuart as Moraine
- Raymond Rollett as Abbot St. Jude
- Toke Townley as Father David
- Vera Pearce as Elvira
- John Kerr as Brian of Eskdale
- Bernard Bresslaw as Garth
- Jocelyn Lane as Mary, serving girl
- Edward Hardwicke as Outlaw
- Jack May as Villager

== Production ==
Produced by Hammer Films, it was shot at the company's Bray Studios with sets designed by the art director J. Elder Wills. Exteriors were shot at Bodiam Castle in Sussex. Filming began in May 1954, the film was trade shown on 27 October and went on UK general release on 6 December 1954.

Val Guest called it "a merry romp, it was a send-up of all the Robin Hood things... It was a fun picture, but nothing really riveting or historical."

== Critical reception ==
The Monthly Film Bulletin wrote: "This unassuming addition to the Robin Hood saga is in the real Sherwood tradition. Don Taylor makes a good-natured Robin Hood, and the tone of the film generally is genial, although Friar Tuck's rollicking joviality is at times played up at the expense of the action."

David Parkinson noted in the Radio Times "a cheap and cheerful Hammer outing to Sherwood, with production values on a par with the infamously parsimonious ITV series starring Richard Greene", concluding "Val Guest directs with little feel for the boisterous action, but it's a tolerable frolic all the same."

TV Guide wrote that "this low-budget swashbuckler is good fun for the undiscriminating".

In British Sound Films: The Studio Years 1928–1959 (1984), David Quinlan rated the film as "good", writing: "Good romp, in even lighter vein than usual."

== See also ==
- List of films and television series featuring Robin Hood
