= Break in the Circle =

1955 British film by Val Guest

- British quad poster
- Directed by: Val Guest
- Written by: Val Guest
- Based on: the novel by Robin Estridge (writing as Philip Loraine)
- Produced by: Michael Carreras
- Starring: Forrest Tucker; Eva Bartok; Marius Goring; Eric Pohlmann; Arnold Marle
- Cinematography: Walter J. Harvey; Len Harris
- Edited by: Bill Lenny
- Music by: Doreen Carwithen; John Hollingsworth
- Production company: Hammer Film Productions
- Distributed by: Exclusive Films (UK); 20th Century-Fox (US)
- Release date: 28 February 1955 (UK)
- Running time: 91 minutes (UK); 69 minutes (US)
- Country: United Kingdom
- Language: English

Break in the Circle is a 1955 British crime film directed by Val Guest and starring Forrest Tucker, Eva Bartok, Marius Goring, Arnold Marlé and Guy Middleton. It was written by Guest based on the 1951 novel Break in The Circle by Robin Estridge (as Philip Loraine), and produced by Michael Carreras for Hammer Films. This was Hammer's second colour film, following Men of Sherwood Forest.

== Plot ==
Adventurer Skip Morgan and his friend Dusty hire out their boat, the Bonaventure, to do smuggling runs. German millionaire Baron Keller hires them to sneak a Polish scientist named Pal Kudnic out of Communist Europe to the West. Morgan learns that Keller is after a valuable fuel formula that Kudnic has developed, and he tells Keller he wants more money. Keller forces Morgan to take the boat out to sea where he intends to kill Morgan, but instead Morgan knocks Keller overboard to his death.

== Cast ==
- Forrest Tucker as Captain Skip Morgan
- Eva Bartok as Lisa, a British spy
- Marius Goring as Baron Keller
- Guy Middleton as Major Hobart
- Eric Pohlmann as Emile
- Arnold Marlé as Professor Pal Kudnic
- Fred Johnson as Chief Agent Farquarson
- David King-Wood as Colonel Patchway
- Reginald Beckwith as Dusty
- Guido Lorraine as Franz
- André Mikhelson as Russian thug
- Stanley Zevic as Russian thug
- Marne Maitland as henchman
- Arthur Lovegrove as Bert

== Production ==
It was the first feature produced by Michael Carreras and was shot on location in Polperro, London, and Hamburg.

Doreen Carwithen composed the score for the film, Jimmy Sangster was Production Manager, J. Elder Wills was Production Designer and Phil Leakey handled Makeup. Filming began 22 August 1954.

== Release ==
The film was trade shown on 10 February 1955 and released in the UK on 28 February 1955; it was released in the US in 1957.

== Reception ==
The Monthly Film Bulletin wrote: "Break in the Circle is a schoolboy adventure yarn, moving quite fast along heavily American-influenced lines. Occasionally, however, the profusion of bullets, fights and escapes strains the credibility necessary even to this type of entertainment. The characters are stock inventions and are played as such, and the dialogue (notably that of the hero) deals too freely in a stale wisecracking idiom. Efficient use is made of the location backgrounds, and the quality of the colour is good. A rousing romp for the unsophisticated."

Picturegoer wrote: "Eva Bartok is delightfully provocative as the heroine and Forrest Tucker is first-rate. But why wasn't Marius Goring, who plays the financier, given more scope."

Picture Show wrote: "Exciting drama of the rescue of an elderly scientist from Germany by a young man who lets nothing stand in' his way. Well acted and told."

Leslie Halliwell said: "Routine action yarn of cross and double-cross."

The Radio Times Guide to Films gave the film 2/5 stars, writing: "This is an efficient and energetic British thriller, not without the odd moment of humour."

In British Sound Films: The Studio Years 1928–1959 David Quinlan rated the film as "good", writing: "Robust thriller with a vein of humour."
