= James Needs =

British film editor

James Needs (17 October 1919 – 4 February 2003) was a British film editor associated with his work at Hammer Film Productions.

== Selected filmography ==
- Snowbound (1948)
- The Bad Lord Byron (1949)
- A Boy, a Girl and a Bike (1949)
- Room to Let (1950)
- A Case for PC 49 (1951)
- To Have and to Hold (1951)
- Whispering Smith Hits London (1952)
- Wings of Danger (1952)
- Lady in the Fog (1952)
- Girdle of Gold (1952)
- The Flanagan Boy (1953)
- The House Across the Lake (1954)
- The Men of Sherwood Forest (1954)
- The Glass Cage (1955)
- The Quatermass Xperiment (1955)
- X the Unknown (1956)
- The Curse of Frankenstein (1957)
- The Snorkel (1957)
- Quatermass 2 (1957)
- The Mummy (1959)
- A Weekend with Lulu (1961)
- The Witches (1966)
- Dr. Jekyll and Sister Hyde (1971)
