= Roy Plomley =

British radio broadcaster and writer (1914–1985)

Roy Plomley OBE
- Roy Plomley (at front) in the late 1930s, presenting Radio Normandy Calling from the stage of the Hippodrome, Eastbourne
- Born: 20 January 1914; Kingston upon Thames, Surrey, England
- Died: 28 May 1985 (aged 71); London, England
- Occupation: Radio presenter
- Years active: 1936–1985
- Known for: Creator and original host of Desert Island Discs
- Spouse: Diana Wong (m. 1940)
- Children: 1

Francis Roy Plomley (/ˈplʌmli/ PLUM-lee; 20 January 1914 – 28 May 1985) was an English radio broadcaster, producer, playwright and novelist. He is best remembered for creating the BBC Radio series Desert Island Discs, which he hosted from its inception in 1942 until his death in 1985.

== Early life ==
Plomley was born in Kingston upon Thames, Surrey, the only surviving child of pharmaceutical chemist Francis John Plomley (1868–1942) and Ellinor Maud (1880–1968; née Wigg). He was educated at King's College School, Wimbledon. On leaving school, he worked first briefly for an estate agent, then for a London advertising agency, and then in publishing.

His original aim was to be an actor, and he did secure very minor parts in a number of films, e.g. To the Public Danger (1948), Double Confession (1950), but he soon drifted into broadcasting, coming to public notice as an announcer, and later producer, for the International Broadcasting Company (IBC), starting on Radio Normandy in April 1936 and moving on at the end of that year to the IBC's Paris-based station, Poste Parisien.

Between mid-1937 and late 1939, he was involved in writing and production, travelling back and forth between these two IBC stations in France and the company's offices and studios in London, while also presenting the variety programme Radio Normandy Calling, recorded on location in theatres at UK seaside resorts and regularly beating the BBC in audience ratings.

== World War II ==
This part of his career came to an abrupt end when commercial broadcasting from the continent was brought to a halt by World War II. Plomley and his new wife, Diana Wong, whom he married earlier that year, stayed on in Paris, only narrowly escaping back to the UK via a circuitous route through the chaos and panic of the Fall of France, losing all their possessions in the process, as German occupying forces approached the French capital in June 1940.

== Desert Island Discs ==
In November 1941, Plomley devised the BBC Radio series Desert Island Discs. The idea spontaneously came to him one evening while at home, and he wrote to Leslie Perowne, who was in charge of popular record programmes. He had a favourable reply and so he set out his ideas with the names of personalities to be invited to participate. In those days of WWII every BBC Radio show was scripted by Plomley and submitted for censorship.

On 29 January 1942, the first of a series of eight weekly programmes was broadcast. Each show consisted of an interview with a celebrity, interspersed by the guest's choice of music. His contract was renewed for a further 15 shows. In the end he presented 1,791 editions of the programme stretching over 43 years. Its success was attributed to his skill as an interviewer and to his meticulous research.

Plomley was succeeded as presenter by Michael Parkinson (1986–1988), then by Sue Lawley (1988–2006), Kirsty Young (2006–2018) and most recently by Lauren Laverne. Desert Island Discs is the second longest-running radio programme in the world (after the Grand Ole Opry), and it is still running.

Until late September 2009, unlike many other BBC radio programmes, Desert Island Discs was unavailable for Listen Again on the BBC website. This was because when Roy Plomley devised the programme he was a freelance producer, and it had therefore been argued that the 'format rights' of the programme belonged to him rather than to the BBC. At his death, those 'rights' passed to his widow, and the BBC were subsequently unable to negotiate the right to include Desert Island Discs in their Listen Again offering. It was announced on 27 September 2009 that an agreement had been reached with the family as to payment of royalties and it would be available via iPlayer.

== Other work ==
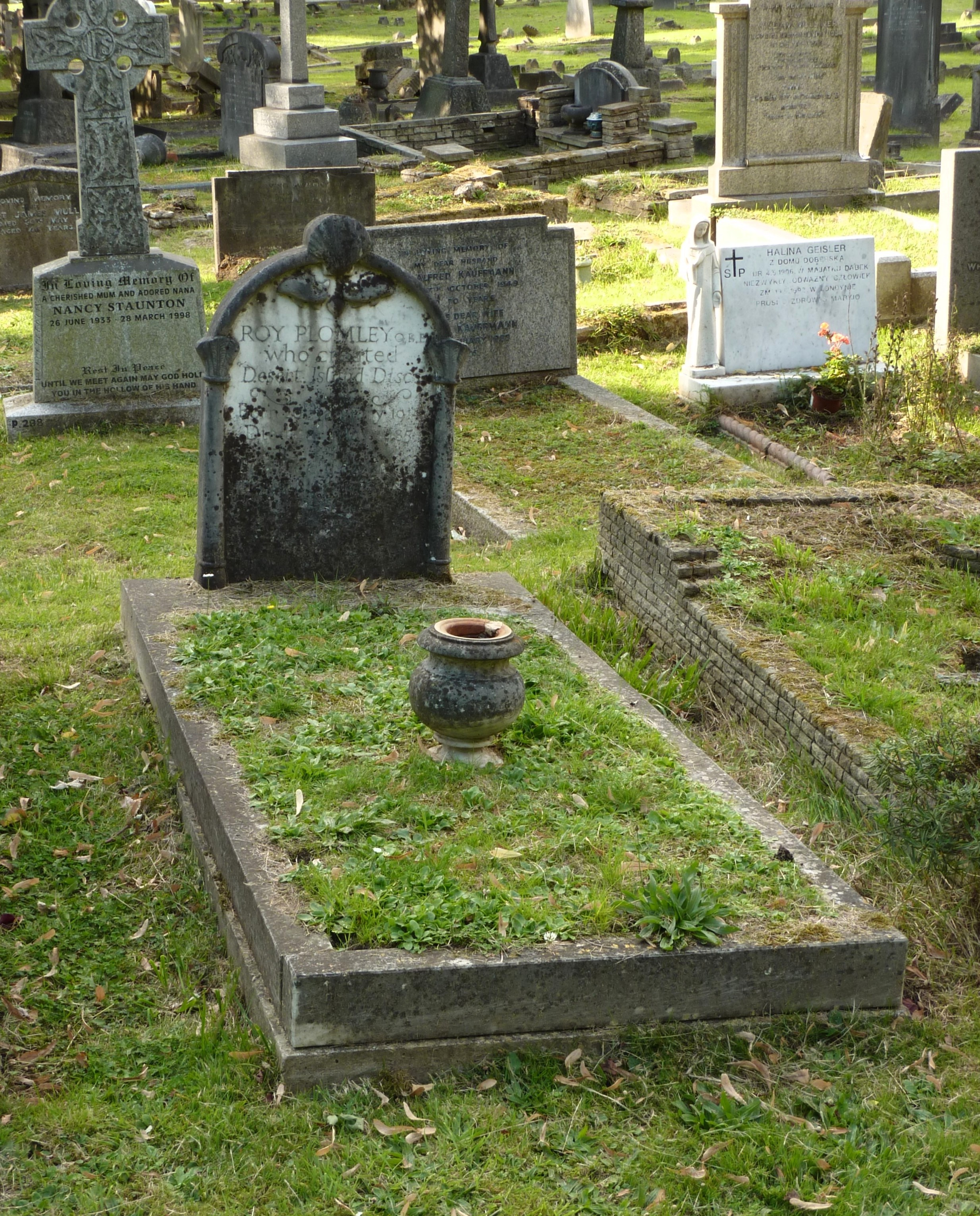
Plomley's grave at Putney Vale Cemetery, London in 2014

Plomley's broadcasting career was not restricted to Desert Island Discs; he also compiled and presented several feature programmes and was the chairman of BBC Radio's game show Many a Slip from 1964 to 1979, and a participant in such panel games as Does the Team Think?, also on BBC Radio. He anchored Round Britain Quiz in 1961. For television he produced Dinner Date with Death in 1949, claimed to be the first UK film made for TV, and in the same year chaired We Beg to Differ on BBC Radio, transferring with it to BBC Television in 1951. He also wrote the screenplay for the 1953 film The Blakes Slept Here.

Plomley was appointed OBE in 1975. He was chairman of the Radio and Television Writers' Association from 1957 to 1959, and was voted BBC Radio Personality of the Year in 1979. He published 16 stage plays (one of which, Cold Turkey, was put on in the West End), and one novel. He was posthumously inducted into the Radio Academy's Hall of Fame.

After a period of declining health, Plomley died from a heart attack at his home in Putney on 28 May 1985, at the age of 71; he was buried at Putney Vale Cemetery.
