= François Mackandal =

Haitian Maroon leader

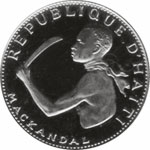
- Mackandal on a 20 gourde coin, 1968
- Born: c.1730 West or North Africa
- Died: January 20, 1758; Cap-Français, Haiti
- Cause of death: Death by burning
- Occupation: Maroon

François Mackandal (also known as Makandal or Macandal) (c. 1730- January 20, 1758) was a Haitian maroon and spiritual leader in the French colony of Saint-Domingue (present-day Haiti). He is sometimes described as a Haitian vodou priest, or houngan. However other historians say he was a bokor. Mackandal's birthplace is not definitively known, but historians have made attempts to find probable areas of origin. French colonial authorities accused him of joining the maroons to kill slave owners in Saint-Domingue and executed him by burning him to death. The scandal over his case was seen as a precursor to the Haitian Revolution.

His significance as a figure in the history of Haitian independence has been immortalized through Haitian currency.

The association of Mackandal with "black magic" is due to his Congo-inspired religious practices and reputation as a poisoner. Recent scholarship has disputed the idea that Mackandal ever used poison to kill.

== Speculated origins ==
Haitian historian Thomas Madiou states that Mackandal "had instruction and possessed the Arabic language very well." Early sources identify him as coming from the Atlas Mountains which span the Maghreb, but contemporary scholars such as Sylviane Diouf have speculated that he may have been from the modern day nations of Senegal, Mali, or Guinea. According to contemporary accounts of the time, during his interrogation he repeated the Arabic-language Shahada (Muslim testimony of faith) several times and even translated its meaning to his French captors during his interrogation before being condemned to death. By tracing the etymology of Mackandal's name, historian Kathryn de Luna suggests that he may have been from an area located closely to the coast of Cameroon.

== Biography ==
Mackandal was born in either Central or Western Africa and enslaved at a young age. "François" was a name he was referred to while enslaved. It is speculated that Mackandal lost his right arm in a farming accident when it was caught in a sugarcane press and crushed between the rollers.

When he was sent to work at a remote location, Mackandal was able to escape and live as a maroon beginning around 1748. While living as a maroon, Mackandal made and distributed magical protective bags of various ingredients to enslaved people. He held rituals for the maintenance and creation of the charms, which created a large religious community among enslaved people. According to C.L.R. James, Mackandal had the eloquence to a European orator, differing only in strength and vigor.

In 1758, the French, fearing that enslaved poisoners planned to kill all whites in the colony, tortured an enslaved woman named Assam, who also accused of poisoning, into naming dozens of people as co-conspirators. She claimed there was a large group of enslaved people who were poisoning their enslavers, which confirmed the fears of the French. Not long after Assam's confession, in 1758, Mackandal attended a celebration on a plantation, where someone told observing French men that there was a poisoner present. Mackandal was captured and reported to the French government.

After a case that lasted only a few days, Mackandal was burned at the stake in the center square of Port-au-Prince. He never confessed to poisoning. There are several reports that suggest that Mackandal was able to make a brief escape during his execution, but was recaptured and killed.

However, people from the crowd, particularly the black enslaved people, believed that Mackandal rose out of the flames and transformed into a winged beast that flew to safety, others believe he slipped from the ropes after the flames started and ran away and was never seen again. Most information on Mackandal is scarce.

Beyond the sketch of historical events outlined above, there is a colorful and varied range of myths about Mackandal. Various supernatural accounts of his execution, and of his escaping capture by the French authorities, are preserved in island folklore and widely depicted in paintings and popular art.

== Poisoning scandal ==
Around the time of Mackandal's capture and execution, there was a widespread panic among colonial enslavers that the enslaved people in Saint-Domingue were poisoning the white population in order to take over Saint-Domingue. The panic was largely caused by the statements of an enslaved man named Médor, who confessed to 'poisoning' the family who enslaved him. At the time, "poison" was a term used by Africans for any powerful substance that was influenced by magic, and was linked to practices of witchcraft.

Not long after Mackandal's death, doctors would speculate that the deaths were more likely caused by animals ingesting anthrax from the soil, then spreading the poison to humans through consumption, which caused people to fall ill after consuming the dead animals.

== Rumors about Mackandal ==
Due to the violent nature of how interrogations were conducted in Saint-Domingue and the unverified information that spread in popular media after Mackandal's death, there is a vast amount of factually questionable data that gets spread about the life of Mackandal, even by historians.

After Mackandal was executed, his case was widely publicized as evidence of discontent among enslaved people, which enslavers were already concerned with. As stories were spread in magazines, there were many fantastical features added on to Mackandal's story. Unverifiable sources claimed that Mackandal sought a genocide of whites in Saint-Domingue, indiscriminately slaughtered people, planned a revolution, and was the leader of a massive maroon band who planned to take over Hispaniola.

According to some popular narratives, Mackandal created poisons from island herbs. He distributed the poison to enslaved people, who added it to the meals and refreshments they served the French plantation owners and planters. He became a charismatic guerrilla leader who united the different maroon bands and created a network of secret organizations connected with enslaved people still on plantations. He led maroons to raid plantations at night, torch property and kill the enslavers.

== In popular culture ==
One of the most well-known portraits of Mackandal is that in Alejo Carpentier's magical realist novel The Kingdom of this World.

Mackandal's public torture and execution (via burning at the stake) is depicted vividly in Guy Endore's 1934 novel Babouk. Both Mackandal's rebel conspiracy and his brutal killing are shown as influential on Babouk (based on Boukman), who helps to lead a 1791 slave revolt.

A fictionalized version of Mackandal appears in Agatha Christie's book The Pale Horse, which talks about murder with occult means.

A fictionalized version of Mackandal also appears in Nalo Hopkinson's novel The Salt Roads and in Mikelson Toussaint-Fils's novel Bloody trails: the Messiah of the islands (in French, Les sentiers rouges: Le Messie des iles).

In Neil Gaiman's novel American Gods, a boy named Agasu is enslaved in Africa and brought to Haiti, where he eventually loses his arm and leads a rebellion against the European establishment. This account is very similar to Mackandal's.

C G S Millworth's novel Makandal's Legacy tells of Mackandal's fictional son, Jericho, and the gift of immortality he received as a result of his father's pact with the voodoo spirits, the lwa.

The Harvard ethnobotanist and Anthropologist Wade Davis writes about Francois Mackandal in his novel "The Serpent and the Rainbow." In the chapter "Tell my Horse" Davis explores the historical beginnings of vodoun culture and speculates Mackandal as a chief propagator of the Vodoun religion.

In the video game Assassin's Creed III: Liberation, the character Agaté mentions François Mackandal as having been his Assassin mentor, and also recalls how Mackandal was burned at stake following his failed attempt to poison the colonists of Saint-Domingue. The game portrays a false Mackandal who is actually another character called Baptiste, who according to Agaté was once a brother and was also trained by the real Mackandal, but betrayed the Assassins following his death. The character uses a Skull face painting and is missing his left arm, which he amputated to impersonate his mentor, although the real Mackandal lost his right arm. Mackandal is also mentioned the prequel game Assassin's Creed Rogue as the Mentor of the Saint-Domingue Brotherhood of Assassins, who was indirectly responsible for the 1751 Port-au-Prince earthquake.

== See also ==
- Dutty Boukman
- Toussaint Louverture
