= Curse of the Werewolf =

Curse of the Werewolf may refer to

- The Curse of the Werewolf, a 1961 British horror film
- Curse of the Werewolf (Universal Epic Universe), a roller coaster
