= Kennis =

Kennis is a surname. Notable people with the surname include:

- Dan Kennis (1917–2006), American movie producer
- Gregor Kennis (born 1974), English cricketer

== See also ==
- Kennis Music, record label
