= Carroll Borland =

American actress (1914–1994)

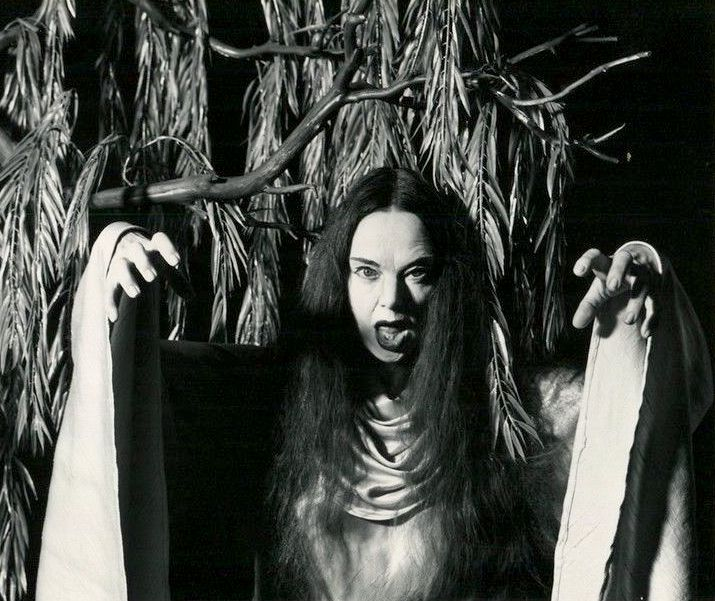
- Borland in 1966 recreating her appearance in Mark of the Vampire
- Born: February 25, 1914; Fresno, California, U.S.
- Died: February 3, 1994 (aged 79); Arlington, Virginia, U.S.
- Occupations: Actress; professor; writer
- Spouse: Vernon J. Parten (m. 1937)
- Children: 1

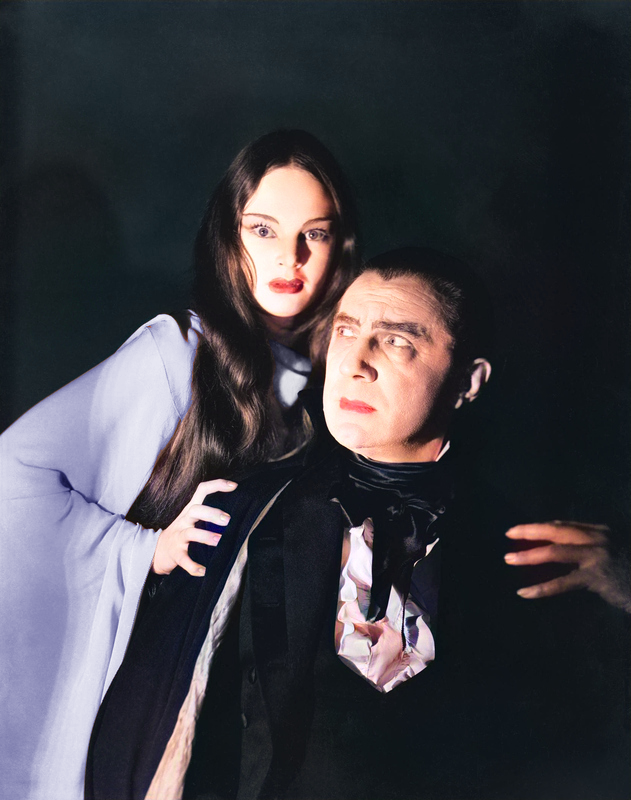
Colorized publicity shot taken with Bela Lugosi on the set of Mark of the Vampire (MGM, 1935)

Carroll Borland (February 25, 1914 – February 3, 1994) better known by the stage-spelling Carol Borland, was an American professor, writer, and actress. She is best known for having portrayed Luna, the daughter of Bela Lugosi's character, Count Mora, in Mark of the Vampire, and for creating the iconic look of the female vampire with her waist-length dark hair and Adrian-designed shroud in this film.

== Biography ==
Borland was born February 25, 1914, in Fresno, California. (Note: Some sources state Borland was born in San Francisco, but biography Gregory William Mank notes that she was born in Fresno, California. This is consistent with the records published by the California Birth Index, which list Carroll Borland's birthdate as February 25, 1914, in Fresno County.) She was raised in Alameda, California, where she studied ballet in her early childhood.

Borland was a drama student at the University of California, Berkeley at the time she took the role of Luna in Mark of the Vampire (1935). She had previously appeared in a stage production of Dracula with Lugosi, in the role of Lucy.

Borland got the attention of Lugosi—and a part in the play—by writing to him and suggesting that Dracula did not die at the end of the novel, but rather turned to dust just as the sun was setting. However, she was known to exaggerate the closeness of Lugosi's paternal relationship to her; in Richard Bojarski's The Films of Bela Lugosi, she describes his funeral as if she had been there, and claims to have been, though she was not actually in attendance.

Borland retired from acting in 1953, though her other screen appearances were limited to a short film in 1933 and an unbilled appearance in the 1936 serial Flash Gordon, until Fred Olen Ray cast her in his films Scalps (1983) and Biohazard (1985).

Her novel, Countess Dracula, was published by Magicimage Filmbooks in March 1994, one month after her death.

== Death ==
Borland, suffering from diabetes and other health issues in her later life, relocated from her home in the Napa Valley to Arlington, Virginia, to be closer to her daughter. Borland resided in a retirement community there, where she died on February 3, 1994, of pneumonia. She was cremated, and her ashes were scattered in the San Francisco Bay by her daughter.

== Filmography ==
| Year | Title | Role | Notes |
|---|---|---|---|
| 1935 | Mark of the Vampire | Luna | |
| 1936 | Flash Gordon | Woman in Ming's Palace | Uncredited |
| 1983 | Scalps | Dr. Sharon Reynolds | |
| 1985 | Biohazard | Rula Murphy | (final film role) |

== Sources ==
- Bojarski, Richard (1980). The Films of Bela Lugosi. Secaucus, New Jersey: Citadel Press. ISBN 978-0-806-50716-3.
- Lennig, Arthur (2003). The Immortal Count: The Life and Films of Bela Lugosi. Lexington, Kentucky: University Press of Kentucky. ISBN 978-0-813-14375-0.
- Lentz, Harris (1994). Obituaries in the Performing Arts. Jefferson, North Carolina: McFarland. ISBN 978-0-786-40254-0.
- Mank, Gregory William (2010). Hollywood Cauldron: Thirteen Horror Films from the Genre's Golden Age. Jefferson, North Carolina: McFarland. ISBN 978-0-786-46255-1.
- Mank, Gregory William (2015). Women in Horror Films, 1930s. Jefferson, North Carolina: McFarland. ISBN 978-1-476-60954-6.
