= Emma (1932 film) =

1932 film

- Theatrical poster
- Directed by: Clarence Brown
- Screenplay by: Leonard Praskins
- Story by: Frances Marion
- Produced by: Clarence Brown; Harry Rapf
- Starring: Marie Dressler; Richard Cromwell; Jean Hersholt; Myrna Loy
- Cinematography: Oliver T. Marsh
- Edited by: William LeVanway
- Distributed by: Metro-Goldwyn-Mayer
- Release date: January 2, 1932 (United States)
- Running time: 72 minutes
- Country: United States
- Language: English
- Budget: $350,000
- Box office: $1,972,000

Emma is a 1932 American pre-Code comedy-drama film released by Metro-Goldwyn-Mayer, starring Marie Dressler, written by Leonard Praskins from a story by Frances Marion, and directed by Clarence Brown. The supporting cast features Richard Cromwell, Jean Hersholt and Myrna Loy. The film's copyright was registered in 1932 and renewed in 1959. It will enter the American public domain on January 1, 2028. (Note: Under R229941)

== Plot ==
Inventor Frederick Smith's wife dies during the birth of their fourth baby, Ronnie, leaving the family in the care of their faithful housekeeper Emma. Twenty years later, after Smith's inventions have made the family rich, the affable Ronnie, who is Emma's favorite, arrives home from college, announcing that he wants to quit school and become a pilot. The other Smith children, Bill, Gypsy and Isabelle, have all grown into spoiled adults, but Emma lovingly indulges them all, making excuses for their bad behavior to their father and everyone else.

As Emma leaves for her first vacation in 32 years with the family, the absent-minded Frederick sadly takes her to the station. She gets cold feet and decides to stay home, but Frederick won't let her and decides to go along with her to Niagara Falls. Waiting for their train, Frederick proposes and Emma accepts, even though she is afraid that people will talk. When the children learn about the marriage, Ronnie is happy for them, but the other children are embarrassed by the blot on their social record. On their honeymoon, as the happy Frederick and Emma row on the lake, they are teased by some young vacationers, prompting Frederick to take the oars from Emma. The exertion causes a mild heart attack and they return home. As the contented Frederick listens to Emma sing to him, he dies, and a short time later, the family learns that he has left his entire estate to Emma.

Though Emma wants to give the money back to the children, all of them except Ronnie turn on her and threaten to prove that their father was crazy when he wrote the will. Emma throws them out and awaits the lawsuit they threaten while the loyal Ronnie goes to Canada for a flying assignment. Because the will cannot be broken, the children go to the district attorney to have him bring murder charges against Emma, using distorted testimony by Mathilda, the maid. When Ronnie hears about the trial, he desperately flies East to help Emma but is killed while flying through a dangerous storm.

Even though her life is in peril, she won't allow her kind attorney Haskins to defame the character or motives of the children. Her emotional plea for them in court results in her acquittal, but Emma's relief is ruined when she learns of Ronnie's death. A short time later, Emma gives all of the money to the children, telling Haskins that she hopes that now they will think better of her. After she sadly views Ronnie's body, Isabell, Bill and Gypsy beg her forgiveness and want her to stay with them, but she refuses, saying that her work with them is finished, but no matter what happens or where they all are, they will still belong to each other.

At a new position, Emma happily attends a doctor's large family and is pleased when the wife agrees to name her new baby Ronnie at Emma's request.

== Cast ==
- Marie Dressler as Emma Thatcher Smith
- Richard Cromwell as Ronald 'Ronnie' Smith
- Jean Hersholt as Frederick 'Fred' Smith
- Myrna Loy as Countess Isabelle 'Izzy' Smith Marlin
- John Miljan as District Attorney
- Purnell Pratt as Haskins, the Lawyer
- Leila Bennett as Matilda, the Maid
- Barbara Kent as Gypsy Smith
- Kathryn Crawford as Sue Smith
- George Meeker as Bill Smith
- Anne Shirley as young Isabelle
- Dale Fuller as Maid at Hotel
- Wilfred Noy as Drake, the First Butler
- André Cheron as Count Pierre
- Wade Boteler as Airport Official (uncredited)
- Edward LeSaint as Druggist (uncredited)
- Dorothy Peterson as Mrs. Winthrop (uncredited)

== Reception ==
=== Critical ===
Contemporary reviews were largely positive, especially in their appraisals of Marie Dressler's performance. Mordaunt Hall of the The New York Times considered the film to be "sentimental and somewhat implausible at times", but praised Dressler, writing that she "contributes another sterling portrayal, possibly her best" and "Miss Dressler's impersonation is one of the finest character studies that has come to the screen." His comments about the supporting cast were positive: "Mr. Hersholt is splendid as Frederick Smith ... Richard Cromwell ... is capable and sympathetic as Ronnie. Myrna Loy, John Miljan and Kathryn Crawford make the most of their respective rôles."

The Film Daily gave a positive review, and wrote that the film showed "Marie Dressler at her best." They continued, "This human story is an ace tear-jerker in which many hearty laughs are intermingled. Director Clarence Brown has handled the production with force and feeling, and with a fine supporting cast, headed by Jean Hersholt, has turned out a real box-office attraction."

More recently, Leonard Maltin wrote, "Dressler is at her best ... Sentimental movie never cloys, thanks to wonderful Marie."

=== Accolades ===
Marie Dressler was nominated as Best Actress at the 5th Academy Awards where Helen Hayes in The Sin of Madelon Claudet emerged victorious. Dressler had won the award the year before with Min and Bill.

=== Box office ===
The film grossed a total (domestic and foreign) of $1,972,000: $1,409,000 from the US and Canada and $563,000 elsewhere. It made a profit of $898,000.
