= Henry Wadsworth (actor) =

American actor (1903–1974)

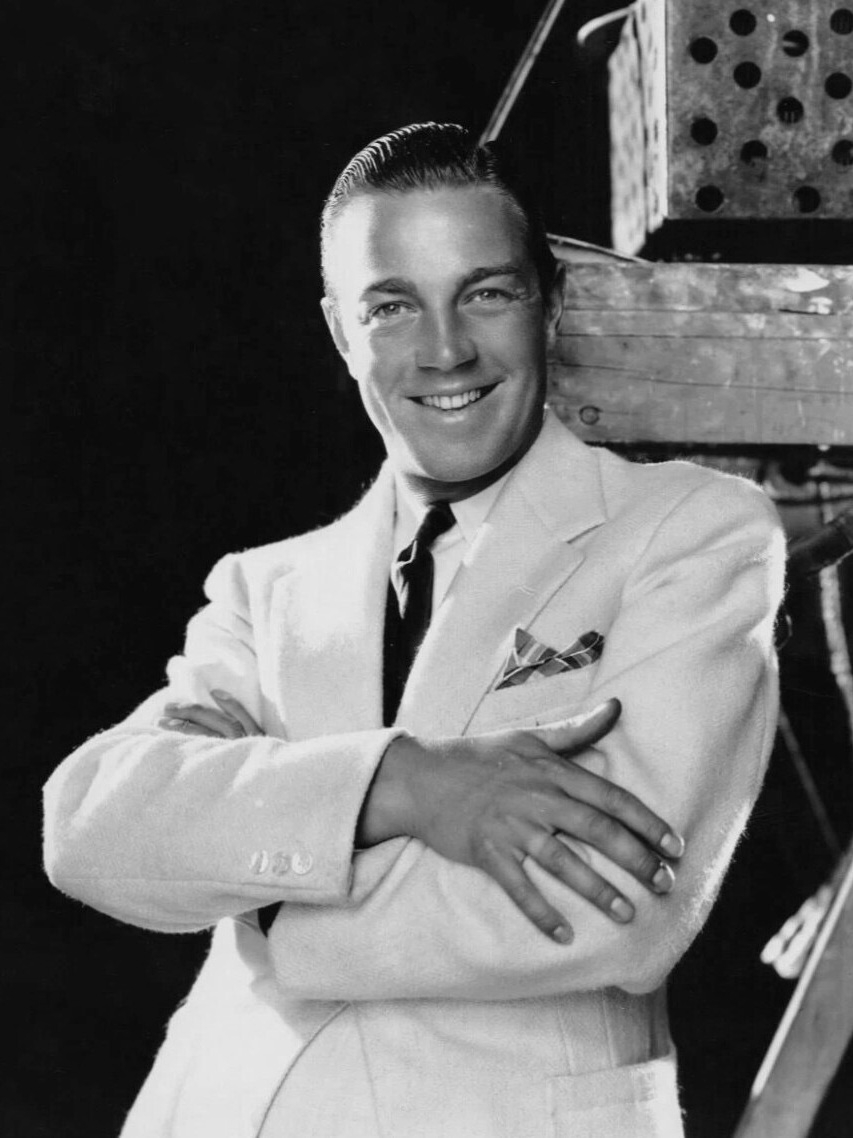
- Wadsworth, c. 1934
- Born: June 18, 1903
- Died: December 5, 1974 (aged 71); New York City, U.S.
- Resting place: Maysville Cemetery
- Occupation: Actor
- Years active: 1927–1952

Henry Wadsworth (June 18, 1903 – December 5, 1974) was an American actor best known for appearing in Applause (1929), The Thin Man (1934), and Mark of the Vampire (1935).

== Early life ==
Joseph Henry Wadsworth was born on June 18, 1903, to John Gray Wadsworth and Ida Power Wadsworth, who were married in 1894. Henry Wadsworth's ancestors first arrived in Hartford, Connecticut from England in 1632. He was the grandson of William Henry Wadsworth, who was a well-known lawyer, orator, and congressman.

Wadsworth attended the University of Kentucky after graduating from Maysville High School in 1921.

He enrolled in Carnegie Institute of Technology's drama school before starting his acting career.

== Career ==
Wadsworth made his first appearance in film in the title role of Howard Lindsay's Tommy in late 1927, following which he went on to appear in films like Applause, made under Paramount production. The film also marked Helen Morgan's debut.

He played minor roles in Operator 13 (alongside Marion Davies) and in Fast and Loose before having a supporting role in W.S. Van Dyke's The Thin Man. He also appeared in The Voice of Bugle Ann, This Side of Heaven, All-Legit Cast, Mark of the Vampire, Sitting on the Moon, and Dr. Kildare Goes Home.

Wadsworth was cast in The Big Broadcast series' The Big Broadcast of 1936.

He joined the US Navy during World War II and served for two and a half years.

He retired from acting in the late 1950s; his last appearance was in Rodgers and Hammerstein's The Happy Time alongside Leora Dana and Eva Gabor.

== Death ==
Wadsworth died on December 5, 1974, at St. Luke's Hospital, New York City, at the age of 71. He is interred in Maysville Cemetery in Maysville, Kentucky.

== Filmography ==
Year	Title	Role	Notes
1929	Applause	Tony	
1930	Slightly Scarlet	Sandy Weyman	
1930	Fast and Loose	Bertie Lenox	
1933	Luxury Liner	Fritz	
1933	Soldiers of the Storm	Dodie	
1933	Hold the Press	Frankie White	
1934	This Side of Heaven	Hal	
1934	The Show-Off	Joe Fisher	
1934	The Thin Man	Tommy	
1934	Operator 13	John Pelham	
1934	Dangerous Corner	Gordon Whitehouse	
1934	Evelyn Prentice	Chester Wylie	
1935	West Point of the Air	Lieutenant Pettis	
1935	Mark of the Vampire	Fedor Vincente	
1935	The Big Broadcast of 1936	Smiley	
1936	Ceiling Zero	Tay Lawson	
1936	The Voice of Bugle Ann	Bake Royster	
1936	Sitting on the Moon	Charlie Lane	
1938	Doctor Rhythm	Otis Eaton (The Drunk)	
1940	Dr. Kildare Goes Home	Collins	
1943	Silver Skates	Tom	
1945	Secret Agent X-9	Jack Roberts	Serial, Uncredited, (final film role)
