= Zita Johann =

Austrian-American actress (1904–1993)

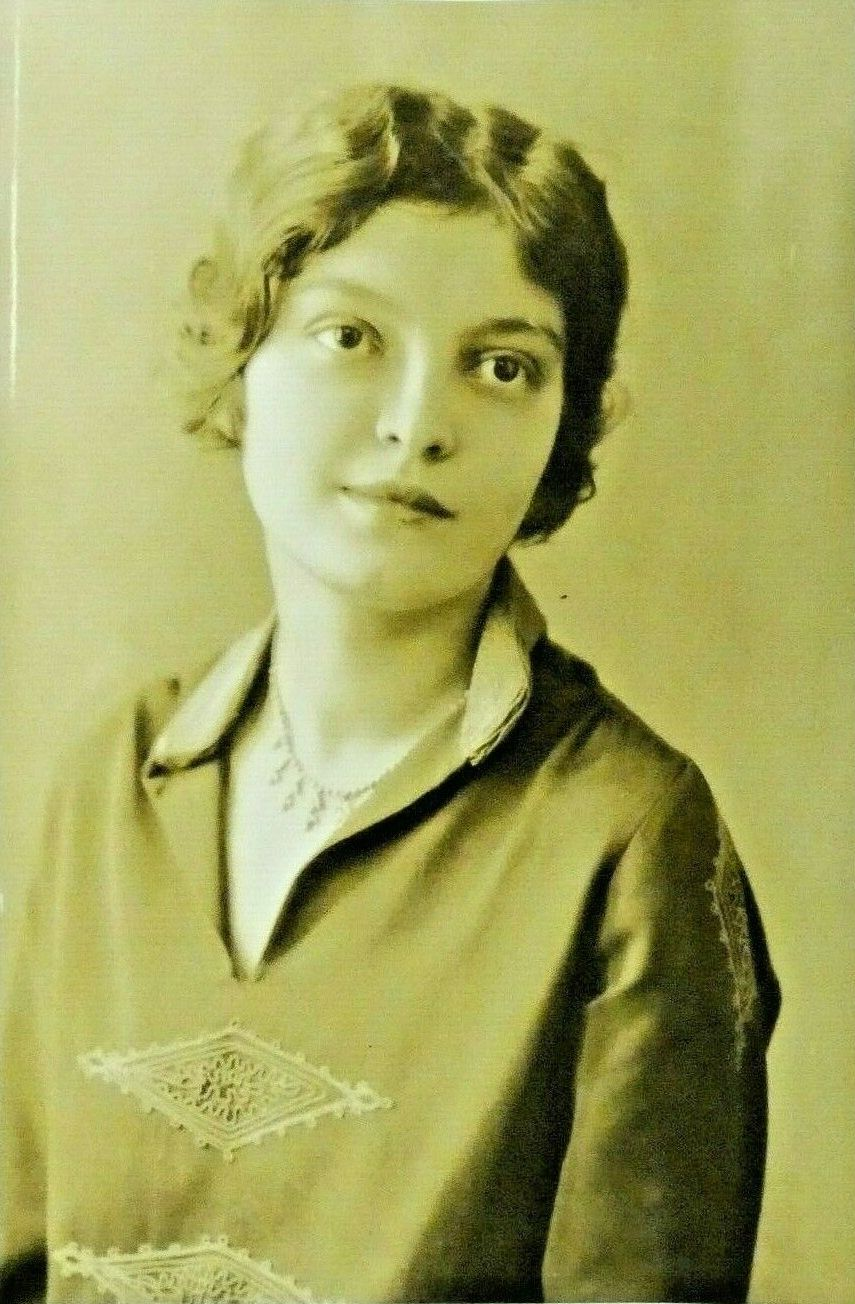
- Zita Johann in 1927
- Born: Elizabeth Johann; 14 July 1904; Deutschbentschek (near Temesvar), Austria-Hungary, (now Romania)
- Died: 24 September 1993 (aged 89); Nyack, New York, U.S.
- Occupations: Actress, writer
- Years active: 1923–1986
- Spouses: John Houseman (m. 1929; div. 1933) John McCormick (m. 1935; div. 1938) Bernard E. Shedd (m. 1941, divorced)

Zita Johann (born Elizabeth Johann) (14 July 1904 – 24 September 1993) was an Austrian-American actress and writer. She is best known for her role in Karl Freund's film The Mummy (1932) starring Boris Karloff.

== Early life ==
A German-speaking Banat Swabian, Zita Johann was born Elizabeth Johann in the village of Deutschbentschek (near Timișoara), Austria-Hungary. The village is now part of Romania. Johann left her home and moved to the U.S. when she was about 7 years old. Her father, a hussar officer named Stefan Johann, emigrated with his family to the United States in 1911.

In high school, Johann began to act in school plays. Later, she appeared with the Theatre Guild Repertory Company in touring productions of Peer Gynt, The Devil's Disciple and He Who Gets Slapped.

== Career ==
Johann debuted on Broadway in 1924. She turned down the lead in Universal's 1929 theatrical version of Show Boat, so she could star in the play Machinal with a young Clark Gable. She subsequently signed a contract with MGM to act in films. Her contract was unique at the time in that it had a script approval clause, an indication of how much the studio had wanted to sign her. She took full advantage of the clause and turned down most scripts she was offered. She was said to have once asked Irving Thalberg why he made such awful pictures. About six months later, she asked to be released from her contract.

Johann made her first film appearance in D. W. Griffith's 1931 film The Struggle. Johann had been a great admirer of Griffith and was delighted to star in the film, which was inspired in part by his own struggle with alcoholism. The film was not a success. The next year, Johann starred in her most famous film, The Mummy (1932), with Boris Karloff. It seemed like a perfect role for her because of her beliefs in reincarnation and mysticism. However, the director, Karl Freund, was hostile to her on set. He forced her to film a (later deleted) scene while unprotected from lions, and tried to get her to film a semi-nude scene. Johann asserted Freund set her up as a scapegoat in case his directorial debut was unsuccessful.

Johann went on to make other films and was also known for her performances in The Sin of Nora Moran (1933) and Luxury Liner (1933). None were as successful as The Mummy. Nonetheless, her great love was the theater and she did not like Hollywood. She felt exploited by the studio moguls who viewed actors as commodities, and she didn't like being on camera which she felt was a barrier between her and the audience. By contrast, in the theater, she had more rehearsal time, felt less rushed and was less exhausted at the end of the day. In her New York Post obituary in 1993, she was quoted as having said: "I hated Hollywood. It was no more than a personality and sex factory. They weren't interested in acting." In her obituary in The Independent, she was quoted as having described the dehumanizing Hollywood system: "The moguls created stars and sold them to the public, the way a grocer sold a 39-cent can of tomatoes to his shoppers."

When the studio tried to make Johann appear in Thirteen Women, which she considered a tawdry melodrama, she asked RKO to be released from her contract. After seven films, she quit to work in theatre again, collaborating with John Houseman, to whom she was married at the time, and with Orson Welles. From the 1920s through the early 1940s, Johann appeared in a number of Broadway productions including: Dawn (1924) at the Sam H. Harris Theatre, The Goat Song (1926) at The Theatre Guild, Machinal (1928) at the Plymouth Theatre, Troyka (1930) at the Hudson Theatre, Uncle Vanya (1930) at the Booth Theatre, Tomorrow and Tomorrow (1931) at the Henry Miller's Theatre, Seven Keys To Baldpate (1935) at the National Theatre, The Burning Deck (1940) at the Maxine Elliott's Theatre and Broken Journey (1942) at the Henry Miller's Theatre.

In addition to her career as an actress, Johann was also a writer. She wrote plays and film scripts under the pseudonyms Joan Wolfe and Elizabeth Yorke. Under the pen name, Joan Wolfe, she wrote the scripts Emily's Week and The Raw Deal. Johann later spent a lot of time doing community work and taught acting classes for children out of her home. In the 1970s she filmed a show called Zita and Her Friends, which was aimed at helping parents and children have better communication and stronger relationships. She also taught acting to people with learning disorders.

In 1962, Johann was a guest artist at Elmwood Playhouse in Nyack, New York, where she directed Don Juan In Hell. She made her last film appearance in the 1986 horror film Raiders of the Living Dead.

== Personal life ==
Johann was a spiritual person who prayed before each performance. In an act reminiscent of the Roman orators before political speeches, she would call upon the spirits of the people she was to portray to ask that they inspire her work. Johann described herself as a "mystic" and claimed to have levitated. She described her process before a play: "to me, the theatre was related to the spirit. Before every performance I sat alone in my dressing-room, said my prayers, died unto myself and became my character."

Johann married three times. She married John Houseman on October 5, 1929. Houseman (né Jacques Haussmann) had been born in Bucharest, about 300 miles from where Johann had been born. When the couple married, Houseman was a grain dealer like his father Georges Haussmann but his business career was wiped out by the Wall Street crash just weeks after the wedding. It was Johann's idea that Houseman should reinvent himself as an actor, following her lead in the theater. During her film career, they lived in Malibu, where Johann enjoyed painting, reading and playing violin. The couple divorced in Mexico on 13 September 1933.

Johann briefly dated John Huston. In February 1933 she suffered injuries after a car accident where he had been driving drunk. Johann went through the windshield of Huston's car. A little over six months later, Huston was involved in another car accident, which killed dancer Tosca Roulien. After an only seven day courtship, Johann married retired film producer, John McCormick, on 9 July 1935. McCormick proved to be controlling and an alcoholic. They divorced on 18 August 1938.

During World War II, Johann raised money for war-related charities, and organized performances for American soldiers. At her third wedding money was raised for Finnish war orphans. For her third marriage, Johann wanted to find someone who was completely out of the industry, so she married Bernard Shedd (Schetnitz), an economist and publisher. The relationship began when he was in the military and stationed in California. After the marriage, she found out he did not have much money and was not motivated to contribute much to their marriage. They married on April 18, 1941 and divorced in the 1950s.

During her marriage to Shedd, Johann moved back to New York and bought a home in Rockland County, which is part of the New York City metropolitan area. Johann lived there for decades. She never remarried or had children, but devoted her life towards community and charity. Johann died from pneumonia at a hospital in Nyack, New York, on 24 September 1993, at the age of 89. She was cremated and her ashes were scattered in a stream on a family farm in Upstate New York.

== Theatre credits ==
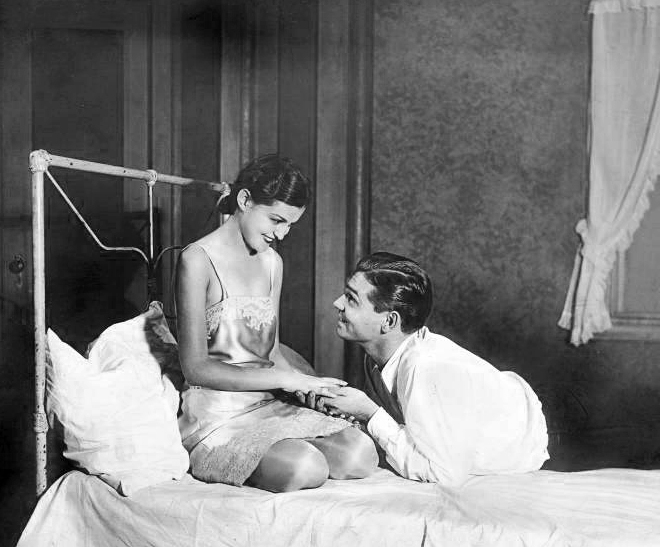
Zita Johann and Clark Gable in Machinal (1928)

Date	Title	Role	Notes
14 April – June 1924	Man and the Masses	First Woman Prisoner	Garrick Theatre, New York
24 November 1924 – January 1925	Dawn	Judith	Sam H. Harris Theatre, New York
18 June – 29 November 1925	Grand Street Follies	Performer	Neighborhood Playhouse, New York
25 January – March 1926	The Goat Song	Kruna	Guild Theatre, New York
7 September – 24 November 1928	Machinal	A Young Woman	Plymouth Theatre, New York
1–1 April 1930	Troyka	Natascha	Hudson Theatre, New York
22 September – October 1930	Uncle Vanya	Sofya Alexandrovna	Booth Theatre, New York
13 January – July 1931	Tomorrow and Tomorrow	Eve Redman	Henry Miller's Theatre, New York
14–16 March 1935	Panic	Ione	Imperial Theatre, New York
27 May – June 1935	Seven Keys to Baldpate	Mary Norton	National Theatre, New York
1–2 March 1940	The Burning Deck	Nina Brandt	Maxine Elliott Theatre, New York
23 June – July 1942	Broken Journey	Rachel Thatcher Arlen	Henry Miller's Theatre, New York

== Filmography ==
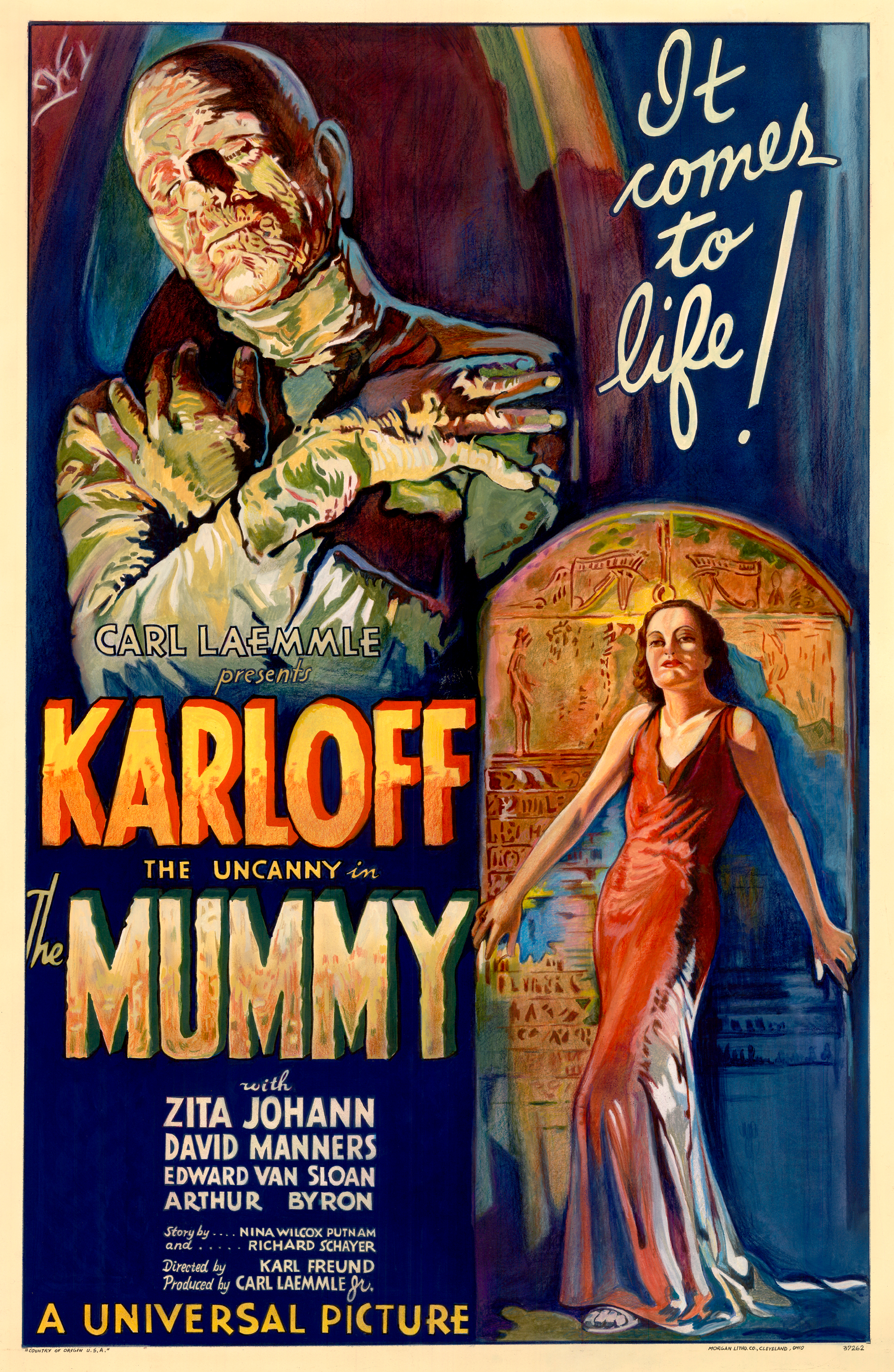
Poster for The Mummy (1932)

Year	Title	Role	Notes
1931	The Struggle	Florrie Wilson	
1932	Tiger Shark	Quita Silva	
1932	The Mummy	Helen Grosvenor	
1933	Luxury Liner	Miss Morgan	
1933	The Man Who Dared	Teena Pavelic	
1933	The Sin of Nora Moran	Nora Moran	
1934	Grand Canary	Suzan Tranter	
1986	Raiders of the Living Dead	Librarian	
1993	D. W. Griffith: Father of Film	On-screen participant (documentary)	
