= Strictly Dynamite =

1934 film by Elliott Nugent

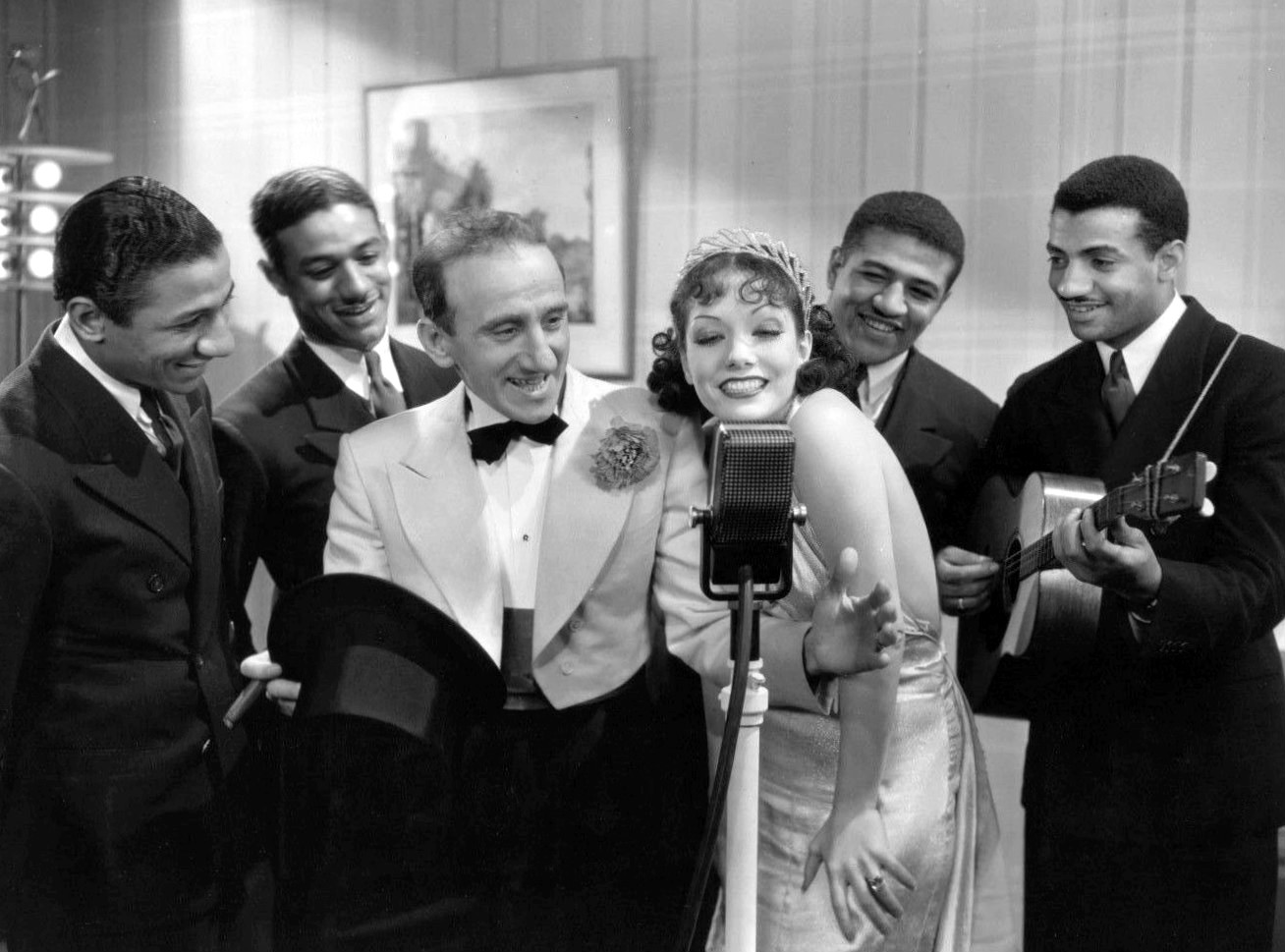
- Jimmy Durante, Lupe Vélez and the Mills Brothers in a scene from the film.
- Directed by: Elliott Nugent (unbilled)
- Written by: Jack Harvey
- Produced by: Pandro S. Berman (executive producer)
- Cinematography: Edward Cronjager
- Edited by: George Crone
- Music by: Burton Lane (music); Harold Adamson (lyrics); Sammy Fain (music); Irving Kahal (lyrics); Jimmy McHugh; Dorothy Fields; Arnold Johnson; Jimmy Durante; Bernie Grossman; Harold Lewis
- Distributed by: RKO Radio Pictures
- Release date: May 11, 1934
- Running time: 71 minutes
- Country: United States
- Language: English

Strictly Dynamite is a 1934 American pre-Code comedy film directed by Elliott Nugent and starring Lupe Vélez and Jimmy Durante.

== Plot ==
A poet's life changes when he begins writing comedy and develops an infatuation for the comedian's volatile partner.

== Cast ==
- Jimmy Durante as Moxie
- Lupe Vélez as Vera
- Norman Foster as Nick
- William Gargan as Georgie
- Marian Nixon as Sylvia
- Eugene Pallette as Sourwood
- Sterling Holloway as Elmer Fleming
- Minna Gombell as Miss LaSeur
- Leila Bennett as Miss Hoffman
- Franklin Pangborn as Mr. Bailey
- Berton Churchill as Mr. Rivers
- Irene Franklin as Mrs. Figg
- Jackie Searl as Robin (as Jackie Searle)
- Stanley Fields as Pussy
- Tom Kennedy as Junior
- Burton Lane (uncredited)
- Elliott Nugent (uncredited)
- Leonid Kinsky as Garçon, a servant to Moxie (uncredited)

== See also ==
- List of American films of 1934
