= A Time to Live =

American 1985 made-for-TV drama film

- Genre: Drama
- Based on: Intensive Care by Mary-Lou Weisman
- Written by: John McGreevey
- Directed by: Rick Wallace
- Starring: Liza Minnelli; Jeffrey DeMunn; Swoosie Kurtz; Corey Haim
- Music by: Georges Delerue
- Country of origin: United States
- Original language: English

Production
- Executive producer: Judith A. Polone
- Producer: Blue André
- Production location: Montréal
- Cinematography: Fred Murphy
- Editor: William Anderson
- Running time: 95 minutes
- Production companies: ITC Entertainment; Blue André Productions

Original release
- Network: NBC
- Release: October 28, 1985

A Time to Live is a 1985 American made-for-television drama film directed by Rick Wallace and starring Liza Minnelli (in her television film debut), Jeffrey DeMunn, Swoosie Kurtz, Scott Schwartz and Corey Haim. It was broadcast on NBC on October 28, 1985.

The film is based on the 1982 book Intensive Care written by Mary-Lou Weisman which tells the true story of the Weismans' experience and struggle to raise their son Peter, who had muscular dystrophy. For her performance, Minnelli won a Golden Globe Award for Best Performance by an Actress in a Miniseries or Motion Picture Made for Television.

== Synopsis ==
Mary-Lou and Larry Weisman first learned that their younger son, Peter, had muscular dystrophy when he was two-and-a-half years old. The doctor told them that the child's muscles would slowly atrophy, and he would eventually die of pneumonia. Mary-Lou and Larry fought to make the next thirteen years that Peter lived intensely loving and fulfilling. And, in the process, they learned a lot about themselves, their marriage, their sons and the importance of the quality of life over the quantity of life.

== Cast ==
- Liza Minnelli as Mary-Lou Weisman
- Jeffrey DeMunn as Larry Weisman
- Swoosie Kurtz as Patricia
- Scott Schwartz as Adam Weisman
- Corey Haim as Peter Weisman
- Henry G. Sanders as Fred

== Production ==
A Time to Live was filmed from August 12 to September 1985 on location in Montreal, Quebec, Canada.

== Awards and nominations ==
Year	Award	Category	Name	Result
1986	Golden Globe Award	Best Performance by an Actress in a Miniseries or Motion Picture Made for Television	Liza Minnelli	Won
1986	Young Artist Award	Exceptional Performance by a Young Actor Starring in a TV Special or Movie of the Week	Corey Haim	Won
1986	Young Artist Award	Exceptional Performance by a Young Actor in a Supporting Role: TV Series, TV Special or Movie of the Week	Scott Schwartz	Nominated
1986	Young Artist Award	Exceptional Family TV Special or Movie of the Week	A Time to Live	Nominated

== Home media ==
In 1986, A Time to Live was released on VHS by Vista Home Video.
