= Leila Bennett =

American actress (1892–1965)

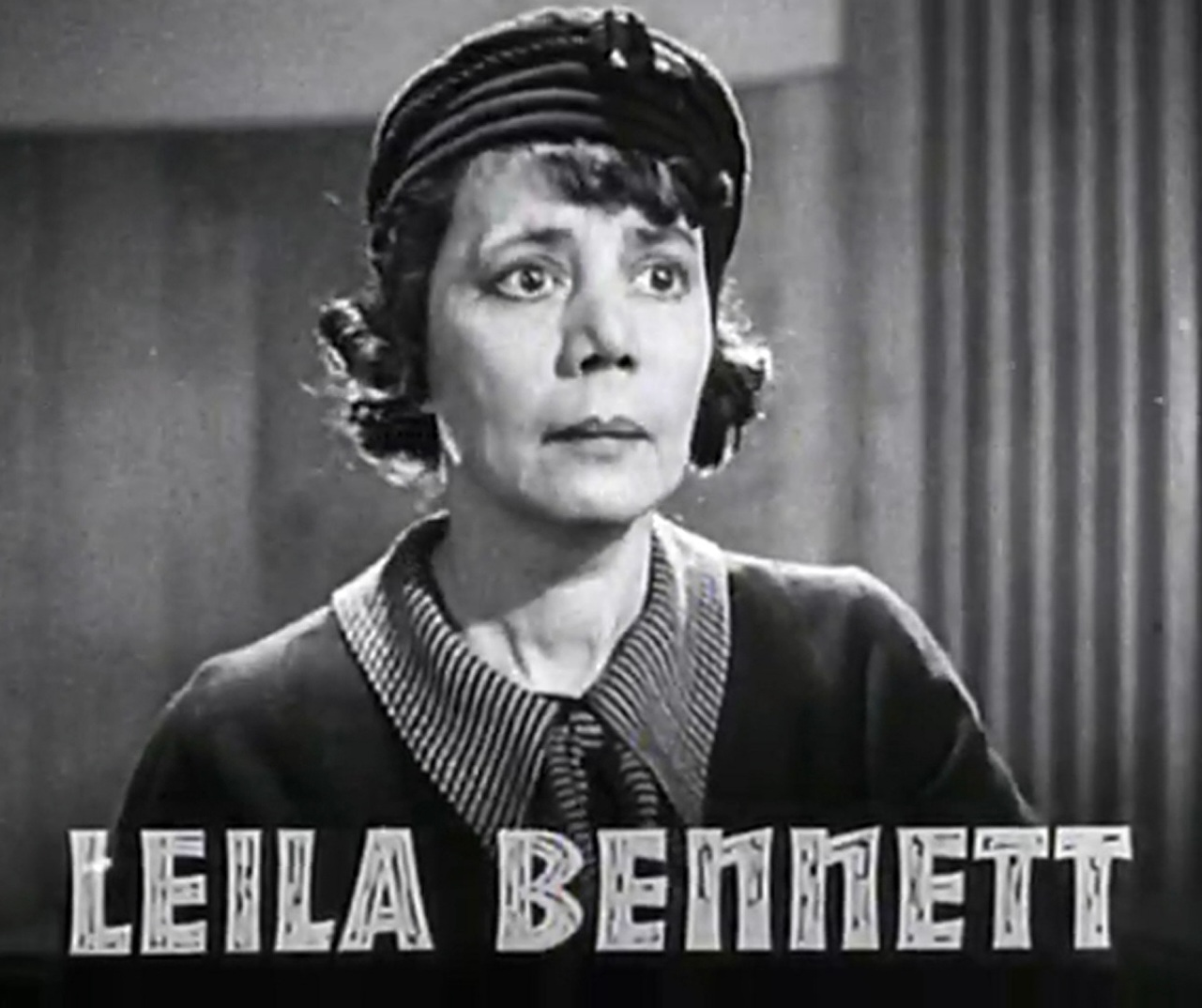
- Bennet in the trailer for Fury (1936)
- Born: November 17, 1892; Newark, New Jersey, U.S.
- Died: January 5, 1965 (aged 72); New York City, U.S.
- Resting place: Fairmount Cemetery, Newark, New Jersey
- Occupation: Actress
- Years active: 1919–1936
- Spouse: Francis Keough (m. 1934; died 1945)

Leila Bennett (November 17, 1892 – January 5, 1965) was an American film actress who primarily appeared in supporting roles as either slapstick sidekicks, mousy maids, and scatterbrains.

== Early life ==
Bennett was born in Newark, New Jersey, into a working-class family; her father worked as a newspaper editor and her mother was a part-time stenographer and housewife. The whole family was affiliated with the church of Christian Science.

== Acting career ==
After working through the Harry Blaney Stock Company in Brooklyn, New York, she began her career on the New York stage in 1919 portraying the character of 'Mandy Coulter' in the comedy production Thunder. She was praised for her role, which was performed in black-face, by the New-York Tribune.

She also was featured in the plays The First Year (1920–22), The Wheel (1921), Chicken Feed (1923–24), A Holy Terror (1925), It's a Wise Child (1929–30), and, in what was her final stage appearance, Company's Coming (1931). Following her departure from live theatre in 1931, she continued her craft on the screen making her film debut in an uncredited role in Gentleman's Fate playing a lunch counter attendant. Her next role came in the film Emma (1932) playing a maid opposite the likes of Marie Dressler and Myrna Loy followed by a role in Taxi! (1932) opposite James Cagney and Loretta Young. In 1932 alone she appeared in six films; others being The Purchase Price with Barbara Stanwyck, Tiger Shark, and Doctor X with Lee Tracy and Fay Wray. In 1933, she appeared as Anna May Wong's ladies maid in A Study in Scarlet. She was very much a freelancer and floated around Hollywood doing numerous films at such studios as Warner Bros., RKO Radio Pictures, Columbia Pictures, and Metro-Goldwyn-Mayer. In Mark of the Vampire (1935), she played a "terrified maid." In 1936 she appeared as Edna Hopper in Fury opposite Spencer Tracy and Sylvia Sidney, providing "splendid support," according to the Chillicothe Constitution-Tribune.

== Personal life and death ==
She was married to Francis M. Keough from 1934 until his death in 1945; Keough had been the main manager of Palm Beach's Beach Club Restaurant and Casino, and she spent her years dividing time between New York City and Florida. On January 5, 1965, she died at the age of 72 in New York City, New York. Her funeral was held at The Universal Chapel on 52nd and Lexington Avenue in New York and her interment was at Fairmount Cemetery in Newark, New Jersey with her parents in the family plot (specifically Section F, Lot 157, Grave 3 rear).

== Filmography ==
- Gentleman's Fate (1931)
- Emma (1932)
- Taxi! (1932) - Ruby.
- The Purchase Price (1932)
- The First Year (1932)
- Doctor X (1932)
- Tiger Shark (1932)
- No Other Woman (1933)
- Terror Abroad (1933)
- A Study in Scarlet (1933)
- Sunset Pass (1933)
- The Prizefighter and the Lady (1933)
- Easy to Love (1934)
- Once to Every Woman (1934)
- Unknown Blonde (1934)
- Strictly Dynamite (1934)
- Housewife (1934)
- Dames (1934)
- Wagon Wheels (1934)
- One New York Night (1935)
- Mark of the Vampire (1935) as Maria
- Fury (1936) as Edna Hooper
