= Kidco =

- Theatrical poster
- Directed by: Ronald F. Maxwell
- Written by: Bennett Tramer
- Produced by: Frank Yablans; David Niven, Jr.
- Starring: Scott Schwartz; Clifton James
- Cinematography: Paul Lohmann
- Edited by: David E. McKenna
- Music by: Michael Small
- Distributed by: 20th Century Fox
- Release date: April 13, 1984
- Running time: 104 minutes
- Country: United States
- Language: English
- Budget: $4 million
- Box office: $125-500,000

Kidco is a 1984 American comedy film directed by Ronald F. Maxwell and starring Scott Schwartz, Clifton James, Charles Hallahan, Maggie Blye, and Vincent Schiavelli.

Although the premise sounds far-fetched, the film was based on the 1979 purchase of the public land in Gorda, California by Kidco Limited Ventures, a corporation owned by four children, all minors from Ramona, California, who were heirs of the family that owned the Cessna Aircraft company. After funding the company, $500,000 was invested as a tax shelter to purchase the town's land. At the time, Dickie Cessna was 14 years old and the other three siblings were June (16), Bette (13) and Nene (11). After the Cessna children were paid for the filming rights, a dramatized version of the events was made and distributed by 20th Century.

== Plot ==
An enterprising middle school boy named Dickie Cessna (Scott Schwartz), who lives at a country club where his father works decides to make some extra money by selling composted horse manure as fertilizer, and has his three sisters, Nene, June and Bette (two of whom are older) join him in the enterprise. As their sales increase, they draw increased scrutiny from the state tax board, as well as the large scale competitor who seeks to put them out of business at any cost.

The children eventually fight a court case brought against them by tax collectors from the State of California. They are able to prove that the fertilizer is not taxable as tax had already been paid on the horse feed before the horses processed it into manure, removing one of the counts brought upon them. They eventually pleaded guilty to the others, which allows them to stay in business, to the consternation of the adult competitor.

== Cast ==
- Scott Schwartz as Richard "Dickie" Cessna, Jr.
- Clifton James as Orville Peterjohn
- Charles Hallahan as Richard Cessna, Sr.
- Maggie Blye as Joan Cessna
- Cinnamon Idles as Nene Cessna
- Tristine Skyler as Bette Cessna
- Elizabeth Gorcey as June Cessna
- Basil Hoffman as Sid Fein
- Phil Rubenstein as Mel Sloman
- Vincent Schiavelli as Phil Porzinski
- Mahlon Richmond as Harvey Peterjohn
- Allan Rich as Jim Clark
- Ron Rifkin as George Tuskie
- Benny Baker as Judge Oliver T. Willoughby
- Ken Magee as Charles Grundy
- Marty Van Hoe as Skip Russo

== Production ==
The film was shot on location in Tucson, Arizona in 1982.

== Release ==
The movie opened only in Alabama as a "courtesy" release by 20th Century Fox, making only around $125,000 or $500,000, depending on the source. The film garnered further exposure from frequent airings on HBO in the mid-80s.
