= Luxury Liner (1933 film) =

1933 American drama film directed by Lothar Mendes

- Theatrical release poster
- Directed by: Lothar Mendes
- Written by: Gene Markey; Kathryn Scola
- Based on: Die Überfahrt by: 1932 novel; Gina Kaus
- Produced by: B.P. Schulberg
- Starring: George Brent; Zita Johann; Vivienne Osborne; Alice White
- Cinematography: Victor Milner
- Edited by: Eda Warren
- Production company: Paramount Pictures
- Distributed by: Paramount Pictures
- Release date: February 3, 1933
- Running time: 70 minutes
- Country: United States
- Language: English

Luxury Liner is a 1933 American pre-Code drama film directed by Lothar Mendes and starring George Brent, Zita Johann and Vivienne Osborne. It was based on a 1932 novel by Gina Kaus, and made by Paramount Pictures. Mendes worked on a number of films for Paramount during the era. Shortly after making the film, he went to Britain where he directed his most celebrated film Jew Süss.

== Plot ==
The steamship Germania is setting sail from Bremen to New York, with a stop in Cherbourg. Dr. Veith is annoyed that he has been assigned to be the ship's doctor, as he would rather stay home with his family. His married friend and fellow ship's officer Baron von Luden tries to flirt with the ship's nurse, Morgan, but she is not interested. Veith says Morgan seems to have no friends and never leaves the ship when it is in port.

Dr. Veith meets his old friend Dr. Bernhard (George Brent), who is desperate to sail on the sold-out ship because his wife Sybil (Vivienne Osborne) is on board, running away with her lover, the financier Alex Stevanson (Frank Morgan). Veith arranges for Bernhard to take his place. To Bernhard's surprise, his wife's cabin is empty; a maid suggests that she might board at Cherbourg.

Milli Lensch (Alice White), a winsome young blonde who is traveling in third class, but eager to make her way up in the world, flirts with old Edward Thorndyke (C. Aubrey Smith). Thorndyke was once a wealthy textile manufacturer, but he was ruined by Stevanson and is now seeking to start over in America. Schultz, one of Thorndyke's former employees and now a company owner, comes down from 2nd class to invite Thorndyke (and Milli) to take tea with him tomorrow. Thorndyke turns him down, but Milli is delighted to accept.

After the ship docks at Cherbourg, Bernhard goes to his wife's cabin, but she locks the door and refuses to see him. Bernhard is called away by a medical emergency before he can break the door down. Meanwhile, Stevanson is very pleased to encounter opera singer Luise Marheim (Verree Teasdale).

Stevanson sends a telegram ordering the purchase of German-American Steamship shares, causing other passengers to also rush to buy the stock. When the third-class passengers want to pool their meager funds to do the same, Thorndyke reluctantly offers to handle the transaction.

Milli enjoys dancing in second class, although she fails to persuade Schultz to buy her a present. When Schultz's business acquaintance, jewelry dealer Exl (Theodore von Eltz), comes along, she gets him to invite her up to first class. This disappoints an elevator operator (Barry Norton) who has fallen for her and promised to show her New York. After a fine dinner and champagne, Exl takes Milli to his cabin and tries to force himself on her in return for a diamond bracelet. She flees to the arms of her elevator operator and realizes that she prefers to be poor but honorable.

After Bernhard delivers a baby, he confronts his wayward wife. She tells him she never loved him. When Stevanson tries to intervene, Bernard punches him and leaves. Stevanson then has his things moved to another suite, much to Sybil's distress.

Sybil finds Stevanson dining with Luise. He tells Sybil their relationship is over and he will "write her a check" to be rid of her. In his stateroom, Sybil kills Stevanson with the pistol she stole from Bernhard's desk. Bernhard arrives moments afterwards and takes the blame. When Morgan cannot make him defend himself, she becomes greatly agitated and reveals that, five years ago, she had a husband and two children. After he left her for another woman, she tried to kill herself and her children. She was saved, but her babies died. Bernhard regrets that he did not meet her sooner. Sybil then jumps overboard, but not before leaving a note in which she admits killing Stevanson. Bernhard and Morgan decide to start a new life together as the ship pulls into New York.

With Stevanson dead, the value of German-American Steamship shares plummets. The third-class passengers fear they are penniless – until Thorndyke reveals that he never invested their money.

== Cast ==
- George Brent as Dr. Karl Bernhard
- Zita Johann as Miss Morgan
- Vivienne Osborne as Sybil Bernhard
- Alice White as Milli Lensch
- Verree Teasdale as Luise Marheim
- Frank Morgan as Alex Stevanson
- C. Aubrey Smith as Edward Thorndyke
- Wallis Clark as Dr. Veith
- Henry Wadsworth as Fritz
- Billy Bevan as Schultz
- Theodore von Eltz as Exl
- Barry Norton as Prince Vladimir Gleboff
- Henry Victor as Baron von Luden
- Edith Yorke as Mrs. Webber, a poor, elderly woman whose life is saved by Bernhard
- Christian Rub as Peasant Father
- Barbara Barondess as Frieda's Mother

== Reception ==
Mordaunt Hall, critic for The New York Times, was unimpressed, writing, "neither the story nor the dialogue live up to expectations. ... Mr. Mendes was evidently not inspired by the script furnished him and he fails to give more than a haphazard conception of the movement of the vessel, after the first quarter of the film. The attempt at levity is feeble and the clock-work-like manipulation of the happenings is often rather wearying." He felt there were "one or two competent performances by the principals" (C. Aubrey Smith, Zita Johann and Vivienne Osborne), but thought that Frank Morgan was miscast and George Brent was "not at his best".

== Bibliography ==
- Bock, Hans-Michael & Bergfelder, Tim. The Concise Cinegraph: Encyclopaedia of German Cinema. Berghahn Books, 2009.
