= Scott Schwartz =

American former child actor (born 1968)

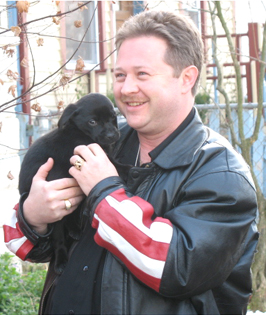
- Scott Schwartz
- Born: May 12, 1968 (age 58); Sacramento, California, U.S.
- Other names: Scottie Schwartz; Scotty Schwartz
- Occupation: Actor
- Years active: 1981–present

Scott Schwartz (born May 12, 1968) is an American actor best known for his roles in the films The Toy (1982), A Christmas Story (1983) and A Christmas Story Christmas (2022), and Kidco (1984).

== Early life ==
Scott Schwartz was born on May 12, 1968 in Sacramento, California. His father was Elvis Presley's US Army company clerk in Germany from 1958 to 1960. Schwartz grew up in Bridgewater Township, New Jersey, and attended Eisenhower Junior High School. He attended high school in 1982–1983 and 1985–1986 at Bridgewater-Raritan High School West in Bridgewater, with future professional basketball player Eric Murdock. He moved on to attend the Professional Children's School from 1983 to 1985.

== Career ==
Schwartz co-starred opposite Richard Pryor and Jackie Gleason in 1982's The Toy directed by Richard Donner. In 1982, Schwartz filmed Kidco directed by Ronald F. Maxwell. In 1983, he was featured in the Christmas film A Christmas Story as Flick, who got his tongue stuck to a frozen flagpole. In 1985, Schwartz co-starred with Liza Minnelli, Corey Haim, and Jeffrey DeMunn in the television film A Time to Live.

In the 1990s, Schwartz worked in the adult film industry, and behind the scenes in numerous administrative roles. After appearing in more than a dozen films in various capacities, he quit in 1999.

Since 2006, Schwartz has pursued his acting career, and helped create a line of celebrity-based trading cards for Donruss. He has also obtained celebrity autographs for companies such as: Upper Deck, Razor, Leaf, and In the Game. In 2008, Schwartz wrote for the sports card magazine Beckett, and was featured on the cover of the September 2008 issue of Sports Card Monthly alongside Darren McFadden and Josh Hamilton.

In the wake of his former castmate Corey Haim's death in March 2010, Schwartz sold Haim's personal belongings on eBay at the behest of the Haim family. Schwartz was also president of A Minor Consideration, a child actors' advocacy organization established in 1990 by actor Paul Petersen.

In 2022, Schwartz reprised his role as Flick in the A Christmas Story sequel, A Christmas Story Christmas for Warner Bros. Pictures and HBO Max.

== Filmography ==
Year	Title	Role	Notes
1982	The Toy	Eric Bates	
1983	A Christmas Story	Flick	
1984	Kidco	Dickie Cessna	
1985	A Time to Live	Adam Weisman	TV movie
1986	Raiders of the Living Dead	Jonathan	
1988	Fear	Brian Haden	
1990	Beauty and the Beast: Part II	Flick	
1996	Scotty's X-Rated Adventure	Flick	
2004	Skin Walker		
2004	Unseen Evil 2	Joey	
2009	Community College	Bar Owner	
2020	A Wrestling Christmas Miracle	Ronald	
2022	A Christmas Story Christmas	Flick	

=== Television ===
Year	Title	Role	Notes
1984	Young People's Specials	The	Episode: "That Funny Fat Kid"
1984	ABC Afterschool Special	Ben Andrews	Episode: "Summer Switch"
1987	21 Jump Street	Jordan Simms	Episode: "Bad Influence"
1987	Rags to Riches	Curtis	Episode: "Once in a Lifeguard"
1988	TV 101	Student	Episode: "Rolling"
