= The Voice of Bugle Ann =

1936 film by Richard Thorpe

- Directed by: Richard Thorpe
- Written by: Harvey Gates, Samuel Hoffenstein, MacKinlay Kantor (novel)
- Produced by: John W. Considine Jr.
- Starring: Lionel Barrymore; Maureen O'Sullivan
- Cinematography: Ernest Haller
- Edited by: George Boemler
- Music by: Score: Rudolph G. Kopp; Songs: Jimmy McHugh (music); Harold Adamson (lyrics)
- Production company: Metro-Goldwyn-Mayer
- Distributed by: Loews, Inc.
- Release date: February 15, 1936
- Running time: 72 minutes
- Country: United States
- Language: English

The Voice of Bugle Ann is a 1936 American drama film directed by Richard Thorpe and starring Lionel Barrymore and Maureen O'Sullivan. It was based on a novel of the same name by MacKinlay Kantor.

== Plot ==
The countrymen in the hills of Missouri take the hounds on night fox hunts. This goes on until Jacob Terry comes into the county and decides to raise sheep and install a woven wire fence. This upsets the neighbors, as they are concerned about the dogs entering his fences and terrorizing the sheep. Jacob vows to shoot any dogs or people that he finds on his land. Bengy Davis is in love with Camden Terry and that alone causes problems. But when the hound, Bugle Ann is missing one night, both sides are out with guns to settle the score.

== Cast ==
- Lionel Barrymore as Spring Davis
- Maureen O'Sullivan as Camden Terry
- Eric Linden as Benjy Davis
- Dudley Digges as Jacob Terry
- Spring Byington as Ma Davis
- Charley Grapewin as Cal Royster
- Henry Wadsworth as Bake Royster
- William Newell as Mr. Tanner
- James Macklin as Del Royster
- Jonathan Hale as District Attorney
- Frederick Burton as The warden

== See also ==
- Lionel Barrymore filmography

== Production dates ==
25 November—30 December 1935
