= Iced (film) =

- Promotional poster
- Directed by: Jeff Kwitny
- Screenplay by: Joseph Alan Johnson
- Produced by: Robert Seibert
- Starring: Debra De Liso; Doug Stevenson; Elizabeth Gorcey; Ron Kologie; Joseph Alan Johnson; Lisa Loring
- Cinematography: Eugene D. Shlugleit
- Edited by: Carol Oblath
- Music by: Dan Milner
- Production company: Mikon Releasing Corporation
- Distributed by: Prism Entertainment
- Release date: February 7, 1989 (U.S.)
- Running time: 87 minutes
- Country: United States
- Language: English

Iced is a 1989 American slasher film directed by Jeff Kwitny, and produced by Robert Seibert. It stars Debra De Liso, Doug Stevenson, Elizabeth Gorcey, Ron Kologie, Joseph Alan Johnson (who also wrote the screenplay), and Lisa Loring. The plot follows a group of friends who are mysteriously invited to a ski resort, where they are stalked and murdered by a masked killer.

== Plot ==
Four years after their friend Jeff dies in a nighttime skiing accident after being jilted by his lover, a group of childhood friends—couples Trina and Cory; physician John and Diane; Eddie and Jeanette; and Carl—converge upon Snow Peak, a newly renovated posh ski resort where they have been mysteriously invited for an exclusive New Year's Eve event by real estate developer Alex Bourne.

Eddie, who is traveling alone to the resort, is killed before arrival by an assailant with a snowplow while parked along a road. Diane and John are also traveling nearby toward the resort. Meanwhile, Jeanette awaits Eddie's arrival, while Trina expresses guilt over Jeff's death, as the friends believe he committed suicide upon finding Diane having sex with John.

Carl is troubled by nightmares about Jeff, while Jeanette, in Eddie's absence, seduces Alex Bourne while he visits the group at their chalet to welcome them to the resort. As the group socialize, Jeanette receives a mysterious phone call from someone impersonating Eddie, who tells her he is "here with Jeff now." Alex recognizes Jeff's name, claiming Jeff was on the guest list, and that Jeff accepted his invitation to the resort. The group suspect Jeff's invitation was included as Alex acquired their names via mailing list from the resort they visited four years earlier where Jeff died. As tensions rise, Alex leaves, and the friends argue over the circumstances that led to Jeff's death. John reveals he found a newspaper clipping in her room about Jeff's death.

John is summoned to the hospital where he works to perform an emergency C-section on a patient. As John and Diane attempt to leave, the killer, donning a ski suit, impales John through the throat with a ski pole before stabbing Diane to death with a large icicle. Jeanette goes to relax in the hot tub, where the killer electrocutes her by throwing an electric heater into the water. The electrical short causes a power outage in the chalet, which awakens Carl. Outside, Carl sees the killer waving a kerosene lantern. When Carl goes to investigate, he is killed in a bear trap, accidentally firing his revolver in the process. The gunfire awakens Cory, who is stabbed in the chest by the killer in the kitchen.

At dawn, Trina awakens and finds an injured Cory still clinging to life, as well as the corpses of Jeanette, Diane, John, and Carl. She takes Carl's revolver before phoning Alex for help. Trina is pursued upstairs by the killer before unmasking him, revealing him to be Alex. Alex reveals that he was a friend of Jeff's, and found his body the night he died. Alex seriously injured himself in the process of rushing to Jeff, resulting in his leg being amputated, dashing his hopes of a career as a professional skier. Just before Alex is about to kill Trina, Cory manages to climb upstairs and shoot him to death.

Some time later, Cory and Trina, now with a daughter, are vacationing at a snowy cabin. When Trina approaches a snowman built by her daughter, blood begins to pour from its eye before Alex bursts out of it.

== Cast ==
- Debra De Liso as Trina (credited as Debra DeLiso)
- Doug Stevenson as Cory
- Ron Kologie as Carl
- Elizabeth Gorcey as Diane
- John C. Cooke as John
- Joseph Alan Johnson as Alex Bourne
- Dan Smith as Jeff Stinson
- Michael Picardi as Eddie
- Lisa Loring as Jeanette Foster
- Sharon Bingham as Suzanne
- Mark Turner as a Bartender
- Rodney Montague as Biff

== Production ==
Parts of the film were shot at Big Cottonwood Canyon in Utah. Commenting on the film, actress Debra DeLiso said: "I don't think it's what [writer] Joe [Johnson] envisioned when he wrote it. The script had a lot more suspense and humor, which didn't come through." Comparing it to her previous slasher film credit, DeLiso said: "It had some scenes which are funny, but I think the difference between Iced and The Slumber Party Massacre is that Slumber Party Massacre intentionally had a lot of laughs."

== Release ==
While the film was released on VHS and Betamax by Prism Entertainment and CBS/Fox Video in February 1989, it went unreleased in any other format until Vinegar Syndrome released a Blu-Ray edition through their sub-label Degausser Video, made available through their online store in January 2025.

== Reception ==
Josh G. from Oh, the Horror! gave a negative review on the film, calling it "a slasher movie that secretly wants to be a soap opera, and has an ending that clears nothing up."

Brian Orndorf criticized the film's slow pacing and limited payoff.

== Sources ==
- D'Arc, James V. (2019). When Hollywood Came to Town: A History of Moviemaking in Utah (Second ed.). Layton, Utah: Gibbs Smith. ISBN 978-1-423-65281-6.
- Senn, Bryan (2022). Ski Films: A Comprehensive Guide. Jefferson, North Carolina: McFarland. ISBN 978-1-476-67219-9.
