= The Toy (1982 film) =

1982 comedy film by Richard Donner

- Theatrical release poster
- Directed by: Richard Donner
- Screenplay by: Carol Sobieski
- Based on: Le Jouet by Francis Veber
- Produced by: Phil Feldman; Ray Stark
- Starring: Richard Pryor; Jackie Gleason; Teresa Ganzel; Wilfrid Hyde-White; Ned Beatty; Scott Schwartz
- Cinematography: László Kovács
- Edited by: Richard A. Harris; Michael A. Stevenson
- Music by: Patrick Williams
- Production company: Rastar Pictures
- Distributed by: Columbia Pictures
- Release date: December 10, 1982
- Running time: 102 minutes
- Country: United States
- Language: English
- Budget: $17 million
- Box office: $47,118,057 (United States and Canada)

The Toy is a 1982 American comedy film directed by Richard Donner. The film stars Richard Pryor as a janitor at a department store owned by a businessman played by Jackie Gleason. The owner's son, played by Scott Schwartz, is told that he may have anything in the toy department. He chooses the janitor, who the owner pays to spend a week with the boy. The film also stars Ned Beatty, Teresa Ganzel, and Virginia Capers. It is an adaptation of the 1976 French comedy film Le Jouet. It was a box office success, despite being pilloried by film critics.

== Plot ==
Jack Brown is an unemployed writer in Baton Rouge, Louisiana, in danger of having his house repossessed. After numerous unsuccessful attempts to get a job working for the local paper, the Bugle, he becomes so desperate that he ends up taking a job as a janitor for the wealthy and ruthless businessman U.S. Bates, who owns the paper, a department store and many other businesses. Brown is humiliated as he clumsily attempts to serve food at a luncheon. He is fired by Bates but still shows up to work that evening at the department store. "Master" Eric Bates, the spoiled son of the boss, sees Jack while looking through Bates' department store. Amused at seeing Jack goof around in the store's toy section, Eric informs his father's long-suffering right-hand man, Sydney Morehouse, that what he wants is Jack himself.

Morehouse fails to convince Eric that human beings cannot be owned. In exchange for a generous financial settlement to stave off repossession, Jack agrees to be Eric's live-in friend during Eric's one-week spring break from military school.

Emotionally estranged from his father, Eric takes a liking to Jack but still manages to humiliate him with numerous pranks. After a particularly humiliating incident in the mansion incited by Bates' ditzy trophy wife Fancy, who introduces him at a dinner party as Eric's new "toy", Jack grows tired of the situation and leaves. He agrees to return only when Bates (with Morehouse as his proxy) offers Jack enough money to pay off the full mortgage.

When Jack returns, Eric reveals that he 'bought' Jack because he wanted a friend. After another prank, Jack is determined to teach Eric how a friend is supposed to be treated. They bond while participating in mini-cart racing, video games, and fishing. The pair decide to start a newspaper of their own. After witnessing multiple examples of Bates' cruelty to his employees, they dig up dirt on him, such as a story of how he won his butler, Barkley, in a game of billiards. They publish their paper and distribute it throughout the city. When Morehouse finds a copy and presents it to his boss, Bates is outraged, but keeps his anger in check and calls Jack and Eric for a private meeting at his office.

To prove to his son that money can buy loyalty, he offers Jack a reporting job with his newspaper in exchange for shutting their newspaper down, which is what Jack wanted all along. When he accepts, Eric is upset because he thinks Jack is selling out. Jack tells Eric that most men need jobs, just as his priority is to support himself and his wife.

An outdoor party is later held at the Bates estate, attended by prominent citizens who are supporters of a senator. They are unaware that members of the KKK are also in attendance. Jack's wife, Angela, tries to bring attention to this with her anti-Klan group, but Jack convinces her to leave. He learns the true reason for the party is to get the KKK Grand Wizard and the senator together in a picture, which Bates would then use to blackmail the senator. Jack and Eric team up to disrupt the party, which is witnessed from afar by Angela and her group. Jack informs the senator of Bates' intentions and he leaves the party in outrage. Jack then proceeds to embarrass the Grand Wizard by causing him to fall into a bowl of chocolate fudge. The Grand Wizard throws a pie at Jack, but hits a policeman instead, leading to his arrest. Bates chases after Jack in a golf cart but ends up crashing into the pool. Jack saves him from drowning and Bates thanks him while confessing that he feels Eric doesn't love him. Jack then tells Bates that he must tell Eric that he loves him and show him that he loves him. Jack then leaves for home.

The next day, while driving Eric to the airport to return to military school, Bates tries desperately to have a heart-to-heart talk. Eric runs off to Jack's house. Jack refuses to let Eric live with him and gently admonishes the boy to give his father a chance. Bates arrives and confesses to his son how much he truly does love him and Eric finally accepts it and the two embrace. As he and Eric depart for the airport, Bates says his offer for the newspaper job stands and promises Eric that next year he will have two weeks of spring vacation: one with Jack and one with himself, much to Eric's joy.

== Cast ==
- Richard Pryor as Jack Brown
- Jackie Gleason as Ulysses "U.S." Bates
- Scott Schwartz as "Master" Eric Bates
- Ned Beatty as Sydney Morehouse
- Teresa Ganzel as Fancy Bates
- Wilfrid Hyde-White as Barkley
- Annazette Chase as Angela Brown
- Virginia Capers as Ruby Simpson
- Tony King as Clifford
- Richard Donner as Man in Red Hat (uncredited cameo)

== Production ==
The film was made by Rastar, the company of Ray Stark, then under the head of a production Guy McElwaine, who had been an agent of clients including Pryor before being enticed to join Rastar.

In his autobiography Pryor Convictions, Pryor wrote that he and Gleason got along like "kindred souls". He stated the stories Gleason told between setups were funnier than the film itself. Moreover, in a 1982 Los Angeles Times interview Pryor stated he had "loved Jackie Gleason for years." A national talent search was held to find an actor to play Gleason's son.

Pryor cast Annazette Chase to portray Angela after they worked together in The Mack (1973). The film was shot on location in Baton Rouge, Louisiana during the summer of 1982.

In May, during filming, Pryor was hospitalized with pneumonia. He was released after a week and resumed filming. Donner blamed this on the air pollution in Baton Rouge which he said was the worst he had ever experienced. The director said he would "never" work in the city again.

Michael Jackson attempted to write a theme song for the film and a possible soundtrack in 1981, but did not complete it due to his commitments working on the Thriller album. Jackson would continue to rework the track throughout his career, renaming it "I Am Your Joy", and eventually, "Best of Joy". A version recorded in 2008 was remixed by Theron "Neff-U" Feemster and Brad Buxer, being released posthumously on the Michael album in 2010. In 2022, Jackson's original demo was released on Thriller 40 under the title "The Toy".

== Release ==
=== Box office ===
The film opened in the United States the same weekend as Airplane II: The Sequel and 48 Hrs. and finished at number one for the weekend with a gross of $6,322,804 from 1,381 screens. Despite the bad reviews, the film was a financial success and grossed $47,118,057 in the United States and Canada.

=== Critical reception ===
The Toy was panned by critics. On Rotten Tomatoes the film has an approval rating of 3% based on reviews from 30 critics, with the consensus reading: "A muddled and unfunny collision of two comedic titans, The Toy is unsuitable for children -- or anyone else seeking entertainment." Metacritic gave the film a score of 16 based on 8 reviews, indicating an "overwhelming dislike".

Vincent Canby gave the film a negative review, stating "My mind wasn't simply wandering during the film—it was ricocheting between the screen and the exit sign." Gene Siskel of The Chicago Tribune, noting his disappointment in his two-star rating, criticized the movie as having too much "smarm" along with not utilizing the talents of Pryor and Gleason together on screen.

Margaret Booth, who worked for Ray Stark at the time, stated that she "couldn't stand" the film.
