= A Study in Scarlet (1933 film) =

1933 American horror film

- Lobby card
- Directed by: Edwin L. Marin
- Screenplay by: Robert Florey
- Produced by: Samuel Bischoff
- Starring: Reginald Owen; Anna May Wong; June Clyde; Alan Dinehart; John Warburton
- Cinematography: Arthur Edeson
- Edited by: Rose Loewinger
- Production company: KBS Productions
- Distributed by: Sono Art-World Wide Pictures; Fox Film Corporation
- Release date: May 14, 1933 (United States)
- Running time: 71 minutes
- Country: United States
- Language: English

A Study in Scarlet is a 1933 American pre-Code horror mystery thriller film directed by Edwin L. Marin and starring Reginald Owen as Sherlock Holmes and Anna May Wong as Mrs. Pyke. The title is taken from Arthur Conan Doyle's 1887 novel of the same name, the first in the Holmes series, but the screenplay by Robert Florey was original.

== Plot ==
A Study in Scarlet (1933)

The film opens in London in the present day. The body of Mr. Murphy is found dead on a train, apparently by suicide, but in fact, murdered.

A secret society holds a meeting in Limehouse, chaired by lawyer Thaddeus Merrydew. He reports Murphy's death, which follows the recent death of fellow member Colonel Forrester, whose daughter Eileen inherits her father's membership. Merrydew explains that Murphy's financial interest in the society will be divided between the surviving members, with Murphy's widow getting nothing.

Mrs. Murphy visits Sherlock Holmes at 221A Baker Street [sic] to ask his help to get payment from Merrydew. Mrs. Murphy shows Holmes a couplet from the counting-out rhyme "Ten Little Indians" written in pencil on a scrap of paper, which her husband had received before his death. Such couplets, counting down, are delivered before each of the subsequent murders. Holmes tells Dr. Watson that Merrydew is London's most dangerous crook and has eluded him several times previously, but this time he intends to catch him. Holmes notes an advertisement in code in The Daily Telegraph which he believes is connected with the case.

Merrydew warns Eileen that she should not marry her fiancé John Stanford for the time being. While they are talking one of the society's members, Captain Pyke, rushes in and Eileen sees him killed by a shot fired through the window. She is then terrified by the murderer's apparent accomplice and faints. Captain Pyke's body is identified by his wife, whose lawyer is Merrydew. Holmes does not believe what she tells him.

It appears that the members of the society are being killed off. Inspector Lestrade, Holmes and Watson investigate the death of member Malcolm Dearing. Holmes and Watson visit Merrydew to ask about Murphy's money, without success. They pass Mrs. Pyke, who is arriving. Holmes explains to Watson that the key to the code can be found in Whitaker's Almanack, which he has observed on Merrydew's desk.

Merrydew pays a call to Eileen to invite her to another meeting of the society, the Scarlet Ring. Eileen tells John that her late father had told her that Merrydew would arrange for her to receive a large inheritance. John visits Holmes, who says Eileen is in great danger.

Holmes disguises himself and goes to the Pykes' mansion The Grange in Shoeburyness (spelled Shoebryness), which is now for sale by Mrs. Pyke. His investigations there make him suspicious that Mrs. Pyke is collaborating with Merrydew. Holmes places newspaper advertisements requesting any information about the Scarlet Ring.

The Scarlet Ring holds another meeting, where some of its remaining members, especially Jabez Wilson, are fearful for their lives. Merrydew tells them that, after waiting five years, their scheme is about to pay out one million pounds, which is £200,000 for each of the five remaining members. Holmes and John arrive as the meeting breaks up. They smell gas and are just in time to save Eileen, who had been left to die. The terrified Wilson goes to Holmes to get his help after an apparent attempt is made on his life.

Wilson and Eileen are lured to The Grange without realizing they are next to be killed. Holmes, Lestrade and police officers surround and enter the mansion and rescue them. The killer is revealed as Captain Pyke, whose death had been fabricated. He is arrested for three murders, and Mrs. Pyke is arrested as an accomplice. Merrydew arrives with the gems, and is arrested as an accomplice. Eileen and John depart happily, and Holmes is content he has rid London of another master criminal.

== Cast ==
- Reginald Owen as Sherlock Holmes
- Anna May Wong as Mrs. Pyke
- June Clyde as Eileen Forrester
- Alan Dinehart (credited as Allan Dinehart) as Thaddeus Merrydew
- John Warburton as John Stanford
- Alan Mowbray as Inspector Lestrade (credited as Lastrade)
- Warburton Gamble as Dr. Watson
- J. M. Kerrigan as Jabez Wilson
- Wyndham Standing as Captain Pyke
- Billy Bevan as Will Swallow
- Leila Bennett as Daffy Dolly
- Halliwell Hobbes as Malcolm Dearing
- Doris Lloyd as Mrs. Murphy
- Hobart Cavanaugh as Thompson (uncredited)
- Olaf Hytten as Merrydew's Butler (uncredited)
- Tetsu Komai as Ah Yet (uncredited)
- Tempe Pigott as Mrs. Hudson (uncredited)
- Cecil Reynolds as William Baker (uncredited)

== Production ==
Despite her billing, Anna May Wong only appears on screen for under ten minutes. Reginald Owen had played Dr. Watson in Sherlock Holmes the previous year. Owen was one of a small number of actors to play both Holmes and Watson. Owen is also credited for "Continuity and dialogue" since he co-wrote the screenplay with Florey.

Merrydew's name may have been inspired by the villain referred to by Holmes as "Merridew of abominable memory" in The Adventure of the Empty House. The character Jabez Wilson shares the same name as the main character in the Holmes story The Red-Headed League, although there is no connection between that story and the film.
