= Raiders of the Living Dead =

- DVD cover
- Directed by: Samuel M. Sherman; Brett Piper (uncredited)
- Written by: Samuel M. Sherman; Brett Piper
- Produced by: Samuel M. Sherman; Dan Q. Kennis
- Starring: Scott Schwartz; Robert Deveau; Robert Allen; Donna Asali; Zita Johann
- Edited by: John Donaldson
- Music by: Tim Ferrante; George Edward Ott (Opening Theme)
- Distributed by: Independent International Pictures
- Release date: 1986
- Running time: 86 minutes
- Country: United States
- Language: English

Raiders of the Living Dead is a 1986 American horror film directed by Samuel M. Sherman from a script he co-wrote with Brett Piper.

== Plot ==
In an abandoned prison, a doctor revived executed convicts as the living dead. Jonathan (Scott Schwartz), a teenager, creates a weapon from a LaserDisc player's laser and pursues the walking dead, aided by his girlfriend and grandfather. A reporter on the trail of the story is helped by the town librarian. On the prison island, the zombies attack a security guard and tear him apart as the reporter and teenager venture into the prison caverns for a final showdown.

== Cast ==
- Scott Schwartz as Jonathan
- Robert Deveau as Morgan Randall
- Donna Asali as Shelly Godwin
- Robert Allen as Dr. Corstairs
- Zita Johann as Librarian
- Corri Burt as Michelle
- Bob Sacchetti as Man in Black

== Production ==
This film originally started in New Hampshire in 1983 by co-writer Brett Piper under the title Graveyard. It was later completed in three weeks by writer-producer Samuel Sherman. Veteran actress Zita Johann came out of retirement to appear in one scene as an elderly historian.

== Release ==
The film was not shown theatrically in the United States until May 28, 2017, at a special screening at the Mahoning Drive-In Theater in Lehighton, Pennsylvania, with producer/director Samuel M. Sherman in attendance.

The film was given a two-disc special edition DVD release in the United States by Image Entertainment in 2003. This version is currently out of print. This set contains three version of the film:

Version 1: the first cut called Dying Day, directed by Brett Piper
Version 2: the second cut called Dark Night, directed by Brett Piper
Version 3: the third cut called Raiders of the Living Dead, featuring new footage shot by Sherman

The film was released on DVD in the United Kingdom in 2003. This version features solely Raiders of the Living Dead and its commentary.
