= Tiger Shark (film) =

1932 film

- 1932 Theatrical Poster
- Directed by: Howard Hawks
- Screenplay by: Wells Root
- Story by: Houston Branch
- Produced by: Bryan Foy
- Starring: Edward G. Robinson; Richard Arlen; Zita Johann
- Cinematography: Tony Gaudio
- Edited by: Thomas Pratt
- Music by: Bernhard Kaun
- Production company: First National Pictures
- Distributed by: First National Pictures
- Release date: September 22, 1932 (U.S.)
- Running time: 77 minutes
- Country: United States
- Language: English
- Budget: $375,000
- Box office: $879,000

Tiger Shark is a 1932 American pre-Code melodrama romantic film directed by Howard Hawks and starring Edward G. Robinson, Richard Arlen and Zita Johann.

== Plot ==
The wife of one-handed tuna fisherman Mike Mascarenhas falls for the man whose life Mike had saved while at sea.

== Cast ==
- Edward G. Robinson as Mike Mascarenhas
- Richard Arlen as Pipes Boley
- Zita Johann as Quita Silva
- Leila Bennett as Muggsey, A Barber
- J. Carroll Naish as Tony
- Vince Barnett as Fishbone, A Crewman
- William Ricciardi as Manuel Silva, A Crewman
- Maurice Black as Jean Fernandez, a Shipwrecked Crewman
- Sheila Bromley as 'Red'
- Wong Chung as Chinese Laundryman
- Edwin Maxwell as Doctor
- Toshia Mori as Oriental Lady Barber
- Henry Otho as Crewman
- Inez Palange as Mike's Neighbor
- Pedro Regas as Crewman
- Joe Roig
- Hector V. Sarno as Crewman
- Harry Semels as Crewman
- Leo Sulky as Drinking Crewman

== Production notes ==
The film was made in the same year as Scarface, which is considered to be the Howard Hawks' best film of the early sound era. The general storyline was repeated several times in later films such as Manpower (1941) with Marlene Dietrich and George Raft, in which Robinson plays the same role but as a powerline worker.

John Lee Mahin worked on the script for the film uncredited.

The film's leading lady Zita Johann may be best remembered for her role in Karl Freund's The Mummy, also released in that same year, 1932.

== Box office ==
According to Warner Bros. records, the film earned $436,000 domestically and $443,000 foreign.
