= Elizabeth Gorcey =

American filmmaker

- Born: January 1, 1962 (age 64)
- Education: Monmouth University
- Occupations: Filmmaker, actress, writer
- Years active: 1984–present
- Website: www.elizabethgorcey.com

Elizabeth Gorcey (born January 1, 1962) is an American filmmaker, actress, and writer. She has held supporting roles in films such as Kidco and Footloose while also producing and directing films which include Just Another Man's Story and Breast Pump & Blender. She is also the author of the children's book series Liv on Life.

== Early life and education ==
Gorcey was raised in Long Branch, New Jersey and attended Long Branch High School. Her parents rented apartments and owned Gorcey's Plumbing and Heating. She was interested in acting at a young age, but began by focusing on painting and sculpting. She also sang with the Metropolitan Opera Company.

Gorcey graduated high school at the age of 16 and went on to the American Conservatory Theater on a summer scholarship. She attended the University of Arizona and Monmouth University. for one year each.

== Career ==
In her early career, Gorcey gave summer stock theater performances at The Barn Theatre in Michigan, including in the productions of "Carousel," "Damn Yankees" and "My Fair Lady." After her first year, she returned to New Jersey where she obtained her real estate license, returning the following summer for more acting.

Her first leading roles in film came as June Cessna in the film Kidco, and Wendy Jo in the 1984 film Footloose. She went on to act in films such as Teen Wolf and television shows such as Highway to Heaven.

Her acting led to a film career of directing and producing. She directed the 2012 documentary Adopting Ginny, and produced and directed the award-winning documentary Just Another Man's Story.

Outside of film, Gorcey is the author of the children's book series Liv on Life. The series was inspired by her daughter and grew into a lifestyle brand of products. She is also an artist and has conducted workshops as part of her charitable work.

== Filmography ==
=== Filmmaker ===
Year	Title	Writer	Producer	Director	Notes	Ref.
2004	Sweet Onion	No	Yes	No	Short film	
2005	Adopting Ginny	No	Yes	Yes	Documentary	
2007	Wedding Jimmy	No	Yes	No	Short film	
2008	Breast Pump & Blender	Yes	Yes	Yes	Short film	
2013	Just Another Man's Story	No	Yes	Yes	Short film	
2015	Quit	Yes	Yes	Yes	Short film	
2017	Radio Mary	No	Yes	No	Film	
2021	Peeling the Stinky Onion	No	Yes	Yes	Television film	

=== Acting ===
Year	Title	Role	Notes
1984	Footloose	Wendy Jo	
1984	Kidco	June Cessna	
1984	Grandview, U.S.A.	Bonnie Clark	
1985	Teen Wolf	Tina	
1986	Highway to Heaven	Andrea	
1987	Beauty and the Beast	Cozy	Episode: "No Way Down"
1987	The New Mike Hammer	Lisa	Episode: "Green Blizzard"
1989	Iced	Diane	
2012	The Improbable Journey of Berta Benz	Voice of Klara Benz	
2021	Peeling the Stinky Onion	Zelda Shapiro	

== Personal life ==
Gorcey is the second cousin to stage and film actor Leo Gorcey.
