= Dan Kennis =

American film producer

Daniel Q. Kennis (1917, New York City – May 19, 2006, Palo Alto, California) was an American B-movie producer.

== Filmography ==
- Angels' Wild Women (1972)
- I Spit on Your Corpse (1974)
- Naughty Stewardesses (1975)
- Cinderella 2000 (1977)
- Team-Mates (1978)
- Raiders of the Living Dead (1986)
- Alienator (1989)

He was also the production manager for Dracula vs. Frankenstein (1971).
