= Guy Endore =

American novelist

- Guy Endore (date unknown)
- Born: Samuel Goldstein; July 4, 1901; Brooklyn, New York, U.S.
- Died: February 12, 1970 (aged 68)
- Citizenship: American
- Education: Columbia University
- Occupations: Writer, screenwriter
- Writing career
- Pen name: Harry Relis
- Language: English
- Notable works: The Werewolf of Paris (1933); King of Paris : A Novel (1956)

Samuel Guy Endore (July 4, 1901 – February 12, 1970), born Samuel Goldstein and also known as Harry Relis, was an American novelist and screenwriter. During his career he produced a wide array of novels, screenplays, and pamphlets, both published and unpublished. A cult favorite of fans of horror, he is best known for his novel The Werewolf of Paris (1933), which occupies a significant position in werewolf literature, much in the same way that Dracula (1897) does for vampire literature. Endore is also known for his left-wing novel of the Haitian Revolution, Babouk: The Story of a Slave. He was nominated for a screenwriting Oscar for The Story of G.I. Joe (1945), and his novel Methinks the Lady . . . (1946) was the basis for Ben Hecht's screenplay for Whirlpool (1949).

== Early life and education ==
Endore was born Samuel Goldstein in Brooklyn, New York, to Isidor and Malka Halpern Goldstein. His father was a coal miner, inventor, and investor from Pittsburgh who often had difficulty making ends meet. His mother died by suicide when he was four, possibly due to the family's unstable and often insufficient livelihood. Isidor changed their name in an attempt to move beyond the events of the past, and he placed the children in a Methodist orphanage. During this time, Isidor sold an invention and dreamt that his dead wife willed the children to have a European education, so he sent them to Vienna with the newfound windfall. The children lived in Vienna for five years under the care of a Catholic governess, but when Isidor disappeared and their funds ran short, they returned to Pittsburgh and lived together.

While there Endore attended the Carnegie Technical Institute but would earn his B.A. (1923) and M.A. (1925), both in European languages, at Columbia University. According to his own account, he scraped together the money to attend, even renting out his bed to a wealthier student while he slept on the floor. He unsuccessfully pursued a PhD.

== Writer ==
Endore's first novel was The Man From Limbo (1930), about an impoverished college graduate obsessed with acquiring wealth; it was influenced by Robert Louis Stevenson.

His most famous work was The Werewolf of Paris (1933), a violent horror story set during the Franco-Prussian War and the Paris Commune and inspired by the work of Hanns Heinz Ewers, whom Endore had translated. The Werewolf of Paris is described by Brian Stableford as "entitled to be considered the werewolf novel". Endore also wrote what Stableford describes "a few notable horror stories", including "The Day of the Dragon" (1934), in which a scientific experiment returns dragons to the contemporary world and "Lazarus Returns"(1935), about a man who becomes possessed by the dybbuk of his uncle. Another important Endore tale was "Men of Iron" (1940).

After his work as a screenwriter, Endore published several other Freudian-tinged mysteries (Methinks the Lady..., Detour at Night) and also returned to his love of French history for biographical novels on Voltaire (Voltaire! Voltaire! [1961]), the Marquis de Sade (Satan's Saint [1965]) and Rousseau. His only other popular literary success came with King of Paris: A Novel (1956), based on the life of Alexandre Dumas. It became a best-seller and was a Book-of-the-Month Club choice.

== Hollywood ==
After graduating, Guy married Henrietta Portugal and in the 1930s they moved to Hollywood. Despite his eventual blacklisting, Endore had a fairly successful career in Hollywood, working on scripts or story ideas for big name pictures of the time. He made his name in the supernatural arena, with such movies as Mark of the Vampire and The Curse of the Werewolf (based on his novel The Werewolf of Paris). Although many of his films were at the time derided by critics, they have acquired a cult following in recent years.

Throughout his career Endore showed himself to be fascinated with hypnotism and the inability of characters to control their own actions, centering his stories on supernatural maladies such as lycanthropy and hypnosis. Mad Love, Peter Lorre’s American debut, an adaptation of Maurice Renard's novel Les Mains d'Orlac, involves a man who, after an accident, is fitted with the hands of a murderer which try to continue in their gruesome career. His novel Methinks The Lady..., which was made into a movie with Gene Tierney, centered around a woman affected by a quack hypnotist. Even his Fred Astaire and Ginger Rogers comedy, Carefree, still includes Rogers being put under hypnosis.

Endore began his movie writing career in 1935, when he wrote the story for Rumba, a star vehicle for George Raft and Carole Lombard, which was given a scathing review in The New York Times. He worked on the screenplay for Mark of the Vampire starring Bela Lugosi. He also wrote the 19-page treatment that eventually became The Raven, for which he was not credited. A number of other horror films followed, interspersed with more mainstream films, including the Oscar-nominated (The Story of G.I. Joe), a John Wayne movie (Lady from Louisiana), and Carefree. His Hollywood career ended in 1969 with a made-for-TV movie entitled Fear No Evil, for which he wrote the story. It was the first US television "Movie of the Week" and a success in the ratings, spawning a sequel a year later.

== Politics ==
While he attended Columbia, he was drawn to the political left by Whittaker Chambers, then a communist who was a fellow student, and by the harsh Great Depression world in which he lived. Endore would openly describe himself as opposed to capitalist class society and to imperialism, with what he believed were its racist foundations. While he lived in Hollywood, Endore was interviewed several times and wrote articles for multiple leftist publications, including Black and White, The New York Clipper and New Masses.

Endore was a member of the Communist Party in Hollywood and was investigated by the House Un-American Activities Committee during its search for Communist infiltration of the film industry. He was, however, never called to testify and did not spend any time in jail. Because of his Communist associations, some film studios blacklisted him and consequently he sold screenplays under the pseudonym Harry Relis, the name of a relative by marriage. However, he remained defiant, claiming that he was a failure as a human being if he was not subversive to everything that the HUAC stood for. After the release of Khrushchev's Secret Speech (1956) which confirmed the reality of Stalin's abuses, Endore abandoned the fight against the blacklist only a few years before the reinstatement of many leftist sympathizers in the film industry, which has cast him into obscurity among the more prominent pro-Communist writers.

Endore studied and was greatly inspired by Karl Marx. As Joseph Ramsey summarizes, he "called for 'a new school of Marxian historical fiction,' to be based in 'a study of original sources' so as 'to furnish reliable and powerful revolutionary weapons.'" Endore struggled, however, to produce significant works of leftist fiction and he often felt resigned to composing what he believed would sell, especially after the public failure of his anti-slavery novel Babouk, with its more explicitly sympathetic depiction of the Haitian Revolution. Endore retained his profound interest in historical subjects throughout his career.

He had strong related interests, intellectual and moral, in mysticism, yoga, vegetarianism, theosophy and anti-vivisectionism. In the "About the Author" section that concludes the 1941 Pocket Books edition of The Werewolf of Paris Endore describes himself as "to a large extent a vegetarian, a teetotaler, a non-smoker. In giving up, with occasional exceptions, the use of meat, liquor, and tobacco, I feel that I have added to the happiness I derive from living." He concludes, "In politics I tend toward communism and the establishment of the classless society."

== Activism ==
Two teenagers in 1943 wearing Zoot suits like associated with the Sleepy Lagoon case, precursor to the Zoot Suit riots (1943)

Although more famous for his fiction, Endore was a committed activist, attempting to protect with words those who were mistreated by the American culture and legal system and using literature to illuminate what he considered to be historical oversights. A fierce critic, like his friend Lillian Smith, of segregation and Jim Crow, Endore wrote pamphlets for many anti-racist causes, including "The Crime at Scottsboro" about the Scottsboro Boys and their subsequent trial.

In 1942 Endore involved himself deeply in the defense of those arrested in the "Sleepy Lagoon" case (also known as the "Chicano Scottsboro"), when seventeen Mexican teenagers were incarcerated for a murder. Although there was scant evidence, a complete lack of eyewitnesses and no murder weapon to be found, they were put away in a wave of hysteria spread through the newspapers of LA. Endore became involved when he looked into the case and was startled by the lack of evidence. He proceeded to write a pamphlet entitled The Sleepy Lagoon Mystery which went over in detail the mistakes and oversights involved in the case. Giving a speech on the Al Jarvis radio show, Endore referred to Sleepy Lagoon as "the name of a disgrace which should be on the conscience of every decent American – and especially every decent person who lives in Los Angeles – because we allowed it to happen here." To bring his readers over to his way of thinking Endore used scare tactics, threatening his readers that, should they allow this to happen, they could, in essence, be next. For the next year he corresponded often with the defense, gave interviews and spoke on radio shows in an attempt to help the teens. In the end his attempts were a success and, with the information exposed in his pamphlet and a change in common opinion, the verdict was reversed.

Endore supported non-governmental drug rehab programs and became a devoted proponent of the Synanon Foundation, a controversial southern California commune dedicated to reforming and rehabilitating drug addicts and alcoholics (later, as the Church of Synanon, it started its own utopian social movement). He composed pamphlets and a published history of the commune, Synanon. He also taught fiction writing at the Los Angeles People's Education Center, a CPUSA offshoot of the New York Workers School.

== Works ==
An except from Endore's The Crime at Scottsboro (1938) on the Scottsboro Boys case now appears on the Digital Public Library of America.

=== Literary work ===
Fiction literature:

- The Man from Limbo (New York: Farrar & Rinehart, 1930)
- The Werewolf of Paris (New York: Farrar & Rinehart, 1933) (New York: Pocket Books, 1941)
- Babouk, (New York: Vanguard Press, 1934) (Monthly Review: New York, 1991) foreword by Jamaica Kincaid, afterword by David Barry Gaspar and Michel-Rolph Trouillot
- Methinks the Lady... (New York: Duell, 1946) aka Nightmare (New York: Dell, 1956)
- Detour at Night (Simon & Schuster, 1958) also known as Detour Through Devon (London: Gollancz, 1959)

==== Tales ====
- The day of the dragon Collected in the anthology Alfred Hitchcock’s monster museum, Random House (1965)
- Lazarus Returns Collected in Dennis Wheatley, A century of horror, Londres Hutchinson.
- Men of Iron Collected in the anthology A decade of Fantasy and Science Fiction. Doubleday/SFBC. (1960).

==== Fictionalized biographies ====
- Casanova: His Known and Unknown Life (New York: John Day, 1929, biography)
- The Sword of God: Joan of Arc (Garden City Publishing Co.: New York, 1933 biography)
- King of Paris : A Novel (Book-of-the-Month Club selection) (New York: Simon & Schuster, 1956)
- Voltaire! Voltaire! : A Novel (New York: Simon & Schuster, 1961) also known as The Heart and the Mind (W. H. Allen, 1962)
- Satan's Saint: A Novel About the Marquis De Sade (New York: Crown, 1965)

==== Play ====
- Call Me Shakespeare: A Play in Two Acts (Dramatists Play Service, 1966)

==== Pamphlets ====
- The Crime at Scottsboro (Hollywood Scottsboro Committee, 1938)
- The Sleepy Lagoon Mystery (Sleepy Lagoon Defense Committee, 1944) another edition is The Sleepy Lagoon Mystery (R & E Research Associates, 1972)
- Synanon (New York: Doubleday, 1968)

Translations:

- Alraune by Hanns Heinz Ewers (John Day: New York, 1929)
- An Iceland Fisherman by Julien Viand (P. A. Norstedt, 1931)
- Alraune by Hanns H. Ewers, edited by R. Reginald and Douglas Menville (Arno, 1976)

== External sources ==
- "Endore, Samuel (Guy)." Dictionary of Literary Biography.
- Martin, Carl Grey. "Guy Endore's Dialectical Werewolf." Le Monde Diplomatique. September 15, 2014
- Ramsey, Joseph. "Guy Endore and the Ironies of Political Repression." Minnesota Review 70. Spring/Summer 2008: 141–51
- Wald, Alan. "The Subaltern Speaks." Monthly Review April 1992: 17–29
- The Guy Endore Papers 1925–1970
- S. Guy Endore at the Library of Congress, with 40 library catalog records
- Guy Endore at IMDb
- Guy Endore at the Internet Speculative Fiction Database
- A talk given by Guy Endore to a group of librarians
- "Guy Endore's Dialectical Werewolf" by Carl Grey Martin
- "Guy Endore and the Ironies of Political Repression" by Joseph G. Ramsey
