= The Werewolf of Paris =

1933 novel by Guy Endore

- Dust-jacket of 1st edition of The Werewolf of Paris
- Author: Guy Endore
- Language: English
- Genre: Gothic; horror; historical fiction
- Publisher: Farrar & Rinehart
- Publication date: 1933
- Publication place: United States
- Media type: Print (Hardback)
- Pages: 325

The Werewolf of Paris (1933) is a Gothic horror novel by American writer Guy Endore. The novel follows Bertrand Caillet, the eponymous werewolf, throughout the tumultuous events of the Franco-Prussian War and the Paris Commune of 1870–71. Some literature experts have compared this book with Dracula by Bram Stoker and they have identified it as the Dracula of werewolf fiction.

== Plot summary ==
Like much Gothic fiction, The Werewolf of Paris opens with a frame story in which the author explains his struggle with the fantastic elements of his tale. Here the narrator, an anonymous American working on his doctoral research in Paris, discovers a manuscript in the hands of some trash-pickers. He describes it as "the Galliez report: thirty four sheets of closely written French, an unsolicited defense of Sergeant Bertrand Caillet at the latter's court-martial in 1871."

A descendant of the cursed Pitamont clan, which destroyed itself in a long feud with the neighboring Pitavals, Bertrand is born one Christmas Eve to an adolescent girl who had been raped by a priest, Father Pitamont. Bertrand grows up with strange sadistic and sexual desires which are usually expressed as dreams. Sometimes the dreams are memories of actual experiences in which he had transformed into a wolf.

His step-uncle, Aymar Galliez, who raises the boy (along with his mother Josephine and a servant Françoise), soon learns of Bertrand's affliction. Bertrand flees to Paris after his assault on a prostitute, his incestuous union with his mother, and his murder of a friend in their home village. Aymar tries to find Bertrand by studying the details of local crimes, such as the mutilation of corpses and various murders.

Bertrand joins the National Guard during the Franco-Prussian War, doing little fighting and finding love from a girl who volunteers at a canteen, the beautiful and wealthy Sophie de Blumenberg. Sophie, a masochist and obsessed with death, helps Bertrand avoid the violent effects of his transformation by allowing him to cut into her flesh in order to suck her blood.

Aymar finds Bertrand in Paris during the Paris Commune, but thinking that love has cured Bertrand, he decides not to take action. Fearing that he'll accidentally kill Sophie, Bertrand goes out one night to feed on someone else. He is caught attacking a fellow soldier and arrested. Aymar supports burning Bertrand at the stake, and provides the court with a summary of Bertrand's crimes, but the court sentences him to treatment at the infirmary of La Santé prison.

Aymar transfers Bertrand to an asylum after the reactionary Versaillists have retaken Paris, with great loss of life among the Communards, who are executed en masse. Unbeknownst to Aymar, Bertrand suffers in a small cell, drugged when he is visited by his uncle. Bertrand eventually commits suicide by jumping from the building with another inmate whom he delusively believes is Sophie. Their deaths are similar to a suicide fantasy that Bertrand and Sophie enjoyed; the real Sophie had previously committed suicide on her own, unable to deal with her separation from Bertrand.

The narrative proper is followed by a grisly appendix citing a municipal report on the cemeteries of Paris. The report indicates that the grave of one "Sieur C ... (Bertrand)" contained the body "of a dog, which despite 8 years in the ground was still incompletely destroyed."

== Historical content ==
The Franco-Prussian War and the Paris Commune of 1870–71 provide the immediate backdrop to The Werewolf of Paris, although Endore also makes many references to the Revolutions of 1848, when Aymar was physically disabled and traumatized amid the intense street fighting in Paris. The novel is filled with allusions to notable historical figures including Bismarck, Blanqui, Courbet, Dumas, Haussmann, and Thiers.

Endore uses the werewolf narrative to depict and comment on the fervid political climate of France in the nineteenth century. More specifically, his narrator comments cynically on the confusions and mistakes of the Commune, but always in the context of the unsurpassed brutality of the capitalist system. In a characteristic passage referring to the bloody suppression of the Commune by the combined forces of capitalism and aristocracy, Endore's narrator points out that the "Commune shot fifty-seven from the prison of La Roquette. Versailles retaliated with nineteen hundred. To that comparison add this one. The whole famous Reign of Terror in fifteen months guillotined 2,596 aristos. The Versaillists executed 20,000 commoners before the firing squads in one week."

== Inspiration ==
The novel draws inspiration from the true story of the French sergeant, Francois Bertrand, infamous as "the necrophilic sergeant" or "the vampire of Montparnasse". Between 1848 and 1849, Bertrand experienced brutal fits that led to acts of necrophilia and cannibalism in several French cemeteries, particularly in Pere Lachaise and Montparnasse, both necropolises located in Paris. Bertrand was apprehended and faced trial in a court-martial conducted by the French authorities. The account of Francois Bertrand's actions was chronicled in the treatise titled The Book of the Werewolves by the English scholar Sabine Baring-Gould, published in the year 1865.

== Reception ==
The Werewolf of Paris was a #1 New York Times bestseller upon publication. The thriller went through numerous printings of the clothbound first edition (pictured above right), now increasingly rare. It is rumored that Endore, suffering under the impact of the Great Depression, sold the manuscript outright to Farrar & Rinehart for a flat fee, thus receiving no additional royalties from its subsequent success. Given that Endore's next novel, Babouk (1934), was published by the leftist Vanguard Press, this story could have merit, although that work's revolutionary Haitian subject matter might simply have proven too controversial for Farrar & Rinehart.

Anthony Boucher and J. Francis McComas, notable sci-fi and mystery writers in the 1940s and 1950s, described The Werewolf of Paris as a "superb blend of fantasy and psycho-pathology and history." Robert Bloch included The Werewolf of Paris on his list of favourite horror novels. Basil Copper described The Werewolf of Paris as "a well-written work of literature, as well as an exciting and carefully observed clinical study." More recently, Brian Stableford praised the book as "entitled to be considered the werewolf novel." In addition the Belgian writer, traslator, critic and demonologist Jacques Finné, in his introduction to the 1987 version of The Werewolf of Paris, commented "The Werewolf of Paris is to lycanthropic literature what Dracula of Bram Stoker is to vampirism: a classic."

== Film adaptations ==
Despite the fact that Endore worked for Universal Studios, The Werewolf of Paris served as the basis for neither Werewolf of London (1935) nor The Wolf Man (1941). Hammer Film Productions' The Curse of the Werewolf (1961) was the first adaptation of the story, although now set in eighteen-century Spain, with little of the novel's political content. Legend of the Werewolf (1975), set in nineteenth-century Paris, reflects aspects of the novel, but Endore is not credited. Even so, like Endore's fiction Legend of the Werewolf is sensitive to the hardships of the working classes and other victims (human and non-human) of social hierarchy.

== Sources ==
- Bleiler, Everett (1948). The Checklist of Fantastic Literature. Chicago: Shasta Publishers. p. 109.
