= The Curse of the Werewolf =

1961 film directed by Terence Fisher

- UK theatrical release poster
- Directed by: Terence Fisher
- Written by: John Elder
- Based on: The Werewolf of Paris by Guy Endore
- Produced by: Anthony Hinds
- Starring: Clifford Evans; Oliver Reed; Yvonne Romain; Catherine Feller
- Cinematography: Arthur Grant
- Edited by: Alfred Cox
- Music by: Benjamin Frankel
- Production company: Hammer Film Productions
- Distributed by: Rank Film Distributors (UK)
- Release date: 1 May 1961 (UK)
- Running time: 88 minutes
- Country: United Kingdom
- Language: English

The Curse of the Werewolf is a 1961 British horror film from Hammer Film Productions. It is directed by Terence Fisher from a screenplay by producer Anthony Hinds (under the pen name 'John Elder'), and features Oliver Reed in his first leading film role. Clifford Evans, Yvonne Romain, and Catherine Feller also star. It is loosely based on Guy Endore's 1933 novel The Werewolf of Paris.

Unlike Hammer’s previous horror films Frankenstein, Dracula, and The Mummy, the film was not successful at the box office, making it the only werewolf film for Hammer. The Curse of the Werewolf is notable as the first werewolf film to be shot in colour.

== Plot ==
A beggar in 18th-century Spain is imprisoned by the cruel marqués Siniestro after making an inappropriate remark at the nobleman's wedding feast. The beggar is forgotten, and his sole human contact is with the jailer and his mute daughter. Lonely after having driven away his wife with his violent temper, the aging marqués makes advances on the jailer's daughter while she is cleaning his room. When she refuses him, the marqués has her thrown into the beggar's cell. The beggar, driven mad by his long confinement and sporting wolf fur over most of his body, rapes her and then dies.

The jailer's daughter is released the next day and brought to the marqués. She kills the marqués and flees. She is found in the forest by the gentleman-scholar Don Alfredo Corledo, who lives alone with his housekeeper Teresa. Teresa is unable to treat her ailment, and the jailer's daughter dies after giving birth on Christmas Day.

Alfredo and Teresa raise the baby, whom they name Leon. Leon, cursed by the circumstances of his conception and by his Christmas Day birth, is a werewolf. A number of goats are found dead, their throats torn out, and Pepe Valiente, the watchman, fires a shot at what he believes to be a wolf. The next morning Teresa extracts a bullet from Leon, but he denies having gone out, having no memory of his doings as a werewolf. However, when Alfredo presses him, he recounts how on his first hunting trip he started licking a dead squirrel out of compassion and found he had a taste for blood.

Alfredo consults his priest, who concludes that Leon is a werewolf due to an evil spirit that has been with him since birth. Only by Leon loving others and being loved in return can the spirit be kept at bay. Alfredo resolves to give Leon all the love he needs, and installs steel bars on Leon's bedroom window to keep him from getting out again. The werewolf transformations cease, and a herder Dominique's dog is blamed for the earlier killings.

Thirteen years later, Leon leaves home to seek work at the Gomez vineyard. The vintner, Don Fernando, sets Leon to work in the wine cellar with Jose Amadeo, who becomes Leon's friend. Leon falls in love with Fernando's daughter, Cristina, who is betrothed to a nobleman. He carries on a love affair with her and attempts to persuade her to elope with him, but unwilling to leave her home, she refuses him. Despondent, Leon goes with Jose to a nearby brothel. He transforms and kills Vera, one of the girls, and Jose, before returning to Alfredo's house.

Alfredo and the priest fill Leon in on his werewolf nature. Certain that Cristina's love can prevent his transformation, he makes a last appeal for her to elope with him, and this time she agrees. While Cristina is packing, Leon is arrested on suspicion of murder due to his clothes having been found at the scene. He begs to be released and entrusted to the care of a monastery before he changes again, but the mayor Don Enrique does not believe him after Cristina fails to corroborate his story, not having been told he is a werewolf. Giving up hope, Leon urges Alfredo to use the silver bullet which Pepe made from a crucifix blessed by an archbishop in response to his childhood killings. His wolf nature rising to the surface, he breaks out of his cell, killing an old soak and the gaoler. The local people pursue Leon with torches but are unable to bring him down. Though torn with grief, Alfredo loads the silver bullet, shoots Leon dead, and tearfully covers his body with a cloak.

== Cast ==
- Clifford Evans as Don Alfredo Corledo
- Oliver Reed as Leon Corledo
  - Justin Walters as young Leon Corledo
- Yvonne Romain as servant girl
  - Loraine Carvana as young servant Girl
- Catherine Feller as Cristina Fernando
- Anthony Dawson as Marques Siniestro
- Josephine Llewelyn as Marquesa Siniestro
- Richard Wordsworth as beggar
- Hira Talfrey as Teresa
- John Gabriel as priest
- Warren Mitchell as Pepe Valiente
- Anne Blake as Rosa Valiente
- George Woodbridge as Dominique
- Michael Ripper as old soak
- Ewen Solon as Don Fernando
- Peter Sallis as Don Enrique
- Martin Matthews as Jose Amadeo
- David Conville as Rico Gomez
- Denis Shaw as gaoler
- Sheila Brennan as Vera
- Joy Webster as Isabel
- Renny Lister as Yvonne
- Charles Lamb as Marques' chef
- Desmond Llewelyn as Marques's footman

== Production ==
The film was shot at Bray Studios in Berkshire on sets that were constructed in 1960 for a proposed Spanish Inquisition film, The Rape of Sabena, which was shelved after the BBFC objected to the script. While Guy Endore's original novel took place in Paris, the location of the film was moved to Spain to avoid building new sets.

Roy Ashton was the makeup designer, Les Bowie was the special effects designer, Bernard Robinson was the production designer, and Thomas Goswell was the art director.

Composer Benjamin Frankel's score is notable for its use of twelve-tone serialism, rare in film music.

== Release ==
The Curse of the Werewolf was released in May 1961 on a double feature bill with Shadow of the Cat (1961), another Hammer film. Upon its initial release, the film was heavily censored in the UK, and a restored print was first aired on the BBC in 1993. While a premiere TV screening of the restored print had been planned to air on BBC2 on 31 October 1992, during the Vault of Horror all-night marathon hosted by Dr. Walpurgis (played by Guy Henry; later named Dr. Terror), the censored version was aired by mistake.

=== Home media ===
In North America, the film was released on 6 September 2005 alongside seven other Hammer horror films on the 4-DVD set The Hammer Horror Series (ASIN: B0009X770O), which is part of MCA-Universal's Franchise Collection. This set was re-released on Blu-ray on 13 September 2016. The film received an individual release with a new 4K scan in April 2020. The new release included a new commentary track by Steven Haberman, a featurette on the making of the film, make up artist Roy Ashton, "Lycanthrophy: The Beast in All of Us" and stills from the film. Furthermore, in some versions of the video, the mute girl (Yvonne Romain)'s father is the beggar (Richard Wordsworth) himself.

== Critical reception ==
Howard Thompson of The New York Times wrote that some of the colour photography was "beautiful", adding that "for a werewolf yarn this Hammer Production has a Gothic type of narrative that is not uninteresting, if broadly acted".

Harrison's Reports graded the film as "good," finding the production values "a big asset" although the review felt there was "not enough action".

Variety called it "an outstanding entry of the horror picture genre. Although not a particularly frightening or novel story treatment of the perennial shock film topic (werewolves ranking second only to vampires in cinema), it is a first-class effort in other respects".

The Monthly Film Bulletin wrote: "Even by Hammer standards, this is a singularly repellent job of slaughter-house horror... Surely the time has come when a film like this should be turned over to the alienists for comment; as entertainment its stolid acting, writing, presentation and direction could hardly be more preclusive".

== Comic ==
The film was adapted into a 15-page comic strip for the January 1978 issue of the magazine The House of Hammer (volume 1, # 10, published by General Book Distribution). It was drawn by John Bolton from a script by Steve Moore. The cover of the issue featured a painting by Brian Lewis as Leon in human and werewolf forms.
