= Babouk =

1934 novel by Guy Endore

- First edition
- Author: Guy Endore
- Language: English
- Genre: Political novel
- Published: 1934 Vanguard Press
- Publication place: United States
- Pages: 182
- Preceded by: The Werewolf of Paris
- Followed by: Methinks the Lady

Babouk is a political-themed novel by Guy Endore, a fictionalized account of the Haitian Revolution told through the eyes of its titular slave. Though virtually unknown today, Babouk has gained some notoriety among scholars for linking the slave trade with capitalism. A committed leftist and opponent of racism, Endore spent many months in Haiti researching the story that would become Babouk, and much of his findings make their way into the text, either in the form of epigraphs or explicitly noted in the text itself. Babouk is also notable for the digressions the narrator makes from the main narrative, to expound his political sympathies.

== Background ==
Endore, a popular writer and staunch socialist, had in 1933 published his book The Werewolf of Paris, which became a financial success. Hoping to profit on his newfound bankability, he was contracted by Simon & Schuster to write another novel that would be in the same mystery vein. Endore, who spoke French, decided to write a romance set against the backdrop of the Haitian Revolution, and went to Haiti to conduct research on the slave trade. Horrified by what he learned, he became particularly interested in the story of a rebellious slave named Dutty Boukman, who many consider to be the catalyst behind the Haitian slave rebellion. Endore created a fictionalized version named Babouk, but he also used his story to try to tell an anti-capitalist parable that borrowed much of its philosophy from Karl Marx. The resulting manuscript was dubbed by the publishing house of Simon and Schuster to be, "a powerful, moving piece of work. It won't sell because it's just too horrible." The book was not successful, and it languished in obscurity until it was chosen by the leftist journal Monthly Review to be published as part of its "Voices of Resistance" series. The republished novel included a foreword by writer Jamaica Kincaid and an afterword by historians David Barry Gaspar and Michel-Rolph Trouillot. It was published in 1991 by Monthly Review Press.

== Plot summary ==
Babouk is a slave renowned by many tribes for his excellent storytelling abilities. He is captured by the French and taken to Saint Domingue to work on the sugar cane fields. Unaware of the reasons for his capture and hoping to be reunited with his lost love Niati, Babouk escapes his slave compound and wanders into the forest, only to meet some indigenous Americans. He is soon captured by a group of runaway slaves who had agreed to turn in other runaways on the condition that they are allowed their freedom and returned to the compound, where his ear is cut off. Such a traumatic experience forces him to remain absolutely silent for several years, doing his labor without complaint but also without much energy. Eventually, he can no longer maintain his silence, and he re-establishes himself as a great storyteller. Unhappy with the way the slave masters treat him (although they claim otherwise), Babouk becomes the figurehead for a group of slaves that intend to revolt against their masters. Babouk and his group are initially successful in their endeavors, but are eventually held back by the might of the French military. Babouk's arm is severed after he tries to stop a cannon from firing by sticking his hand into it; he is then beheaded and his head is put on a pike as a warning to other slaves who might try to draw inspiration from Babouk. The novel ends with an impassioned statement from Endore that warns of the inevitability of a race war as the result of the white man's transgressions.

== Major themes ==
Babouk explicitly highlights the supposed relationship between the slave trade and capitalism. Endore often removes himself from the principal narrative involving Babouk in order to talk about certain historical accounts he researched for the book itself, and he liberally passes severe judgment over those who were either involved in the slave trade or, more controversially, those whom he supposed passively continued its existence by not questioning the capitalist system. Endore also makes the point of comparing racist practices of the eighteenth century with contemporary ones, and rejects the notion that men are treated equally in the United States, even if that is what the Constitution claims. Babouk's narrative voice is also heavily infused with irony, often taking the side of the slave masters or pro-slavery ideologues in an effort to further highlight what he sees as the absurdity of their position. He also openly mocks the production of what he believes to be useless objects to project status, such as jewelry.

== Critical reception ==
The handful of critics who reviewed Babouk gave it lukewarm reviews at the time of its 1934 release, recoiling at its brazenness and unflattering portrayal of whites, even from sources normally sympathetic to the anti-slavery part of his message. Generally, book critics agreed that Babouk's story had "epic possibilities" that did not reach fruition. The New Republic wrote, "'Babouk' is a horrible and an unforgettable book, but it somehow misses being a great, tragic or memorable one." The Nation declared that "The book is full...of interesting facts, observations, and descriptions. But...the denunciation of capitalism as slavery...is bad writing, almost fake poetry." Paul Allen authored the harshest review when he rejected the linkage of the voluntary exchange of capitalism and the forced labor of slavery, and wrote: "the heavy irony and the strident shrieking about the brotherhood of man culminating, on the last two pages of the book, in gibberish and exclamation points, practically ruins the book as either literature or propaganda."

A review in the NAACP house organ The Crisis lauded Babouk, stating "Here is a book that should be in the bookcase of every Negro family...speaking through Babouk, and seeing through the slaves' eyes, the author punctures all the cruelty, greed, pomp and vainglory of whites with deadly rapier thrusts".

Recent evaluations of the book have been more favorable, and have brought the once-obscure book to wider attention. In 1991, it was reprinted with a foreword by renowned Caribbean-American author Jamaica Kincaid, and has received scholarly treatment in anthologies and literary criticism.

== Film, TV or theatrical adaptations ==
- Actor Paul Robeson tried to make a radio drama out of Babouk, but he was not successful.
- A 30-minute radio adaption of Babouk was broadcast on June 27, 1937, as part of the Columbia Workshop series on WCBS (AM). It was adapted by Lester Fuller and was produced and directed by Edward A. Blatt and Irving Reis with incidental music by Bernard Herrmann.

== Publication history ==
- 1934, US, ISBN 0-85345-759-X
