= Quatermass (disambiguation) =

Quatermass is the surname of the title character of a British science fiction franchise of several television serials and films, and a radio production. Other notable uses of the word were inspired by this franchise.

Quatermass may also refer to:

== Quatermass franchise ==
Professor Bernard Quatermass is a fictional scientist created by the writer Nigel Kneale, who appeared in several British dramatized productions:

=== Television serials ===
- The Quatermass Experiment, a 1953 British six-part television serial that aired on BBC Television
- Quatermass II, a 1955 British six-part television serial that aired on BBC Television, and which serves as a sequel to the 1953 series
- Quatermass and the Pit, a 1958–1959 British six-part television serial that aired on BBC Television, and which served as the third and final installment of the original series
- Quatermass (TV serial), a 1979 British four-part TV series that aired on ITV, and was also distributed internationally as a film titled The Quatermass Conclusion or Quatermass IV
- The Quatermass Experiment (film), a 2005 British live-broadcast television film remake of the original 1953 serial that aired on BBC Four

=== Films ===
- The Quatermass Xperiment (Hammer Film Productions, 1955), released in the United States as The Creeping Unknown or Shock!!
- Quatermass 2 (Hammer Film Productions, 1957), released in the United States as The Enemy from Space
- Quatermass and the Pit (film) (Hammer Film Productions, 1967), released in the United States as Five Million Years to Earth

=== Radio ===
- The Quatermass Memoirs (BBC Radio 3, 1996), a British radio drama-documentary

== Other uses ==
- Quatermass (band), a British band
  - Quatermass (album), their self-titled album
- Martin Quatermass, a pseudonym used by film director John Carpenter as writer of the screenplay for the film Prince of Darkness
