= List of science fiction television programs, Q =

This is an inclusive list of science fiction television programs whose names begin with the letter Q.

== Q ==
Live-action

- Q.E.D. (1982)
- Quantum Leap (franchise):
  - Quantum Leap (1989–1993)
  - Quantum Leap (2022–2024)
- Quark (1977–1978)
- Quatermass (franchise):
  - Quatermass (1979, UK)
  - Quatermass and the Pit (1958–1959, UK)
  - Quatermass II (1955, UK)
  - Quatermass Experiment, The (1953, UK)
  - Quatermass Experiment, The (2005, UK, 1953 Quatermass Experiment, The remake)
- Questor Tapes, The (1974, film)
