= The Quatermass Memoirs =

British radio drama-documentary

- Cover of the CD release
- Genre: Drama-documentary; Science fiction
- Running time: c. 20 minute episodes
- Country of origin: United Kingdom
- Home station: BBC Radio 3
- Starring: Andrew Keir; Emma Gregory; Zulema Dene
- Written by: Nigel Kneale
- Produced by: Paul Quinn
- Original release: 4 – 8 March 1996
- No. of episodes: 5
- Audio format: Stereo
- Opening theme: "Mars, Bringer of War" by Gustav Holst

The Quatermass Memoirs is a British radio drama-documentary, originally broadcast in 5 episodes on BBC Radio 3 in March 1996. Written by Nigel Kneale, it was born out of his Quatermass series of films and television serials, which had first been broadcast in the 1950s. The idea for the show appeared as BBC radio intended to create a season of programming looking back at the 1950s, and it was the final piece of writing Kneale completed relating to the character.

The show is centered on the character of Professor Bernard Quatermass who, albeit older than in the previous series, is "the same very concerned scientist" but worried about his previous decisions. Andrew Keir, who had played Quatermass in the 1967 film Quatermass and the Pit, was chosen to voice the character. Later, Nigel Kneale himself became dismissive of the serial, but critics gave the production relatively positive reviews.

== Overview ==
The series mixes three different strands: a new monologue by Kneale in which he discusses the genesis and development of the Quatermass serials and their main character; archival material from the television productions, and from documentary and newsreel coverage of key events of the times in which they were made, such as the Cold War, the advent of nuclear weapons and the embryonic Space Race; and the dramatised strand, in which the Professor discloses his reasons for reclusion and discusses his demons with a persistent reporter who invades his hermitage (and ultimately becomes his friend). This third element is set several years after the events of the third serial, Quatermass and the Pit (1958–59), and shortly before those of the fourth and final serial, Quatermass (1979). Continuity is maintained with the 1979 serial by presenting Quatermass living in seclusion in the Scottish Highlands, while the final episode reveals that the social collapse foreshadowing the events of the final story has already begun.

== Production ==
Kneale had brought Quatermass's story to a close in the 1979 serial Quatermass, and for many years saw no reason to revisit the character. However, in 1995 he was approached by BBC Radio producer Paul Quinn with an idea for creating a drama-documentary about the character as part of a season of BBC radio programming looking back at the 1950s. Quinn told Dreamwatch magazine: "For many people who remember the seminal experience of hiding behind the sofa when the Quatermass serials came on the television, Quatermass was the 1950s. His adventures [...] have gone down in popular cultural history". Kneale was intrigued by the idea, and agreed to write new dramatic material of Quatermass relating his memories which Quinn could then combine with archive clips from the existing episodes of the various Quatermass television serials. Kneale saw the older Quatermass of this new serial as "the same very concerned scientist who is now, in retrospect, horribly worried about what he may have done to the world through his encounters with various lifeforms that were better not contacted". It was Kneale's first radio work since he had written the play You Must Listen for the BBC in 1952, and his first work for the BBC in any medium since the mid-1970s.

The programme was commissioned in July 1995, with the original working title of Quatermass and the Ultimate Conspiracy. When Quinn discovered that some of the soundtracks of the Quatermass episodes were considered to be of too poor a quality to use, the idea for the series was re-shaped to add the new elements of Kneale's monologue and archive news reports. Kneale, however, later denied that any of the news stories which The Quatermass Memoirs suggested had inspired parts of his work had ever been in his mind at the time. He said that he had used a degree of creative licence when "explaining" these apparent inspirations in his monologue sections.

A further problem for Quinn was that none of the actors who had played Quatermass for BBC Television in the 1950s were still alive. This was solved by employing Andrew Keir, who had played Quatermass in the Hammer Film Productions version of Quatermass and the Pit in 1967, a performance which Kneale had liked. Keir was happy to take the part, but somewhat concerned about only being used as a "link man" and not in a fully dramatic role. The clips that were used from the original BBC episodes were all carefully edited so that the actors playing Quatermass were never heard, and thus the differences between their voices and Keir's would not confuse the audience. Also in the cast were Emma Gregory as the journalist, Mandy, and Zulema Dene as Quatermass's housekeeper, Maire.

The five episodes, each of approximately twenty minutes, were broadcast across one week from 4 to 8 March 1996, as part of The Fifties season of programming. The serial was promoted in listings magazine Radio Times with an article by Kneale about Quatermass and his opinion of other science fiction programmes. Episode one was transmitted at 10.32pm on the Monday (originally scheduled for 10.05pm but delayed by a live concert broadcast beforehand); episode two at 9.30pm on the Tuesday; episode three 9.00pm on Wednesday, episode four 10.15pm on Thursday and episode five at 9.40pm on the Friday. The production was made and transmitted in stereo. It was Andrew Keir's final professional performance; he died the following year.

The digital radio station BBC7 repeated the series on several occasions from October 2003. In 2006 it was released on CD by BBC Audio as part of their Classic Radio Sci-Fi range, with cover artwork by Chris Achilleos.

== Reception ==
Nigel Kneale himself was largely dismissive of the serial in the years following its broadcast: "God knows it wasn't a very important sort of thing. The BBC didn't care tuppence about what they were doing, because they really don't know what they're doing, certainly not in radio... [Andrew Keir] must have been pretty ill when this nonsense was going on".

Reviewing the first episodes of both The Quatermass Memoirs and In the Fifties—another programme running as part of The Fifties season—The Times's reviewer Peter Barnard was impressed. Despite thinking that such a season of programming was "a necessarily premature commemoration", he felt that both series had "demonstrated how radio's better moments often take conventional pegs and hang some original clothing on them".

The Independent's radio critic Robert Hanks was unimpressed with Kneale's script for the dramatic sections, but praised the performance of Andrew Keir in the title role: "Lesser actors would treat Kneale's downbeat script with a certain detachment, but Keir is prepared to charge even the most banal lines with a terror that's both a treat and a lesson". Hanks also felt that The Fifties season as a whole, as demonstrated by The Quatermass Memoirs, had a somewhat misleading focus: "You get the sense that a vogue for science fiction is being interpreted as the spirit of the Fifties, with emphasis being put on a handful of sci-fi films. If you really wanted to read the age through its movies, you'd have to include Dean Martin and Jerry Lewis, late Ealing and early Norman Wisdom, Marilyn Monroe and Elvis Presley. It's a lot to accommodate; perhaps sticking to terror is just less intimidating".
