= X the Unknown =

1956 film directed by Leslie Norman

- Theatrical release poster
- Directed by: Leslie Norman
- Written by: Jimmy Sangster
- Produced by: Anthony Hinds
- Starring: Dean Jagger; Edward Chapman; Leo McKern
- Cinematography: Gerald Gibbs
- Edited by: James Needs
- Music by: James Bernard
- Production company: Hammer Film Productions
- Distributed by: Exclusive Films (UK)
- Release dates: 21 September 1956 (London, premiere); 5 November 1956 (UK)
- Running time: 78 minutes
- Country: United Kingdom
- Language: English
- Budget: $60,000 (US)

X the Unknown is a 1956 British science-fiction horror film from Hammer Film Productions, directed by Leslie Norman and starring Dean Jagger, Leo McKern and Edward Chapman. The screenplay was written by Jimmy Sangster, his first for a feature film. In the film, a group of scientists and military personnel investigate a mysterious series of deaths by radiation exposure in rural Scotland.

The film was originally conceived as a sequel to The Quatermass Xperiment (1955), but writer Nigel Kneale refused to let the character Bernard Quatermass be used, so the film was retooled into a standalone project. Original director Joseph Losey was replaced before filming began, purportedly due to disagreements with lead actor Jagger.

X the Unknown was significant in that "it firmly established Hammer's transition from B-movie thrillers to out-and-out horror/science fiction" and, with The Quatermass Xperiment (1955) and Quatermass 2 (1957), completes "an important trilogy containing relevant allegorical threads revealing Cold War anxieties and a diminishing national identity resulting from Britain's decrease in status as a world power".

As with Quatermass, Hammer played up the film's X Certificate in their advertising. The film premiered at the London Pavilion on 21 September, 1956. In the UK, the film was released on a double bill with Les Diaboliques. It was released in the United States on 2 May, 1957, on a double feature with The Curse of Frankenstein.

== Plot ==
In a deserted field in rural Scotland, soldiers take turns familiarising themselves with how to use a Geiger counter when an explosion occurs. One soldier dies of radiation exposure while another is badly burned. At the site, there is a Y-shaped crack in the ground with no apparent bottom. Dr. Adam Royston of the Atomic Energy Laboratory is called in to investigate. He is joined by "Mac" McGill, the security director for the UK Atomic Energy Commission.

A local boy is found dead with severe radiation burns. Royston investigates and comes upon a tower occupied by an old man in possession of a canister left over from previous radiation experiments. In a local hospital, a young doctor collapses and melts. The same evening, two soldiers mysteriously die while guarding the Y-shaped crack.

Royston's colleague Peter Elliott volunteers to be lowered into the pit to investigate. He encounters a terrifying unseen presence, but is pulled out of the pit in the nick of time. The army uses flamethrowers to try to kill the unseen creature but to no avail. Royston hypothesizes an explanation for the phenomenon. His theory involves a form of life that existed in distant past when the Earth's surface was largely molten. This entity had been trapped by the crust of the Earth as it cooled. But every 50 years there is a tidal surge that these creatures feel, causing them to reach the surface and find "food" in the form of radioactive sources.

The creature is finally revealed: an ever-growing blob, now crawling its way toward the Atomic Energy Laboratory to feed on cobalt being used there. Royston and McGill accurately predict its movement. They proceed to a location where they set up two large "scanners" on lorries and a canister of cobalt as bait. Peter drives the bait by jeep, drawing the blob's deadly attention. Eventually, the creature is neutralized and explodes. But as the team approaches the crack from which the monster had emerged, a second, more powerful explosion occurs, knocking several off their feet. Puzzled, the team continues approaching the crack, presumably to make further tests.

== Cast ==
- Dean Jagger as Dr. Adam Royston
- Leo McKern as "Mac" McGill
- Edward Chapman as John Elliott
- William Lucas as Peter Elliott
- Peter Hammond as Lt. Bannerman
- Anthony Newley as Lance Cpl. "Spider" Webb
- Ian MacNaughton as Haggis
- Michael Ripper as Sgt. Harry Grimsdyke
- Michael Brooke as Willie Harding
- Frazer Hines as Ian Osborne
- Norman MacOwan as Old Tom
- John Harvey as Maj. Cartwright
- Edwin Richfield as Kramer
- Jane Aird as Vi Harding
- Neil Hallett as Unwin
- Kenneth Cope as Pvt. Lansing
- Jameson Clark as Jack Harding
- Marianne Brauns as Zena, the nurse
- Brown Derby as the vicar
- Anthony Sagar as security man
- Edward Judd as soldier

== Production ==
The film was originally intended by Hammer to be a sequel to the previous year's successful The Quatermass Xperiment, but writer Nigel Kneale refused permission for the character of Bernard Quatermass to be used.

The original director of the film was supposed to be Joseph Losey, working under the name Joseph Walton – Losey was an American director who had moved to the UK after being placed on the Hollywood blacklist. Although Losey did begin pre-production on the film (casting the actors and building a number of sets), he was early on replaced by Leslie Norman purportedly due to illness. However, multiple sources claim that the real reason was that Dean Jagger refused to work with Losey because of his blacklisting. Losey would later direct The Damned (1962) for Hammer.

Norman was borrowed from Ealing. He had just made his directorial debut with The Night My Number Came Up (1955). He later said "I hated working at Hammer ... because I never got on with [Producer] Anthony Hinds." Cameraman Len Harris said none of the cast or crew liked working with Norman, because he was harsh with everyone (using abusive language) and always complaining.

The film's special effects were handled by Les Bowie and Jack Curtis, Bernard Robinson and Jimmy Sangster were production designers, Chris Sutton was assistant director and Phil Leakey did makeup.

Filming took place at Bray Studios in Berkshire, the Beaconsfield Gravel Pits and Gerrard's Cross. Half the film's budget was provided by Sol Lesser, a producer for RKO Pictures. This amount, $30,000, went towards the salary for Dean Jagger. Nonetheless, the American distribution deal between Hammer and RKO fell through due to the latter company's pending demise, and the film was eventually distributed in the U.S. by Warner Bros. Pictures.

== Critical reception ==
Monthly Film Bulletin wrote: "X the Unknown intriguingly suggests a new addition to the science fiction repertoire of Things, but after a series of prolonged climaxes, with its potential victims staring directly into the camera and shaking with fright, the "Unknown" finally emerges as a type of rolling rubber mattress, disappointingly unhorrific in content and appearance. Scientific explanations for the object's arrival are disconcertingly vague; one is left with the impression that the "Unknown" has been created with the sole purpose of manoeuvring its elaborate destruction, and the script sometimes suggests this in a number of unintentionally comic lines. It seems likely, therefore, that enthusiasts may find the present adventure rather tame when compared with the more grisly experiments of Professor Quatermass."

Variety reviewed the film twice. The first reviewer, "Myro", wrote in 1956:

X the Unknown is a highly imaginative and fanciful meller, with tense dramatic overtones which will help it along at the boxoffice. ... Made with creditable slickness, it tells a story which is completely absorbing, though totally unbelievable. There's little let-up in the action, and suspense angles are kept constantly to the forefront. Laboratory experiments in an atomic research station have an impressive, but familiar appeal, though ultimately they play a key role in the plot. War Office cooperated in the production, and its seal on a story of this kind should have some value. ... The scenes on the desolate moor, the sight of the grim atomic mass moving relentlessly towards its main target, the closeups of the radio-active victims, and the ultimate efficacy of the neutralizer combine in achieving a tense, almost horrific atmosphere. The acting, though mainly stereotype in style, is in the same vein, with Jagger, Edward Chapman and Leo McKern leading a vigorous cast. Marianne Brauns does a standout bit as the nurse, revealing a warm pert personality."

The next reviewer, "Whit", said the following year: "Poor and complicated science-fictioner not for discriminating audiences. ... This picture carries a complicated structure difficult to follow. The 'unknown' that serves as the menace in [this] science-fiction yarn is so vague that audiences may be overmystified. ...Roles are strictly static and Leslie Norman's direction isn't able to rise above what was handed him."

Films and Filming called the film "a welcomed change from interplanetary yarns."

== See also ==
- The Blob
