= Quatermass 2 =

1957 British film by Val Guest

- UK double crown release poster
- Directed by: Val Guest
- Screenplay by: Nigel Kneale; Val Guest
- Based on: Quatermass II (1955 TV serial) by Nigel Kneale
- Produced by: Anthony Hinds
- Starring: Brian Donlevy; Sid James; John Longden; Bryan Forbes; Vera Day; William Franklyn
- Cinematography: Gerald Gibbs
- Edited by: James Needs
- Music by: James Bernard
- Production company: Hammer Film Productions
- Distributed by: Exclusive Films (UK)
- Release date: 17 June 1957 (UK)
- Running time: 85 minutes
- Country: United Kingdom
- Language: English
- Budget: £92,000 or £117,731

Quatermass 2 (stylized as Quatermass II, released as Enemy From Space in the United States and Canada) is a 1957 British science-fiction horror film from Hammer Film Productions. It is directed and co-written by Val Guest, produced by Anthony Hinds, and stars Brian Donlevy with co-stars John Longden, Sid James, Bryan Forbes, Vera Day, and William Franklyn. It is a sequel to Hammer's earlier film The Quatermass Xperiment (1955). Like its predecessor, it is based on the 1955 BBC Television serial Quatermass II written by Nigel Kneale. Donlevy reprises his role as the eponymous Professor Bernard Quatermass, making him the only actor to play the character twice onscreen.

The film's story concerns Quatermass's investigation of reports of hundreds of meteorites landing only in the Winnerden Flats area of the UK. His inquiries lead him to a huge industrial complex, strikingly similar to his own plans for a Moon colony. This top-secret facility is in fact the centre of a conspiracy involving the alien infiltration of the highest echelons of the British Government. Quatermass and his allies must now do whatever is necessary to defeat the alien threat before it is too late.

The film was released in the United Kingdom on June 17, 1957. Like its predecessor, it was a commercial success, although it was largely overshadowed by the success of Hammer's own The Curse of Frankenstein. A sequel, Quatermass and the Pit, followed in 1967.

== Plot ==
As Professor Bernard Quatermass struggles to gain government support for his Moon colonisation project, his interest becomes focused on reports of hundreds of meteorites landing in an area known as Winnerden Flats. Travelling there with Marsh, his colleague, Quatermass finds a huge complex under construction, based on his lunar colony plans. Marsh finds an undamaged meteorite shaped like a small stone rocket. It then cracks open, releasing a gas, leaving him with an odd V-shaped mark on his face. Uniform-clad guards from the complex arrive, armed with submachine guns and sporting similar V-shaped marks, and take Marsh away, knocking down Quatermass and forcing him to leave the area.

Trying to discover what happened to Marsh, Quatermass contacts Inspector Lomax, who had previously assisted him in The Quatermass Xperiment. Lomax puts him in touch with Vincent Broadhead, a member of parliament, who has been trying to uncover the veil of secrecy surrounding Winnerden Flats and the organisation and deliverance of massive quantities of material supplies and manpower without any real explanation as to what it is for. Quatermass joins Broadhead on an official tour of the complex, which he is told has been built to manufacture synthetic food. Slipping away from the visiting party, Broadhead gets inside one of the huge domes dominating the skyline. Quatermass later finds him dying, covered in a corrosive black slime, warning him about what he discovered inside the dome.

Shot at by guards as he escapes, Quatermass rushes to Inspector Lomax, explaining that he believes that the complex is indeed making food, but not for human consumption. Its purpose is to provide a suitable living environment for small alien creatures being housed inside the huge domes. Lomax attempts to alert his superiors, but when he meets the commissioner of police, he notices that he, too, is sporting the V-shaped mark; the aliens have taken control of key people in the government.

Quatermass and Lomax then turn to journalist Jimmy Hall, who is sceptical of their story, but asks to visit Winnerden Flats. At the local community centre, they receive a hostile reception from locals employed to do heavy construction and other work at the complex but not told anything more than they need to know. The mood changes, however, when one of the meteorites crashes through the building roof and opens, injuring and infecting barmaid Sheila. Armed guards from the plant arrive and shoot Hall dead as he telephones his story into his newspaper. A melee ensues, after which the villagers form a mob that marches on the complex. Rushing the gates, Quatermass, Lomax, and the villagers barricade themselves inside the pressure control room.

Realising that Earth's atmosphere is poisonous to the aliens, Quatermass sabotages their life support system, pumping only pure oxygen into their large domes, suffocating them. Simultaneously, Quatermass's assistant, Brand at the rocket complex, is gunned down by invading Winnerden Flats guards but is able to launch an atomic rocket toward the near-Earth asteroid believed to be the alien's staging point. The individual aliens combine their small bodies, creating 150-foot tall masses that soon burst from their three domes. The rocket destroys the asteroid with a nuclear explosion. Their space base destroyed and now being fully exposed to Earth's atmosphere, the giant masses of combined creatures collapse and die. The V-shaped marks disappear from the affected humans, leaving them with no memory of having been under alien control. As they head back to the village, Lomax wonders aloud how he'll make a believable final report about all that's happened. Quatermass questions just how final that report will be.

== Cast ==
- Brian Donlevy as Professor Bernard Quatermass
- John Longden as Inspector Lomax
- Sid James as Jimmy Hall
- Bryan Forbes as Marsh
- William Franklyn as Dr. Brand
- Vera Day as Sheila
- Charles Lloyd Pack as Dawson
- Tom Chatto as Vincent Broadhead, MP
- John Van Eyssen as the PRO
- Percy Herbert as Gorman
- Michael Ripper as Ernie
- John Rae as McLeod
- Jane Aird as Mrs. McLeod

Other members of the cast include Michael Balfour as Harry, Edwin Richfield as Peterson, Marianne Stone as the community centre secretary, Lloyd Lamble as a police Inspector, John Stuart as a Commissioner, George Merritt as a police Superintendent, and Arthur Blake as a Constable.

== Production ==
The first Quatermass film had been a major success for Hammer and, eager for a sequel, they purchased the rights to Nigel Kneale's follow-up before the BBC had even begun transmission of the new serial. For this adaptation, Nigel Kneale himself was allowed to write the first draft of the screenplay, although subsequent drafts were worked on by director Val Guest. The plot is a condensed but largely faithful retelling of the original television serial. The main difference between the two versions is at the climax: in the television version Quatermass blasts off in a rocket to confront the aliens in outer space, whereas in the film the rocket is fired, unmanned, to destroy the aliens' asteroid base. Returning director Val Guest once again employed many cinema vérité techniques to present the fantastic elements of the plot with the greatest degree of realism. Nigel Kneale was critical of the final film, mainly on account of the return of Brian Donlevy in the lead role. Kneale was unhappy with Donlevy's interpretation of the character and also claimed the actor's performance was marred by his alcoholism, a claim denied by Val Guest.

Although Quatermass 2 was financially successful, its box office performance was eclipsed by the massive success of another Hammer film, The Curse of Frankenstein, which was to be the first of their many Gothic horror films. As a result, it would be ten years before Hammer adapted the next Quatermass serial for the cinema with Quatermass and the Pit (1967). Quatermass 2 was, however, the first film for which Hammer pre-sold the distribution rights in the United States, a financial model that would quickly become the norm for subsequent Hammer productions.

=== Writing ===
Nigel Kneale had been unhappy with Hammer's adaptation of The Quatermass Experiment, partly because he received no extra remuneration from the sale of the film rights and partly because of the changes made in the film to his original television script. In the wake of his dissatisfaction, Kneale exerted pressure on the BBC to allow him to be more involved in the sale of the rights to his work. Despite being in the final months of his BBC contract, Kneale was allowed to collaborate with Hammer on the adaptation of Quatermass II. The first draft of the screenplay was written by Kneale with input from producer Anthony Hinds. Director Val Guest worked on subsequent drafts, as he had done before on The Quatermass Xperiment. Guest recalled of Kneale's script that there was "lots of philosophising and very down-to-earth thinking but it was too long, it would not have held screenwise. So, again, I had to tailor it and sharpen it and hopefully not ruin it". The script was submitted to the British Board of Film Censors (BBFC) in April 1956. BBFC reader Audrey Field commented: "There should be the customary general caution that the sky is not the limit, either in sights or sounds". The BBFC's main objection was to a scene in which a guard from the Winnerden Flats complex murders a family having a picnic. This scene was omitted from the final film, although it is present in the original television presentation.

As with The Quatermass Xperiment, the screenplay for Quatermass 2 condenses many of the events of the original television version. The most significant change is at the climax: Quatermass and his assistant, Pugh, use Quatermass's rocket to travel to the asteroid to take on the aliens on their home ground, whereas in the theatrical film the rocket is fired, unmanned, at the asteroid to destroy it. Several characters from the television version do not appear in the film, most notably Quatermass's daughter, Paula, and his assistant, Leo Pugh (their roles are partially replaced by new character Brand). Conversely, the characters of Inspector Lomax and Quatermass's young assistant Marsh reappear in the film version, having previously been in The Quatermass Xperiment, but not in the television version. The character of Sheila the barmaid also appears only in the film version.

=== Casting ===
Sid James (Jimmy Hall), Brian Donlevy (Quatermass) and John Longden (Lomax) in a scene from Quatermass 2.

- Brian Donlevy as Professor Bernard Quatermass: Donlevy reprised his role as the eponymous professor, to the despair of Nigel Kneale, who had heavily criticised his interpretation of the role in The Quatermass Xperiment and claimed Donlevy's alcoholism presented challenges for the production. Kneale recalled visiting the set one day: "He [Donlevy] was so full of whiskey he could hardly stand up. He staggered over to the set and looked dazedly around. They held up an idiot board with his lines on and he said, "What's this movie called?" and they said, "Well, it's called Quatermass 2". He said, "I've got to say all that? There's too much talk. Cut down some of the talk". He tried to read it and he had to have go after go after go, so crippled with drink he hardly knew who he was". Val Guest has denied Kneale's claims: "So many stories have been concocted since, about how he was a paralytic. It's absolute balls, because he was not paralytic. He wasn't stone cold sober either, but he was a pro and he knew his lines". Guest also recalled: "By after lunch he would come to me and say "Give me a breakdown of the story so far. Where have I just been before this scene?" We used to feed him black coffee all morning but then we discovered he was lacing it. But he was a very professional actor and very easy to work with".
- John Longden as Inspector Lomax: The role of Lomax had originally been played by Jack Warner in The Quatermass Xperiment. When Warner proved unavailable for the sequel, the role was recast and the part given to John Longden. Longden had been a major star of British silent films and had also appeared in several early Alfred Hitchcock films including Blackmail (1929), Elstree Calling (1930) and The Skin Game (1931). Nigel Kneale greatly preferred Longden's authoritative take on the character to Jack Warner's more comedic "breezy sergeant" in the first film.
- Sid James (credited as Sydney James in the film and Sidney James on its poster) as Jimmy Hall: At the time, James was known as a character actor, specialising mainly in "tough guy" roles, with credits in films such as No Orchids for Miss Blandish (uncredited, 1948), The Lavender Hill Mob (1951), and Hell Drivers (1957). James plays the character of Jimmy Hall in a much more comedic manner than Roger Delgado's interpretation of the equivalent journalist character Hugh Conrad in the television version; Guest cast James in order to "lighten the story a bit". He later went on to enjoy widespread fame in many comedy roles including Hancock's Half Hour (1956–60), the Carry On series of films, and sitcoms such as George and the Dragon (1966), Two in Clover (1969–70) and Bless This House (1971–76).
- Bryan Forbes as Marsh: Forbes had appeared in a number of supporting roles in films, including The Small Back Room (1949), An Inspector Calls (1954) and The Colditz Story (1955). However, he later became better known as a director, with films such as Whistle Down the Wind (1961), The L-Shaped Room (1962) and The Stepford Wives (1975) among his best-known credits. Forbes later recalled of the film: "I was one of the people attacked by the alien pods. This pod exploded and I ended up with what was supposed to be a terrible alien growth on my face. Come lunchtime and we all went off to the pub. Of course, I couldn't take this stuff off, the makeup was too complex; the landlord refused to serve me".
- William Franklyn as Brand: Franklyn later became well known for his voiceovers for a series of advertisements for Schweppes tonic water. In 2004 he took over from the late Peter Jones as the Voice of the Book in the radio version of The Hitchhiker's Guide to the Galaxy. He died in 2006.
- Vera Day as Sheila: Vera Day was first spotted by Val Guest in the musical Wish You Were Here at the London Hippodrome.

Other actors appearing in the film include Charles Lloyd-Pack, Tom Chatto, John Van Eyssen, Percy Herbert, Michael Ripper, Marianne Stone and John Rae.

=== Filming ===
Val Guest, who had directed The Quatermass Xperiment, returned for Quatermass 2. Guest once again sought to create a film that felt as real as possible, using many cinema vérité techniques such as hand-held cameras. He was assisted in this respect by the moody, overcast cinematography of director of photography Gerald Gibbs, who also made extensive use of day for night photography for the film's climactic scenes. Guest planned each day's shooting carefully, creating meticulous storyboards detailing all the shots he wanted to make that day.

Filming took place between 28 May and 13 July 1956. The film's budget, at £92,000, was much larger than that of The Quatermass Xperiment. The bigger budget was achieved by the advance sale of the distribution rights in the United States to United Artists. United Artists contributed some £64,000 towards the production of the film, as well as Brian Donlevy's $25,000 fee and his airfare to London from the US. Although filming still occurred at Bray Studios in Berkshire, the larger budget allowed for greater use of location filming in the making of the film than had been possible for its predecessor. The key location used was the oil refinery at Shell Haven in Stanford-le-Hope, Essex, on the Thames Estuary, which represented the secret Winnerden Flats complex. This was also where location scenes in the BBC television production of the story were filmed. Despite its size, the plant was run by a relatively small number of personnel, simplifying Guest's job of making it appear eerily deserted. Guest was also surprised at how relaxed the plant's management were about allowing him to stage the climactic gun battle at such a potentially flammable location. Focus puller Harry Oakes recalled, however, that a Newman-Sinclair clockwork camera had to be used for some scenes because of the danger posed by sparks from electrical equipment. The scenes of Vincent Broadhead emerging from one of the domes covered in the noxious black slime were particularly difficult to realise, necessitating many retakes. Tom Chatto, playing Broadhead, whose wife was a leading casting director, joked after the scene was finally completed, "Remind me to talk to my wife about casting me in this". The Shell Haven location was further enhanced by the use of matte paintings created by special effects designer Les Bowie to add the giant domes within which the aliens were incubated.

Other locations used included the real-life new town of Hemel Hempstead, Hertfordshire, which was under construction at the time and doubled for the fictional new town of Winnerden Flats. Other scenes were shot in London including Trafalgar Square, where the police agreed to hold up the traffic for just two minutes to allow Guest to take shots of trucks ferrying equipment through London to Winnerden Flats, and in the foyer of the House of Lords for the scene where Quatermass first meets Vincent Broadhead. The climactic scenes of the hurricane caused by the explosion of the Winnerden Flats complex were shot on the South Downs near Brighton. A minor mishap occurred during the filming of this scene when the wind machines blew Brian Donlevy's toupée off his head and the crew had to chase after it. As well as shooting on location, Guest and his crew made use of Stages 2 and 5 of the New Elstree Studios, the first Hammer production to shoot there. This was production designer Bernard Robinson's first film for Hammer; he went on to become its regular set designer, working on many Hammer films.

== Release ==
Quatermass 2 received its first public screening at a trade show on 22 March 1957; its official première was held two months later at the London Pavilion on 24 May. It went on general release, with supporting feature And God Created Woman, on 17 June. The film received an 'X' Certificate from the BBFC. It was released in the US under the title Enemy From Space.

=== Home media ===
Quatermass 2 was released on Region 2 DVD in 2003 by DD Video. It contained a number of extra features including commentary by director Val Guest and writer Nigel Kneale, as well as an interview with Val Guest and a trailer for Enemy From Space, as the film is known in the US. The film was first released in the US on All Region NTSC DVD by Anchor Bay Entertainment and is mastered from an archival print; it contains the same extra features as on the Region 2 UK release. The film had been previously released on both VHS cassette and LaserDisc.

== Critical reception ==
=== Initial response ===
Quatermass 2 received mixed reviews. Campbell Dixon in The Daily Telegraph found the film "all good grisly fun, if this is the sort of thing you enjoy". The reviewer in The Times remarked that "the writer of the original story, Mr Nigel Kneale, and the director, Mr Val Guest, between them keep things moving at the right speed, without digressions. The film has an air of respect for the issues touched on, and this impression is confirmed by the acting generally". On the other hand, Jympson Harman of the London Evening News wrote: "Science-fiction hokum can be convincing, exciting or just plain laughable. Quatermass II fails on all these scores, I am afraid". Similarly, the reviewer in the Daily Herald felt: "The whole thing is daft and full of stilted dialogue. [...] At the end a detective says: "How am I going to make a report on all this?" I felt the same way".

=== Retrospective reviews ===
Critical opinion of Quatermass 2 in the years since its release remains divided. Writing in Science Fiction in the Cinema, John Baxter found the film "a faithful but ponderous adaptation of Kneale's TV sequel. There are effective sequences, director Guest and cameraman Gerald Gibbs shooting with light lancing up through the shadows in a manner reminiscent of Jacques Tourneur's Night (or Curse) of the Demon. Otherwise the film is indifferent". Similarly, John Brosnan, in his book The Primal Screen, wrote that "Quatermass 2 isn't as good as the first one, despite a bigger budget. Again the theme is possession (all four Quatermass stories are variations on the same theme) with Kneale again cleverly mixing sf with the supernatural. The alien invasion may be sf but it is presented with the trappings of traditional horror, such as the V-shaped "mark of the devil" that all possessed people display". On the other hand, Bill Warren, in Keep Watching The Skies!, found Quatermass 2 to be "one of the best science fiction films of the 1950s. It is not notably better than [The Quatermass Xperiment], but the story idea is more involving, the production is livelier and there are more events in the unfolding of the story". Kim Newman in 1986 praised the film as "extraordinary" and, comparing it to Invasion of the Body Snatchers (1956), Newman notes that while Don Siegel's film is "a general allegory" about dehumanisation and conformity, Quatermass 2 is "a specific attack on the Conservative Government of the time, down to the inclusion of several characters obviously based on real political figures".

== Sequel ==
A sequel based on Nigel Kneale's 1958-59 serial Quatermass and the Pit was produced by Hammer and released in 1967. Andrew Keir replaced Brian Donlevy as Quatermass, with Roy Ward Baker directing and Kneale writing the screenplay.

== Legacy ==
Although commercially successful, Quatermass 2's release was largely overshadowed by the box-office record-breaking performance of Hammer's The Curse of Frankenstein, which was also released in May 1957. Upon this success, Hammer made its priority the production of Gothic horror films. For this reason, although Nigel Kneale had written a new Quatermass serial for the BBC, Quatermass and the Pit (broadcast December 1958 to January 1959), Hammer did not acquire the rights until 1961 and the film version did not appear until 1967. Quatermass 2 is notable, however, for being the first film Hammer pre-sold to a major US distributor, in this case United Artists. This new finance and distribution deal would become the norm for subsequent Hammer films and led to them eventually winding down their own distribution arm, Exclusive Films, in the mid-1960s.

The League of Gentlemen's Mark Gatiss mentions on the DVD commentary for the First Series that a scene where two workmen, who have been abducted by Tubs and Edward, escape, covered in tar, was inspired by the scene in which the Vincent Broadhead character is covered in "synthetic food" from one of the huge outdoor storage domes.

== In other media ==
The film was adapted into a 15-page comics story for the August 1978 issue of the magazine Hammer's Halls of Horror (volume 2, #23, published by Top Sellers Ltd). It was drawn by David Lloyd from a script by Steve Parkhouse. The story was titled "Enemy from Space (Quatermass II)."
