= Quatermass II =

1955 British TV science-fiction serial

- Title card for Quatermass II
- Created by: Nigel Kneale
- Starring: John Robinson; Monica Grey; Hugh Griffith; John Stone
- Opening theme: "Mars, Bringer of War" by Gustav Holst
- Country of origin: United Kingdom
- No. of episodes: 6

Production
- Producer: Rudolph Cartier
- Camera setup: Multi-camera
- Running time: Approx 30 minutes per episode

Original release
- Network: BBC
- Release: 22 October – 26 November 1955

Related
- The Quatermass Experiment; Quatermass and the Pit

Quatermass II is a British six-part science fiction serial, originally broadcast by BBC Television in the autumn of 1955. It is the second in the Quatermass series by writer Nigel Kneale, and the oldest of those serials to survive in its entirety in the BBC archives.

The serial sees Professor Bernard Quatermass of the British Experimental Rocket Group being asked to examine strange meteorite showers. His investigations lead to his uncovering a conspiracy involving alien infiltration at the highest levels of the British government. As even some of Quatermass's closest colleagues fall victim to the alien influence, he is forced to use his own unsafe rocket prototype, which recently caused a nuclear disaster at an Australian testing range, to prevent the aliens from taking over mankind.

Although sometimes compared unfavourably to the first and third Quatermass serials, Quatermass II was praised for its allegorical concerns of the damaging effects of industrialisation and the corruption of governments by big business. It is described on the British Film Institute's Screenonline website as "compulsive viewing".

== Casting and crew ==
Reginald Tate, who had played the title role in The Quatermass Experiment, collapsed and died on 23 August 1955, aged 58. This was less than a month before the shooting of the location filming for Quatermass II began, and necessitated the casting of a replacement lead actor at short notice; John Robinson was chosen to fill the part. Robinson was an experienced actor from a range of different films and television programmes since the 1930s, but was uncomfortable about taking over from Tate, and had difficulty in learning some of the technical dialogue he was required to deliver. Robinson's delivery of his lines has been criticised by some later reviewers.

Appearing as Quatermass's chief assistant Dr Leo Pugh was Welsh actor Hugh Griffith, who had been an actor on stage and screen since the 1930s, but gained his highest profile roles after Quatermass II; he went on to win the Academy Award for Best Supporting Actor as Sheikh Ilderim in Ben-Hur (1959). He also appeared in Lucky Jim (1957) and Oliver! (1968).

Monica Grey played Paula Quatermass; she was chosen by BBC management rather than the production team, as she was the wife of the BBC's head of radio drama, Val Gielgud. As Hugh Griffith also had problems with some of his technical dialogue, Grey learned his lines as well as her own, in case she needed to step in and assist him during the live performance. Dillon was played by John Stone; Stone too had a long career as a supporting actor in a range of British television series, and in 1956 had a small role in the film X the Unknown, which Hammer Film Productions had intended as a sequel to their version of The Quatermass Experiment, until Kneale denied them the rights to use the character.

Four actors who each became well known for a particular role on British television had supporting parts in Quatermass II. Rupert Davies who played MP Vincent Broadhead would go on to find fame as Sûreté detective Commissaire Jules Maigret, the title character of 1960s TV series Maigret, based on Georges Simenon's novels. Roger Delgado, who originated the role of the Master in Doctor Who (1971–73), played a journalist who helps Quatermass before falling victim to "the mark" in episode four. Wilfrid Brambell, later star of the sitcom Steptoe and Son (1962–74), appeared as a tramp. and Melvyn Hayes, who played the small role of Frankie, later worked in several films with Cliff Richard and starred in the BBC sitcom "It Ain't Half Hot Mum".

Nigel Kneale not only wrote the serial but, previously an actor, had two speaking parts. He played the voice heard over the factory loudspeaker system in episode five, and narrated the recaps at the beginning of episodes two, three, four and six. Kneale went on to write feature film screenplays such as Look Back in Anger (1958) and First Men in the Moon (1964), as well as continuing to write for television, including two further Quatermass serials, until 1997.

Kneale credited the director Rudolph Cartier with bringing to the screen in Quatermass II, with its ambitious location filming, an expansive style that had not been seen in British television drama beforehand. Cartier worked with Kneale again on the third Quatermass serial, Quatermass and the Pit, in 1958, and had subsequent successes with plays such as Anna Karenina (1961), Cross of Iron (1961) and Lee Oswald – Assassin (1966). He continued directing for television until the 1970s.

== Episodes ==
No.	Title	Directed by	Written by	Original release date	Prod. code	U.K. viewers (millions)
1	"The Bolts"	Rudolph Cartier	Nigel Kneale	22 October 1955	T/2041	7.9m
Meteorites are falling over Northern England, one of which is observed by an Army radar unit. After a farmer finds one of the objects in a field, the soldiers become directly involved, and Captain Johnny Dillon decides to unofficially ask the father of his fiancée, Paula, to investigate. Paula's father is Professor Bernard Quatermass of the British Experimental Rocket Group – "the rocket man!", as one of Dillon's troops puts it. Quatermass and the Rocket Group, now including Paula and mathematical genius Dr Leo Pugh, are recovering from the news that one of the two nuclear Quatermass II rockets has exploded during a ground test in Australia, killing hundreds of staff and ending their project to build permanent bases on the Moon. Quatermass agrees to accompany Dillon on an investigation and the pair visit the farmer, who refuses to talk and sends them away. At a pub, they find out that the nearby village of Winnerden Flats has been levelled to build an enormous industrial plant protected by armed guards, which is identical to Quatermass's moonbase design. Upon investigating a newly fallen meteorite, Dillon is sprayed with ammonia gas from it, and a distinctive mark appears on his face.
2	"The Mark"	Rudolph Cartier	Nigel Kneale	29 October 1955	T/2043	7.9m
Similarly 'marked' armed guards arrive from the plant and take Dillon away. Whilst being taken Dillon threateningly tells Quatermass not to follow. After the guards' departure Quatermass speaks with a tramp, who explains that there used to be a small government research unit consisting of a few huts by Winnerden Flats, and that a year ago they expanded and bulldozed the village, and built the plant and a prefab town for the construction workers. At the prefab town, Quatermass sees that 'the mark' and strange behaviour are associated with those who find the fallen meteorites, but before he can find out more the community police order him away. Quatermass returns to the Rocket Group, where Leo has reconstructed the meteorite, which can carry ammonia and other gases and travel through the atmosphere to the ground in one piece. In London, the Metropolitan Police claim they have no jurisdiction over the matter, so he goes to his contact Fowler at the ministry, who reveals that the plant is a top secret project to make synthetic food, but Vincent Broadhead MP, who is conducting an inquiry into the project, reveals that there are identical plants in Brazil and Siberia. Upon gaining entry to the inquiry, Quatermass notices that one of the civil servants has 'the mark'.
3	"The Food"	Rudolph Cartier	Nigel Kneale	5 November 1955	T/2044	7.9m
As he tries to investigate further, Quatermass finds that other figures in high levels of government have gained 'the mark' after coming across meteorites. Quatermass leaves the inquiry, then returns with Fowler to find that Broadhead has been 'marked' and now claims there is no problem with the project. Fowler takes Quatermass to meet with civil servant Rupert Ward, who has the authority to inspect the plant. Back at the Rocket Group, Leo and Paula deduce and discover with a radio telescope that an asteroid is orbiting the Earth invisibly and discharging the meteorites when it reaches the near point, 400,000 miles over Southern England every 14 hours. Ward helps Quatermass and Fowler gain entry to the plant and they find that Dillon has been discharged from the infirmary and has left. They then look around and discover that gases are pumped to the giant pressure domes from the pilot plant: ammonia, hydrogen, nitrogen and methane, as opposed to oxygen as in Quatermass' moonbase pressure dome idea. Meanwhile, the guards intimidate and then murder a family who were having a picnic nearby. Back at the plant, Ward slips away to look inside a dome, and Quatermass and Fowler find him stumbling out of it dying and covered in black slime, which before his death Ward reveals was inside the dome instead of food. Fowler and Quatermass escape back to the Rocket Group and analyse Ward's tie with Leo and Paula, finding that the slime is a corrosive, poisonous substance, fatal to all forms of life on Earth. Meanwhile, the asteroid is approaching its near point.
4	"The Coming"	Rudolph Cartier	Nigel Kneale	12 November 1955	T/2045	8.3m
Quatermass deduces that an alien life-form which comes from one of the moons of Saturn, which lives on ammonia, hydrogen and methane, but to which oxygen is a deadly poison, travels to earth in the meteorites, and in the few seconds they spend out of their shells before dying they take possession of human minds, and transmit knowledge to each other in a collective consciousness. From this, they assume that it was the population of Winnderden Flats itself who demolished the village and built the plant. Quatermass decides that they can use the remaining Quatermass II rocket like a nuclear bomb and destroy the asteroid, despite Leo's protest that the rocket is unsafe to fly. Fowler tries to steal information about the other plants from the ministry, but is overcome and possessed by a makeshift meteorite hidden inside a filing cabinet. That night Quatermass travels with journalist Hugh Conrad to the prefab town where they meet with construction workers who say that work has been suspended for all except the 'zombies' ('marked' people). They claim that the meteorites are only over-shots from the plant after one of them lands in a pub. These recent meteorites are falling in hundreds and being collected by special guard teams, and then returned to the plant. Quatermass steals a guard's uniform from a lorry to gain entry to the plant. As he does this Conrad returns to the pub to telephone his newspaper and reveal everything about the secret alien invasion, but he becomes 'marked' before he can finish. The construction workers, however, hear what he says and decide to take action. Meanwhile, Quatermass is inside a pressure dome, where he sees guards putting meteorites into the tanks of poisonous slime that killed Ward, where together, in the recreated atmosphere of a distant world, they combine and grow into the first of the enormous ammonid alien creatures.
5	"The Frenzy"	Rudolph Cartier	Nigel Kneale	19 November 1955	T/2046	8.3m
Quatermass is narrowly saved from discovery by the rioting construction workers, who storm the plant and along with him are besieged inside the gas distribution centre, where they pump oxygen into the completed pressure dome to poison the ammonids. However, some of the workers succumb to propaganda from the plant controllers, who offer them the chance to see inside the dome. The guards kill them by blocking the pipe with their bodies. In anger, the remaining workers fire on the dome with a bazooka, igniting the hydrogen and subsequently destroying the entire plant, killing the ammonids and releasing ammonia gas into the surrounding area. Quatermass escapes the plant in a gas mask and meets up with Leo, whom he finds unconscious in his car nearby. With little time left to prevent more ammonids returning in meteorites, he and Leo are forced to use the Quatermass II to attempt to destroy the asteroid, despite the known flaws in the rocket's design and its liability to explode. They return to the Rocket Group, but British Paratroopers led by Johnny Dillon take control of the firing base.
6	"The Destroyers"	Rudolph Cartier	Nigel Kneale	26 November 1955	T/2047	9.0m
The team invite Dillon up to the control room, where they see he has written orders from the very top, which shows that the ammonids have long been in control of the government. They appeal to his human side to allow them to continue, which he does so after Leo tells him the rocket must launch. Despite both being old and unfit, Quatermass and Leo are the only two who have the scientific knowledge to make such a flight. They fly to the asteroid and land on it, but en route Quatermass finds out that the night the plant exploded Leo was possessed by the ammonids. Leo intends to kill Quatermass to prevent the destruction of the asteroid, and also to allow the ammonids to travel back to Earth en masse in the Quatermass II. He tries to kill Quatermass with a gun, but the recoil sends him floating helplessly off into space. Quatermass returns to the rocket and jettisons the nuclear motor, then flies the rocket back to Earth as the motor blows up the asteroid, killing the remaining ammonids and relinquishing control over Dillon and all the 'marked' humans, returning mankind to its former freedom.

== Production ==
On 22 September 1955 the ITV network was launched in the UK, bringing commercial television to Britain for the first time and ending the BBC's broadcasting monopoly in the country. The new network's creation had been established by the Television Act 1954, and the BBC had known in advance that it would need programmes to combat the new rival for television audiences. Referring to the 1953 science-fiction serial The Quatermass Experiment in a memo written in 1954, BBC Television's Controller of Programmes, Cecil McGivern, noted that: "Had competitive television been in existence then, we would have killed it every Saturday night while [The Quatermass Experiment] lasted. We are going to need many more 'Quatermass Experiment' programmes".

Having recently signed a two-year extension to his BBC staff writer's contract, Nigel Kneale was specifically commissioned to write a sequel to The Quatermass Experiment in early 1955 to challenge the new ITV network. Kneale was inspired by contemporary fears over secret UK Ministry of Defence research establishments such as Porton Down, and also by being required, as a BBC staff member, to sign the Official Secrets Act. As with The Quatermass Experiment, Quatermass II was produced and directed by Rudolph Cartier; he and Kneale particularly enjoyed working together. Since the first Quatermass serial, the two men had collaborated on the literary adaptations Wuthering Heights (1953) and Nineteen Eighty-Four (1954), and on Kneale's abominable snowman play The Creature (1955).

Quatermass II comprised six half-hour episodes, transmitted live from Studio G at the BBC's Lime Grove Studios in London. The episodes – individually subtitled "The Bolts", "The Mark", "The Food", "The Coming", "The Frenzy" and "The Destroyers" – were shown every Saturday night at 8 p.m. from 22 October to 26 November 1955; because of the live nature of the performances, most of the episodes overran their allotted half-hour slots slightly. Each episode was rehearsed on the Monday to Friday before transmission at Mansergh Woodall Boys Club in St John's Wood, London, and then camera rehearsed in studio for most of the day on the Saturday.

Not every scene was performed live; because of the increased budget – £7,552 was spent on the serial, nearly double the amount spent on The Quatermass Experiment – Cartier was able to include a larger proportion of pre-filmed inserts on 35 mm film, which were included during the live transmissions of each episode. Most of the pre-filmed material was shot on location at the Shell Haven oil refinery in Stanford-le-Hope, doubling for the factory where the alien creature is being grown on Earth. Filming also took place in rural Essex for material showing the meteorites being discovered in fields, and in the boiler rooms of the under-construction BBC Television Centre in London for scenes set inside the factory. The location film sequences were the most ambitious that had then been attempted in British television drama, which was usually predominantly studio-bound.

Each episode of Quatermass II was telerecorded onto 35 mm film during its live transmission, for a scheduled repeat the following Monday night at 10:15 p.m. All six episodes survive intact in the BBC's archives, although the telerecording copies in some cases suffer from poor quality sound and vision. Owing to either technical or artistic problems, Cartier had some scenes re-performed by the cast immediately following the live performance on the Saturday evening, and these were telerecorded and used to replace the live versions in the Monday night repeats. Quatermass II was one of the first BBC drama productions to be repeated from a telerecording, rather than having the production re-performed live for any second showing as had been the norm in the past.

Episode three, "The Food", was repeated in a slightly edited form on BBC 2 on 26 August 1991 as part of The Lime Grove Story. This was a day of programming to commemorate the closure of the studios after 40 years of use by the BBC.

== Reception and influence ==
The available British television audience had doubled since The Quatermass Experiment had been shown in 1953, and the viewing figures for Quatermass II were accordingly higher. The serial gained an audience of 7.9 million viewers for its first three episodes, rising to 8.3 million for the fourth and fifth and concluding with 9 million. A BBC audience research report commissioned after Quatermass II had finished found that 90% of those questioned in the sample had watched at least five episodes of the production.

Quatermass II received positive newspaper reviews in the Daily Mail and the Daily Express, although the BBC's Radio Times listings magazine published letters of both praise and criticism for the serial. The serial was also criticised internally at the BBC by Cecil McGivern, who felt it to be not as good as the original. One letter received by the production team before the transmission of episode five came from a woman in Haverfordwest who was concerned that she would never find out what happened in the end as the week before the final episode's transmission she was due to move to Ireland to spend the rest of her life in a convent; she wondered if the BBC could possibly write to her and let her know how the story resolved. After some debate as to whether the letter was a journalistic trick to uncover advance story details, Kneale eventually decided that it was genuine, and allowed Cartier to send a reply outlining the storyline's conclusion. Following episode six, some viewers wrote in to the BBC concerned at Quatermass's survival, as he had not been seen to definitely return to Earth in the experimental rocket ship.

The BBC's own website regarded Quatermass II unfavourably when reviewing its DVD release in 2005: "The script is too often let down by the production's rougher edges. Your heart will break halfway through episode six as it all falls apart. And then there's Monica Gray [sic] – less an actress than a finishing school on legs". Writing in The Times in 2006, Morgan Falconer claimed to find racist undertones in the serial: "Quatermass, for instance, often seemed to have an unhealthy preoccupation with blackness, a barely veiled commentary on racial change in Britain. In one scene in Quatermass II, the Professor stands outside a pub and watches the sky fill with dark asteroids. 'They're coming in their thousands', he says, 'this is it'". However, this interpretation of the serial is not widespread, and is undermined in episode five where an Irish immigrant helps Quatermass sabotage the aliens' food supply system. In any case, it is in direct contrast with Kneale's deliberate attack on racial intolerance in Quatermass and the Pit.

Speaking in a 2003 television documentary about Nigel Kneale's career, the writer and critic Kim Newman praised the underlying themes of Quatermass II, and their particular relevance to the British way of life: "Quatermass II is the British Invasion of the Bodysnatchers, but I don't necessarily think that's a bad thing... What Quatermass II does is take that metaphor and apply it to the specific conditions of Britain in the 1950s; not just the Cold War paranoia, but the traditional British grumbling resentment of bureaucracy as represented by the council, or in this case big business". The British Film Institute's "Screenonline" website also offers praise in its analysis of the serial:

"With its tale of an invasion by an invisible enemy indistinguishable from ourselves, Kneale's story tapped into contemporary fears about the 'red' (i.e. communist) threat, although in a less direct way than the American science fiction films of the 1950s, including Invasion of the Body Snatchers. At the same time, it reflected the widespread anxiety of the nuclear age – the story begins with a failed test of a nuclear-powered rocket in Australia (at a time when the country was in reality a site for a series of British nuclear weapons tests). In short, Quatermass II was the perfect cold-war drama".

Some science fiction fans have speculated that the Quatermass serials in general, and Quatermass II in particular – with its elements including a conspiracy of silence in the government concerning extraterrestrial life, secret government facilities for alien use, and the silencing of any critic who opposes the government's plans – influenced the successful American series The X-Files (1993–2002). Kneale was invited to write for The X-Files during the 1990s, but declined the offer.

Other genre productions that have been compared with the serial include the 1970 Doctor Who story Spearhead from Space. This serial features an alien entity falling to Earth in a meteorite shower; a factory taken over for the growth of the alien creature, and governmental institutions being infiltrated by servants of the aliens.

== Other media ==
As with The Quatermass Experiment, the film rights to the serial were purchased by Hammer Film Productions – in this case after they had only read the scripts, before the serial was even made. Titled Quatermass 2, the film was released in 1957 and once again directed by Val Guest, with Brian Donlevy starring; unlike the first film, Kneale wrote the screenplay himself. In the United States, the film was released under the title Enemy from Space.

Shortly after Quatermass II finished its run, comedian Bob Monkhouse included a spoof of the serial in an episode of his own BBC television series, which featured Monica Grey reprising her role as Paula Quatermass. Cartier and Kneale were greatly displeased with this and complained to their superiors at the BBC about it.

Quatermass returned to the BBC in 1958 when Kneale's third serial, Quatermass and the Pit, began transmission. That was the last television appearance of the character for 20 years, until Kneale brought Quatermass back for a final time in the 1979 serial Quatermass, this time produced for Thames Television.

A serialised novelisation of Quatermass II, written by Kneale, ran in the Daily Express newspaper in the UK from 5 to 20 December 1955, although Kneale was forced to draw the storyline to a premature conclusion as the paper lost interest in the project. The television scripts were released by Penguin Books in 1960, with a selection of stills from the production also included. The book was re-released in 1979, with a new introduction by Kneale, to coincide with the transmission of the Thames Television serial.

In April 2005 BBC Worldwide released a DVD box set of all its existing Quatermass material. This included digitally restored versions of all six episodes of Quatermass II, with the sound and vision of the telerecording copies cleaned up as far as possible, and some of the existing special effects inserts that survived on their original film elements being re-inserted into the episodes.

In 2016 BBC Store released Quatermass II and Quatermass and the Pit.
