= Bernard Quatermass =

Fictional scientist

- First appearance: The Quatermass Experiment (1953)
- Last appearance: The Quatermass Experiment (remake) (2005)
- Created by: Nigel Kneale
- Portrayed by: Reginald Tate (TV 1953) Brian Donlevy (Film 1955, 1957) John Robinson (TV 1955) André Morell (TV 1958–1959) Andrew Keir (Film 1967, BBC Radio 1996) John Mills (TV 1979) Jason Flemyng (TV 2005)

In-universe information
- Gender: Male
- Title: Professor
- Occupation: Aerospace engineer
- Children: Paula Carlson
- Relatives: Hettie Carlson (granddaughter)
- Nationality: British; American (1955 & 1957 films)

Professor Bernard Quatermass is a fictional scientist originally created by writer Nigel Kneale for BBC Television. An intelligent and highly moral British scientist, Quatermass is a pioneer of the British space programme, heading the British Experimental Rocket Group. He continually finds himself confronting sinister alien forces that threaten to destroy humanity.

The role of Quatermass was featured in three influential BBC science fiction serials of the 1950s, and again in a final serial for Thames Television in 1979. A remake of the first serial appeared on BBC Four in 2005. The character also appeared in films, on the radio and in print over a fifty-year period. Kneale picked the character's unusual surname from a London telephone directory, while the first name was in honour of the astronomer Bernard Lovell.

The character of Quatermass has been described by BBC News Online as Britain's first television hero, and by The Independent newspaper as "a brilliantly conceived and finely crafted creation ... [He] remained a modern 'Mr Standfast', the one fixed point in an increasingly dreadful and ever-shifting universe". In 2005, an article in The Daily Telegraph suggested that the character shares other elements from other British heroes such as Sherlock Holmes.

== Character ==
Little is revealed of Quatermass's early life during the course of the films and television series in which he appears. In The Quatermass Experiment, he at one point despairs that he should have stuck to his original career as a surveyor.

In Nigel Kneale's 1996 radio serial The Quatermass Memoirs, it is revealed that the Professor was first involved in rocketry experiments in the 1930s, and that his wife died young. The unmade prequel serial Quatermass in the Third Reich, an idea conceived by Kneale in the late 1990s, would have shown Quatermass travelling to Nazi Germany during the 1936 Berlin Olympics and becoming involved with Wernher von Braun and the German rocket programme, before helping a young Jewish refugee to escape from the country. According to The Quatermass Memoirs, during World War II Quatermass conducted top secret work for the British war effort, which he subsequently refused ever to discuss.

By 1953 (in The Quatermass Experiment), Quatermass is the head of the British Experimental Rocket Group, which has a programme to launch a crewed rocket into space from a base in Tarooma, Australia. Although Quatermass succeeds in launching a three-man crew, the rocket vastly overshoots its projected orbit and returns to Earth much later than planned, crash-landing in London. Only one of the crew, Victor Carroon, remains; it transpires that he has been taken over by an alien presence, eventually forcing Quatermass to destroy him and the other two crewmembers who have been absorbed into him in a climax set in Westminster Abbey.

Despite this trauma, Quatermass continues with his space programme, now called the British Rocket Group, and by Quatermass II (1955) is actively planning the establishment of Moon bases. In this serial, his daughter, Paula Quatermass, works as an assistant at the Rocket Group, but there is no sign of a wife or other children. In the fourth episode of the serial, he mentions that he never reached his twenty-fifth wedding anniversary, tying in with The Quatermass Memoirs later assertion of his wife's early death.

At the beginning of the third serial, Quatermass and the Pit (1958–59), Quatermass's funding is being cut and the Rocket Group is being handed over to military control, much to his disgust. Command is to be handed over to Colonel Breen, and Quatermass senses that he is being forced out: however, after the events of the serial, Breen is dead, Quatermass has helped to save the world and London is recovering from chaos.

It is not clear what happens to the Rocket Group immediately after this: the next time Quatermass is seen on screen (Quatermass, also released internationally as The Quatermass Conclusion and Quatermass IV, 1979) he has long been retired, living in retreat in the Scottish Highlands. He has recently become the guardian of his teenaged granddaughter Hettie after her parents were killed in a road accident in Germany. After Hettie runs away from home, he travels to London in search of her and finds a dystopian world there. Quatermass and the scientist Joe Kapp establish that an alien probe is causing the collapse of society by feeding on the world's youth, and Quatermass forms a plan to drive the intruder away by the detonation of a nuclear bomb. He presses the button to detonate it himself, with Hettie's help, and they are killed in the blast as the planet is saved.

== Appearances ==
Television
Title	Year	Played by	Notes
The Quatermass Experiment	1953	Reginald Tate	Only two episodes of six exist
Quatermass II	1955	John Robinson	All six episodes exist
Quatermass and the Pit	1958–59	André Morell	All six episodes exist
Quatermass	1979	John Mills	Four-part TV series AKA Quatermass IV recut into film The Quatermass Conclusion
The Quatermass Experiment	2005	Jason Flemyng	TV film Remake of the 1953 TV series, broadcast live

Film
The Quatermass Xperiment	1955	Brian Donlevy	Remake of the 1953 TV series AKA The Creeping Unknown (USA)
Quatermass 2	1957	Brian Donlevy	Remake of the 1955 TV series AKA Enemy From Space (USA)
Quatermass and the Pit	1967	Andrew Keir	Remake of the 1958–59 TV series AKA Five Million Years to Earth (USA)
The Quatermass Conclusion	1979	John Mills	Recut of the 1979 TV series into a film

Radio
The Quatermass Memoirs	1996	Andrew Keir	Broadcast on BBC Radio 3

== History ==
Nigel Kneale conceived the character of Quatermass in 1953, when he was assigned in his capacity as a BBC television staff drama writer to create a new six-part serial to run on Saturday nights in July and August. Kneale initially named his leading character Professor Charlton, but during the writing process decided he wanted something more striking and memorable.

A native of the Isle of Man, Kneale was inspired by the fact that surnames beginning with "Qu" were common on the island. The eventual name was picked from a London telephone directory; there was a family by that name who traded as fruiterers in the city's East End. In 1955, the Evening News interviewed the one Quatermass in the telephone book - Sidney Quatermass, aged 80 - who reported that he had been surprised, but enjoyed watching his namesake on television. The surname has its origins as a measurement of land assigned in the division of England by the Normans following their conquest of the country under William the Conqueror in 1066. The Professor's first name, Bernard, was in honour of the astronomer Bernard Lovell, founder of the Jodrell Bank Observatory in Cheshire, England.

=== On television (1950s) ===
The director assigned to the serial, which was eventually named The Quatermass Experiment, was Rudolph Cartier. A few months beforehand he had directed a play entitled It Is Midnight, Dr. Schweitzer for the BBC, and he offered the role of Quatermass to one of the stars of that play, André Morell. Morell considered the offer but declined the part, which Cartier then offered to Reginald Tate, another actor who had appeared in the play, who accepted.

The serial was a success, with the British Film Institute later describing it as "one of the most influential series of the 1950s". The following year the BBC's Controller of Programmes, Cecil McGivern—who had initially feared that viewers would not accept such an unusual name for the leading character—noted in reference to the impending launch of the rival ITV network that: "Had competitive television been in existence then, we would have killed it every Saturday night while [The Quatermass Experiment] lasted. We are going to need many more 'Quatermass Experiment' programmes".

A sequel, Quatermass II, was accordingly commissioned in 1955, but Reginald Tate died of a heart attack only a month before production was due to begin. With very little time to find a replacement, John Robinson was picked as the only suitable actor available. Robinson was uncomfortable about taking over from Tate and with some of the technical dialogue he was required to deliver, and his performance has been criticised as "robotic", although others such as Andrew Pixley in Time Screen Magazine have praised Robinson for doing compelling work after the initial episode of the serial.

By the summer of 1957, Kneale was working on the scripts for a third and final BBC serial. Titled Quatermass and the Pit and again produced and directed by Cartier, this was eventually broadcast in December 1958 and January 1959. John Robinson was no longer available to play Quatermass, so the role was offered instead to Alec Clunes. Clunes turned down the part, and it was offered once more to André Morell, who this time accepted. Morell has been praised by several reviewers as having given the definitive portrayal of Quatermass. The serial itself has been praised by the BBC's own website as "simply the first finest thing the BBC ever made. It justifies licence fees to this day". Despite this success, Kneale was unsure about whether the character would ever return, later telling an interviewer: "I didn't want to go on repeating because Professor Quatermass had already saved the world from ultimate destruction three times, and that seemed to me to be quite enough".

Of the TV serials, Quatermass II and Quatermass and the Pit have been preserved in full. Only the first two episodes of The Quatermass Experiment now exist.

=== In films ===
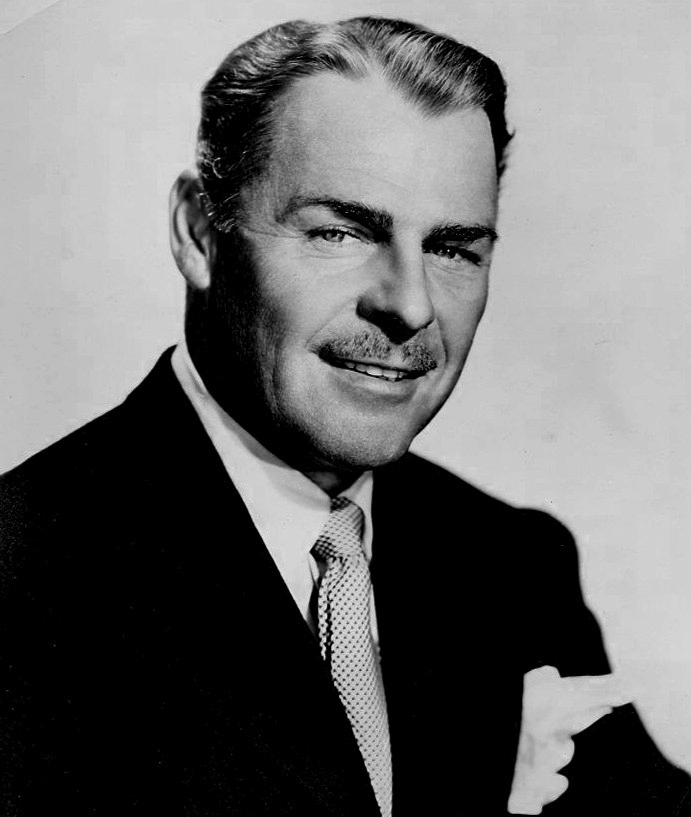
American actor Brian Donlevy portrays the titular character in the film adaptations The Quatermass Xperiment (1955) and Quatermass 2 (1957).

At roughly the same time as Quatermass II was being transmitted by the BBC, Hammer Film Productions released its film adaptation of the first serial in British cinemas. Directed by Val Guest, it was retitled The Quatermass Xperiment to capitalise on the British "X" classification and starred American actor Brian Donlevy as part of a deal to help the film find US distribution. Kneale, who had little involvement with the film, was unimpressed with this casting: "I may have picked Quatermass's surname out of a phone book, but his first name was carefully chosen: Bernard, after Bernard Lovell, the creator of Jodrell Bank. Pioneer, ultimate questing man. Donlevy played him as a mechanic, a creature with a completely closed mind". Val Guest has praised Donlevy's performance, saying that "he gave it absolute reality".

Despite Kneale's reservations about the casting, The Quatermass Xperiment was the highest-grossing film Hammer had made up to that point in its history, and has since been described by one academic as "the key British science fiction film of the 1950s". Hammer was keen to make an immediate follow-up, and wanted to use Quatermass in its 1956 film X the Unknown, but Kneale refused Hammer the rights, and the company created its own substitute character, Doctor Adam Royston. Hammer did release an adaptation of Quatermass II in 1957, called Quatermass 2 and this time with Kneale's involvement in the script. To the writer's displeasure, Donlevy returned as Quatermass.

Hammer also purchased the film rights to Quatermass and the Pit (released in the US as Five Million Years to Earth), as it had done with the previous two TV serials, although it did not release its version until 1967. This time the film was directed by Roy Ward Baker and starred Scottish actor Andrew Keir, after Morell had been offered and declined the chance to play the part again. Keir's performance was well-received, particularly in contrast to Donlevy's portrayal. The Guardian newspaper wrote in 1997 that: "Keir also made many films ... most gratifyingly, perhaps, the movie version of Quatermass and the Pit (1967), when he finally replaced the absurdly miscast Brian Donlevy".

Soon after the release of the Quatermass and the Pit film, Kneale was approached by Hammer about writing a fourth Quatermass story directly for them, but the idea came to nothing.

In July 1993, it was reported Richard and Lauren Shuler Donner had acquired 200 titles of Hammer's library from rights holder Roy Skeggs with the intention of remaking them for film and television. The following month it was reported Warner Bros. had signed a deal with the Donners to develop the new Hammer projects. The first of the intended Hammer remakes was to be a $40-50 million remake of The Quatermass Xperiment to be titled Xperiment to be written by Dan O'Bannon with either Sean Connery or Anthony Hopkins eyed to play Bernard Quatermass along with remakes of Quatermass 2 and Quatermass and the Pit and possibly further installments should Xperiment prove successful. Ultimately, despite interest expressed by both the press and Warner Bros., nothing ultimately came of this deal and both Xperiment and the Hammer revival were abandoned. By January 1998, Alex Proyas was reported developing an updated version of Quatermass and the Pit, but Proyas indicated that legal issues which he could not elaborate on needed to be cleared up by Warner Bros. before it could move forward. In February 2012 Simon Oakes, president of the revived Hammer Films, announced a new Quatermass film, but nothing came of the project after his announcement.

=== On television (1970s onwards) ===
By the early 1970s Kneale was once again regularly writing for the BBC, which announced plans to produce a fourth Quatermass serial in 1972. This ultimately was not made by the BBC, but Kneale's scripts were produced in 1979 as a four-part serial for Thames Television, titled Quatermass. This time John Mills played Quatermass in an expensive and high-profile production, which was screened on the ITV network. The production company Euston Films also released a 100-minute film version titled The Quatermass Conclusion or Quatermass IV, for distribution abroad. There was, however, little interest among film distributors, and it received only a limited theatrical release.

Kneale was not keen to return to the character following this, telling one interviewer: "I blew him up ... and I don't feel inclined to invent a 'Son of Quatermass' either". However, in the late 1990s he conceived an idea for a prequel serial, entitled Quatermass in the Third Reich, set in Germany in the 1930s. The idea was submitted to the BBC, which turned it down.

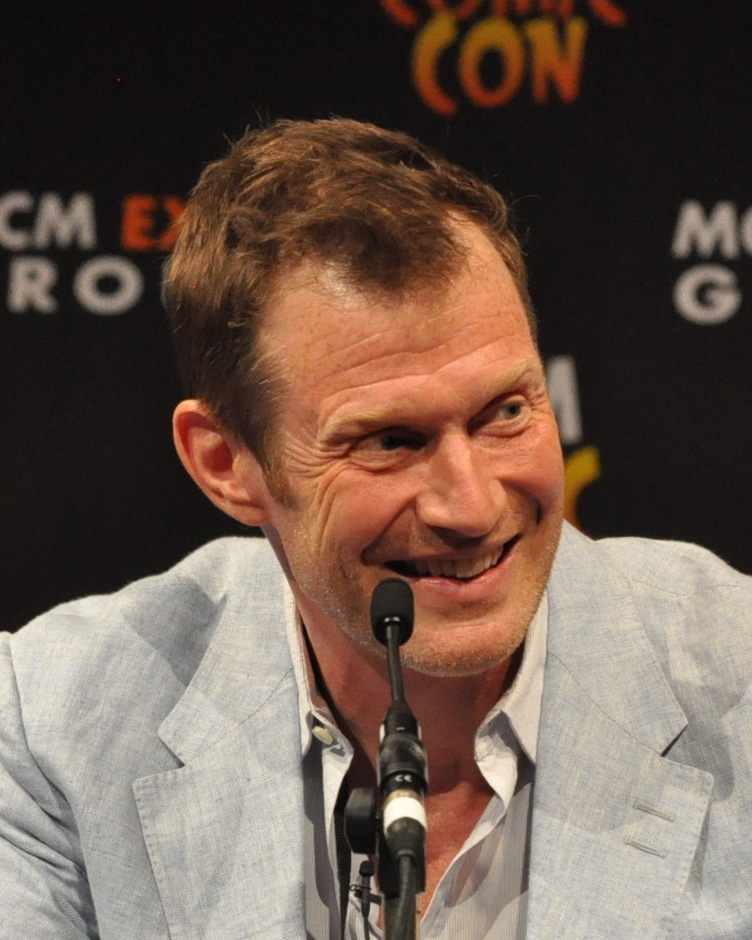
Jason Flemying portrays the titular character in the 2005 remake of The Quatermass Experiment.

In 2005, the digital television channel BBC Four produced a new version of The Quatermass Experiment, transmitted live as the original had been. Jason Flemyng starred as Quatermass. The Times's television reviewer, Sarah Vine, commented of this production: "Jason Flemyng as Quatermass made a surprisingly good fist of things ... the live performance lent the drama an edge that might have been lost in re-takes".

== In other media ==
In addition to the character's various television and film appearances, Quatermass was also seen in a variety of other media between the 1950s and the 1990s. In 1955 Kneale was invited by the publishers of the Daily Express to write a new prose Quatermass story for serialisation in their newspaper; as he was unable to think of a new storyline, they suggested he simply adapt Quatermass II, which he agreed to do. The serialisation ran in the Daily Express from 5 to 20 December 1955, although Kneale was forced to draw it to a rapid conclusion when the paper lost interest in the project and instructed him to complete the story as soon as possible.

A script book for The Quatermass Experiment, including some photographs from the production, was released by Penguin Books in 1959. This was followed by similar releases of Quatermass II and Quatermass and the Pit, both published in 1960. All three of these releases were reprinted by Arrow Books in 1979 with new introductions by Kneale, to tie-in with the television transmission of the fourth and final serial.

Arrow Books also released a novelisation of the 1979 Quatermass serial, written by Kneale. This was written during production, and contained many additional scenes and extra background detail not included in the original scripts. Kneale offered many of these new scenes to the producers of the television version, but by this stage it was too late for them to be incorporated.

In 1995, BBC Radio producer Paul Quinn approached Kneale with the idea of making a new radio series about Quatermass, and the resulting project was produced and aired as the five-part serial The Quatermass Memoirs on BBC Radio 3 in the spring of 1996. The serial had three strands: a monologue from Kneale recounting the historical environment in which he created and wrote the original 1950s serials; archive material from the original productions and contemporary news broadcasts; and a dramatised strand set shortly before the 1979 serial, with Quatermass being visited in retreat in Scotland by a reporter eager to write his life story. Of the actors who had previously played Quatermass, only Keir and Mills were still alive; Keir took the role, his final professional performance before his death the following year. The Quatermass Memoirs was repeated several times on digital radio station BBC7 from 2003, and the serial was released on CD in 2006.

A live theatrical production of Quatermass and the Pit was staged, with the permission of Kneale, outdoors in a quarry at the village of Cropwell Bishop in Nottinghamshire in August 1997. The adaptation was written by Peter Thornhill and mounted by Creation Productions, with David Longford starring as Quatermass.

All the various film and surviving television productions featuring Quatermass have been released on DVD.

== Themes ==
Nigel Kneale explained in a 1990s interview the background that had led him to formulate Quatermass and the other characters of the original serial in 1953: "I wanted to write some strong characters, but I didn't want them to be like those horrible people in those awful American science fiction films, chewing gum and stating the obvious. Not that I wanted to do something terribly 'British', but I didn't like all the flag-waving you got in those films. I tried to get real human interest in the stories, and some good humour".

Writing in 2005, the television history lecturer Dr Catherine Johnson felt that in the original three 1950s serials, Quatermass as a character represented the championing of science and rationality over the supernatural and the fantastic: "As a leading scientific innovator, Quatermass is invested with scientific and moral authority. Over the three serials, this authority is tested and undermined ... Despite this, the narrative structure of all three serials works to reinforce the authority invested in Quatermass and in science. Although scientific enterprise is responsible for disastrous consequences in the first two Quatermass serials, it is only through science that the alien invasions are overcome ... He is invested with the narrative authority to understand and explain the fantastic events depicted".

The writer and critic Kim Newman went further, explaining in a 2003 television documentary on Nigel Kneale's career that he believed Quatermass to be not only a representation of science but of humanity itself. Referring to the conclusion of The Quatermass Experiment, he commented: "It almost boils down to an editorial speech by Quatermass representing humanity, or the humane aspects of humanity. He talks to the monster, and so the monster is defeated by an intellectual argument or an emotional appeal". Like Kneale, he contrasted this to American science-fiction productions, where the alien adversary would be defeated by "it being blown up or electrocuted, or having the entire firepower of the army turned against it". Hammer had altered their film version of the story so that the creature is in fact killed by being electrocuted.

In contrast to Newman's idea of Quatermass as the embodiment of humanity, writer and lecturer Peter Hutchings in his essay "We are the Martians" sees Quatermass as an isolated character: "In the 1950s Quatermass stories, Quatermass himself is someone who, while working to protect the nation, remains a curiously isolated figure, bereft of anything resembling a meaningful relationship. In the 1979 Quatermass, he has acquired a granddaughter; possibly connected with this is the fact that here he seems a much weaker figure who can only defeat the aliens through the sacrifice of the lives of both himself and his granddaughter". Hutchings also compared this to American productions of the era: "The standard, if not clichéd, figures of the clean-cut square-jawed hero and his girl, which are present in some form or other in most US sf films of this period ... are absent".

== Outside references ==
=== Doctor Who ===
The BBC science-fiction series Doctor Who has often been heavily influenced by the various Quatermass serials, and despite Kneale's dislike of it ("It sounded a terrible idea and I still think it was", he commented in 1986) and his refusal to write for it, unofficial references to Quatermass have appeared in the programme and its spin-offs.

Serials directly influenced include The Web of Fear, The Invasion, Spearhead from Space, The Ambassadors of Death, Inferno, The Daemons, The Seeds of Doom and Image of the Fendahl, as well as the 2007 "The Lazarus Experiment", which echoes the first serial's climax in Westminster Abbey, with the use of Southwark Cathedral. Former Doctor Who script editor and producer Derrick Sherwin admitted on a DVD documentary that the idea of setting more serials on contemporary Earth in the early 1970s was to recall a Quatermass feel. Neil Cross, the writer of the 2013 Doctor Who episode "Hide", has stated in interviews that when he was working on his initial ideas for the episode, he took inspiration from the Quatermass serials, and even intended for the character of Bernard Quatermass to appear in the story. However, it was not possible to gain copyright clearance to use the character.

In episode three of the 1988 serial Remembrance of the Daleks, which is set in 1963, military scientific advisor Alison Williams remarks to her colleague Dr Rachel Jensen, "I wish Bernard was here". Rachel replies, "British Rocket Group's got its own problems". The 2005 Doctor Who episode "The Christmas Invasion" also featured a British Rocket Group, although the organisation was identifiable only by a logo not clearly seen on screen and never referred to in dialogue. It was, however, heavily referenced in a tie-in website for the episode created by the bbc.co.uk Doctor Who webteam. In 2009 television episode "Planet of the Dead", "Bernard" is used as the name for a unit of measurement, and it is explained that this is in reference to Quatermass—whether as a fictional or a real person is not stated.

The 1994 Doctor Who novel Nightshade is about an actor who starred in a thinly disguised version of Quatermass, discovering that the events of the serials are becoming reality. The fictional Professor Nightshade was also mentioned in subsequent novels. Author Mark Gatiss described the Nightshade serial in his notes accompanying the e-book release as "a TV series that isn't quite Quatermass and isn't quite Doctor Who", adding "I was utterly obsessed by Quatermass at that time".

The 1997 Doctor Who novel The Dying Days, set in its year of release, features in one chapter an elderly character introduced halfway through a sentence as "-ermass", and subsequently referred to as "Professor" and "Bernard" during his brief appearance. Author Lance Parkin confirmed in his notes accompanying the later e-book release that this was a deliberate cameo from Quatermass, specifically the John Mills version from the final serial. In the 2008 Doctor Who novel Beautiful Chaos, the Doctor briefly mentions being invited to the Royal Planetary Society by "Bernard and Paula".

=== Parodies and homages ===
The 1956 British science fiction horror film, X the Unknown, made by Hammer Film Productions, was originally intended to be sequel to The Quatermass Xperiment, but when Kneale refused permission for Quatermass to be used in the film, the character was changed to Atomic Energy scientist, Dr. Adam Royston (Dean Jagger).

In February 1959 the BBC radio comedy series The Goon Show broadcast a parody of Quatermass and the Pit, entitled "The Scarlet Capsule". Harry Secombe played his regular character in The Goon Show, Neddie Seagoon, in turn playing "Professor Ned Quatermess, OBE". This was followed later in the same year by a spoof on another BBC radio comedy show, That Man Chester, which launched a regular strand entitled "The Quite-a-Mess Three Saga", with Deryck Guyler as "Professor Quite-a-Mess". However, the "Quite-a-Mess" name and references were dropped after only three of the episodes under pressure from Kneale, who felt a 13-week spoof would be to the detriment of the original character.

In the early 1970s, a British progressive rock group named both themselves and their first album "Quatermass".

A television spoof appeared in a 1986 episode of the BBC sketch show The Two Ronnies, which featured a sketch entitled "It Came From Outer Hendon", written by David Renwick. This spoof starred Ronnie Corbett as "Professor Martin Cratermouse".

Quatermass also appears in a short segment of the 2007 graphic novel The League of Extraordinary Gentlemen: Black Dossier, in which he takes his niece and nephew to visit an interplanetary zoo. Here he is identified as Uncle Bernard.

Andrew Marshall and Rob Grant, produced, directed, and wrote the 2018→2020 BBC Radio 4 twelve-episode series "The Quanderhorn Xperimentations" starring James Fleet as Prof. Darius Quanderhorn — a brilliant, but ruthless scientist keeping the world locked in the year 1952 for 65 years, with almost no-one noticing — in an absurdist parody of and homage to the Quatermass films and television series. Also, they created a novel of the same name released by Gollancz Publishers.
