= Quatermass and the Pit =

British TV science fiction serial (1958–1959)

- The opening titles of Quatermass and the Pit
- Created by: Nigel Kneale
- Starring: André Morell; Cec Linder; Anthony Bushell; John Stratton; Christine Finn
- Opening theme: "Mutations" composed by Trevor Duncan
- Country of origin: United Kingdom
- No. of episodes: 6

Production
- Camera setup: Multi-camera
- Running time: 31–36 minutes per episode

Original release
- Network: BBC
- Release: 22 December 1958 – 26 January 1959

Related
- The Quatermass Experiment; Quatermass II; Quatermass

Quatermass and the Pit is a British television science fiction serial written by Nigel Kneale and transmitted live by BBC Television in December 1958 and January 1959. It was the third and last of the Quatermass serials Kneale wrote for the BBC, although the chief character, Professor Bernard Quatermass, reappeared in a 1979 ITV production called Quatermass.

The serial continues the loose chronology of the Quatermass adventures. Workmen excavating a site in Knightsbridge, London, discover a strange skull and what at first appears to be an unexploded bomb. Quatermass and his newly appointed military superior at the British Rocket Group, Colonel Breen, become involved in the investigation when it becomes apparent that the object is an alien spacecraft. The ship and its contents have a powerful and malignant influence over many of those who come in contact with it, including Quatermass. He concludes that millions of years in the past the aliens, probably from Mars, had abducted pre-humans and modified them to give them psychic abilities much like their own before returning them to Earth, leaving a genetic legacy which is responsible for much of the war and racial strife in the world.

The serial has been cited as having influenced Doctor Who, the author Stephen King, and the filmmaker John Carpenter. It featured in the 100 Greatest British Television Programmes compiled in 2000 by the British Film Institute, which described it as "completely gripping".

== Background ==
The Quatermass Experiment (1953) and Quatermass II (1955), both written by Nigel Kneale, had been critical and popular successes for the BBC, and in early 1957 the corporation decided to commission a third serial. Kneale had left the BBC shortly before, but was hired to write the new scripts on a freelance basis.

The British Empire had been in decline since the 1920s, and the pace accelerated in the wake of the Second World War. During the 1950s immigration into Britain from the Indian subcontinent and the Caribbean was on the increase, causing resentment among parts of British society. At the time Kneale was working on his scripts, black communities in Nottingham and London came under attack from mobs of white Britons. Kneale disdained most science-fiction works of the 1950s as escapist, and he preferred to base his plots on current events. Thus Kneale developed the serial as an allegory for the emerging racial tensions illustrated by the Notting Hill race riots of August and September 1958.

Kneale was also inspired by the rebuilding of London in the 1950s. Huge pits were dug in the process of erecting new structures, and the digs found unexploded ordnance from the Blitz and the occasional Romano-British ruin. Kneale thought: "What if they uncovered a spaceship?"

== Plot ==
Workmen discover a pre-human skull while building in the fictional Hobbs Lane (formerly Hob's Lane, Hob being an antiquated name for the Devil) in Knightsbridge, London. Dr Matthew Roney, a palaeontologist, examines the remains and reconstructs a dwarf-like humanoid with a large brain volume, which he believes to be a primitive man. As further excavation is undertaken, something that looks like a missile is unearthed; further work by Roney's group is halted because the military believe it to be an unexploded WWII bomb.

Roney calls in his friend Professor Bernard Quatermass of the British Rocket Group to prevent the military from disturbing what he believes to be an archaeological find. Quatermass and Colonel Breen become intrigued by the site. Breen has recently been appointed, despite Quatermass's objections, to be nominally his deputy but in reality to lead the Rocket Group. As more of the artefact is uncovered additional fossils are found, which Roney dates to five million years ago, suggesting that the object is at least that old. The interior is empty, and a symbol of six intersecting circles, which Roney identifies as a pentacle, is etched on a wall that appears to conceal an inner chamber.

The inner chamber wall of the object is so hard that even a Borazon drill makes no impression, and when the attempt is made, vibrations cause severe distress to people around the object. Quatermass interviews local residents and discovers reports of ghosts and poltergeists have been common in the area for decades. A hysterical soldier is carried out of the object, claiming to have seen a dwarf-like apparition walk through the wall of the artifact, a description that matches a 1927 newspaper account of a ghost.

Following the drilling attempt, a hole opens up in the object's interior wall. Inside, Quatermass and the others find the remains of insect-like aliens resembling giant three-legged locusts, with stubby antennae on their heads giving the impression of horns. As Quatermass and Roney examine the remains, they theorise the aliens may have come from a planet habitable five million years ago - Mars.

While clearing his equipment from the craft, the drill operator triggers more poltergeist activity, and runs through the streets in a panic until he finds sanctuary in a church. Quatermass and Roney find him there, and he describes visions of the insect aliens killing each other. As Quatermass investigates the history of the area, he finds accounts dating back to mediaeval times about devils and ghosts, all centred on incidents where the ground was disturbed. He suspects a psychic projection of these beings has remained on the alien ship and is being seen by those who come into contact with it.

Quatermass decides to use Roney's optic-encephalogram, a device that records impressions from the optical centres of the brain, and see the visions for himself. Roney's assistant, Barbara Judd, is the most sensitive; placing the device on her, they record a violent purge of the Martian hive to root out unwanted mutations.

Quatermass concludes that in its most primitive phase mankind was visited by this race of Martians. Some apes and primitive pre-humans were taken away and genetically altered to give them abilities such as telepathy, telekinesis and other psychic powers. They were then returned to Earth, and the buried artifact is one ship that crashed at the end of its journey. With their home world dying, the aliens tried to change humanity's ancestors to have minds and abilities similar to their own, but with a bodily form adapted to life on Earth; however, the aliens became extinct before completing their work. As the human race evolved, a percentage retained their psychic abilities which surfaced only sporadically. For centuries the buried ship had occasionally triggered those dormant abilities, which explained the reports of poltergeists; people were unknowingly using their own telekinesis to move objects around, and the ghost sightings were traces of a racial memory.

The authorities, and Breen in particular, find this explanation preposterous despite being shown the recording of Barbara's vision. They instead suggest that the craft is a buried remnant from the London Blitz: a Nazi propaganda weapon, with the alien bodies fakes designed to create a panic. They decide to hold a media event to stem the rumours that are already spreading.

Quatermass warns that if implanted psychic powers survive in the human race, there could also still be an ingrained compulsion to enact the "Wild Hunt" of a race purge, but the media event goes ahead regardless. The power cables that string into the craft fully activate it for the first time, and glowing and humming like a living thing it starts to draw upon this energy source and awaken the ancient racial programming. Those Londoners in whom the alien admixture remains strong fall under the ship's influence; they merge into a group mind and begin a telekinetic mass murder of those without the alien genes, an ethnic cleansing of those the alien race mind considers to be impure and weak.

Breen stands transfixed and is eventually consumed by the energies from the craft as it slowly melts away. A gigantic image of a Martian "devil" floats in the sky above London. Fires and riots erupt. Quatermass himself succumbs to Martian influence and attempts to kill Roney, who lacks the alien gene and is immune to alien influence. Roney manages to shake Quatermass out of his trance, and remembering the legends of demons and their aversion to iron and water, proposes that a sufficient mass of iron connected to wet earth may be sufficient to short-circuit the apparition. Quatermass acquires a length of iron chain and tries to reach the "devil" but succumbs to its psychic pressure. Roney manages to walk up to the apparition and hurls the chain at it, resulting in him and the spacecraft being reduced to ashes.

At the conclusion of the final episode Quatermass gives a television broadcast, at the end of which he delivers a warning: "Every war crisis, witch hunt, race riot, and purge... is a reminder and a warning. We are the Martians. If we cannot control the inheritance within us, this will be their second dead planet."

== Cast ==
For the third time in as many serials the title role was played by a different actor, this time by André Morell; the part had initially been offered to Alec Clunes, but he declined. Morell had a reputation for playing authority figures, such as Colonel Green in The Bridge on the River Kwai (1957), and had previously worked with Kneale and Cartier when he appeared as O'Brien in their BBC television adaptation of Nineteen Eighty-Four (1954). He had been the first actor offered the part of Quatermass, for the original serial The Quatermass Experiment in 1953; he turned the part down. Morell's portrayal of Quatermass has been described as the definitive interpretation of the character.

Colonel Breen was played by Anthony Bushell, who was known for various similar military roles – including another bomb disposal officer in The Small Back Room (1949) – and preferred to be addressed as "Major Bushell", the rank he held during the Second World War. Roney was played by Canadian actor Cec Linder, John Stratton played Captain Potter, and Christine Finn played the other main character, Barbara Judd. Finn went on to provide the voices for Tin-Tin Kyrano and Grandma Tracy in the 1960s science fiction television series Thunderbirds.

For the first time, Kneale used a character from a previous serial other than Quatermass himself, the journalist James Fullalove from The Quatermass Experiment. The production team had hoped that Paul Whitsun-Jones would be able to reprise the part; he was unavailable and Brian Worth was cast instead. Michael Ripper appeared as an army sergeant; he had been in Hammer Film Productions' adaptation of the second Quatermass serial, Quatermass 2, the previous year.

== Episodes ==
No.	Title	Directed by	Written by	Original release date	Prod. code	UK viewers (millions)
1	"The Halfmen"	Rudolph Cartier	Nigel Kneale	22 December 1958	T/5133	7.6
2	"The Ghosts"	Rudolph Cartier	Nigel Kneale	29 December 1958	T/5134	9.1
3	"Imps and Demons"	Rudolph Cartier	Nigel Kneale	5 January 1959	T/5135	9.8
4	"The Enchanted"	Rudolph Cartier	Nigel Kneale	12 January 1959	T/5136	9.5
5	"The Wild Hunt"	Rudolph Cartier	Nigel Kneale	19 January 1959	T/5137	10.6
6	"'Hob'"	Rudolph Cartier	Nigel Kneale	26 January 1959	T/5138	11.0

== Production ==
=== Filming ===
The director assigned was Rudolph Cartier, with whom Kneale had a good working relationship; the two had collaborated on the previous Quatermass serials, as well as the literary adaptations Wuthering Heights (1953) and Nineteen Eighty-Four (1954). The budget of £17,500 allocated for Quatermass and the Pit was larger than that of the previous Quatermass productions. Pre-production began in September 1958, while Cartier was still working on A Tale of Two Cities and A Midsummer Night's Dream for the BBC. As the two previous Quatermass serials had been scheduled in half-hour slots but, performed live, had overrun, Cartier requested 35-minute slots for the six episodes of Quatermass and the Pit. This was agreed in November 1958, just before the start of production on 24 November. The six episodes – "The Halfmen", "The Ghosts", "Imps and Demons", "The Enchanted", "The Wild Hunt" and "Hob" – were broadcast on Monday nights at 8 pm from 22 December 1958 to 26 January 1959.

Each episode was predominantly live from Studio 1 of the BBC's Riverside Studios in Hammersmith, London. The episodes were rehearsed from Tuesday to Saturday, usually at the Mary Wood Settlement in Tavistock Place, London, with camera rehearsals in the morning and afternoon of transmission. Not every scene was live; a significant amount of material was on 35 mm film and inserted during the performance. Most filming involved scenes set on location or those too technically complex or expansive to achieve live. The latter were shot at Ealing Studios, acquired by the BBC in 1955, when Cartier worked with the cinematographer A. A. Englander. Pre-filming was also used to show the passage of time in the second episode; the archaeological dig at Ealing was shown to have dug deeper into the ground than the equivalent set at Riverside, enabling a sense of time having elapsed that would not have been possible in an all-live production.

Special effects were handled by the BBC Visual Effects Department, formed by Bernard Wilkie and Jack Kine in 1954. Kine or Wilkie oversaw effects on a production; due to the number of effects, both worked on Quatermass and the Pit. The team pre-filmed most of their effects for use during the live broadcasts. They also oversaw practical effects for the Ealing filming and Riverside transmission, and constructed the bodies of the Martian creatures.

Made just before videotape came into general use at the BBC, all six episodes of Quatermass and the Pit were preserved for a possible repeat by being telerecorded on 35 mm film. This was achieved with a specially synchronised film camera capturing the output of a video monitor; the process had been refined throughout the 1950s and recordings of Quatermass and the Pit. The serial was repeated in edited form as two 90-minute episodes, entitled "5 Million Years Old" and "Hob", on 26 December 1959 and 2 January 1960. Unlike many programmes of its era that were lost broadcasts, all six episodes survived. The third episode, "Imps and Demons", was re-shown on BBC Two on 7 November 1986 as part of the "TV50" season, celebrating 50 years of BBC television.

Quatermass and the Pit was the last original production on which Kneale collaborated with Rudolph Cartier.

=== Music ===
The music was credited to Trevor Duncan, a pseudonym used by BBC radio producer Leonard Trebilco, whose music was obtained from stock discs. Quatermass and the Pit also used electronic sound effects and electronic music to create a disturbing atmosphere. These tracks were created for the serial by the BBC Radiophonic Workshop, overseen by Desmond Briscoe; Quatermass and the Pit was one of the productions for which Briscoe and the workshop became most renowned. It was the first time electronic music had been used in a science-fiction television production.

== Reception ==
Quatermass and the Pit was watched by an average audience of 9.6 million viewers, peaking at 11 million for the final episode. The Times' television reviewer praised the opening episode the day after its transmission. Pointing out that "Professor Bernard Quatermass ... like all science fiction heroes, has to keep running hard if he is not to be overtaken by the world of fact", the anonymous reviewer went on to state how much he had enjoyed the episode as "an excellent example of Mr. Kneale's ability to hold an audience with promises alone; smooth, leisurely, and without any sensational incident".

Kneale went on to use the Martian "Wild Hunt" as an allegory for the recent Notting Hill race riots, but some Black British leaders were upset by the depiction of racial tensions in the first episode, according to The Times' Birmingham correspondent: "Leaders of coloured minorities here to-day criticized the BBC for allowing a report that 'race riots are continuing in Birmingham', to be included in a fictional news bulletin during the first instalment of the new Quatermass television play last night".

These themes and subtexts were highlighted by the British Film Institute's review of the serial when it was included in their TV 100 list in 2000, in 75th position – 20th out of the dramas featured: "In a story which mined mythology and folklore ... under the guise of genre it tackled serious themes of man's hostile nature and the military's perversion of science for its own ends".

== Influence ==
The serial has been cited as having influenced Doctor Who, the American horror fiction writer Stephen King, and the filmmaker John Carpenter. In a 2006 Guardian article Mark Gatiss wrote: "What sci-fi piece of the past 50 years doesn't owe Kneale a huge debt? ... The 'ancient invasion' of Quatermass and the Pit cast a huge shadow ... its brilliant blending of superstition, witchcraft and ghosts into the story of a five-million-year-old Martian invasion is copper-bottomed genius". Gatiss was a scriptwriter for Doctor Who, a programme that had been particularly strongly influenced by the Quatermass serials throughout its history. Derrick Sherwin, the producer of Doctor Who in 1969, acknowledged Quatermass and the Pit's influence on the programme's move towards more realism and away from "wobbly jellies in outer space". The Doctor Who serials The Dæmons (1971) and Image of the Fendahl (1977) share many elements with Quatermass and the Pit: the unearthing of an extraterrestrial spaceship, an alien race that has interfered with human evolution and is the basis for legends of devils, demons and witchcraft, and an alien influence over human evolution.

Writer and critic Kim Newman cited Quatermass and the Pit as perfecting "the notion of the science-fictional detective story". Newman said Stephen King had "more or less rewritten Quatermass and the Pit in The Tommyknockers (1987)". Newman also wrote that both Colin Wilson's novel The Space Vampires (1976) and its film adaptation Lifeforce (1985) were closely inspired by Quatermass and the Pit; they feature a malicious alien influence on humanity, are set largely in London, and the problem is resolved using cold iron.

After Quatermass and the Pit Kneale felt that it was time to rest the character. By the early 1970s he had decided there were new avenues to explore, and the BBC planned a fourth Quatermass serial in 1972. The BBC did not proceed with the project, and Kneale's scripts were produced as a four-part serial for Thames Television titled Quatermass (1979).

== Other media ==
As with the previous two Quatermass serials, the rights to adapt Quatermass and the Pit for the cinema were purchased by Hammer Film Productions. Their adaptation was released as the 1967 film Quatermass and the Pit, directed by Roy Ward Baker and scripted by Kneale. Scottish actor Andrew Keir starred as Quatermass, the role for which he was best remembered and regarded particularly highly in comparison to the previous film Quatermass, Brian Donlevy. (Note: "Keir also made many films ... most gratifyingly, perhaps, the movie version of Quatermass and the Pit (1967), when he finally replaced the absurdly miscast Brian Donlevy".) The film, made in colour, is regarded by many commentators as a classic of the genre for the way it blends science fiction with the supernatural. In the United States the film was retitled Five Million Years to Earth.

A script book of Quatermass and the Pit was released by Penguin Books in April 1960, with a cover by Kneale's artist brother Bryan Kneale. In 1979 this was re-published by Arrow Books to coincide with the transmission of the fourth and final Quatermass serial on ITV; this edition featured a new introduction by Kneale. The theatrical company Creation Productions staged a live adaptation of Quatermass and the Pit in a quarry near Nottingham in August 1997.

The BBC made Quatermass and the Pit available to buy on VHS videotape in 1989 in a two-part format. It was edited from a 207 minute total runtime down to 178 minutes, largely by trimming comic relief segments. A full, unedited, episodic version of the serial was released on DVD by BBC Worldwide in 2005, as part of The Quatermass Collection box set. Also included were the surviving two episodes of The Quatermass Experiment, all of Quatermass II and various extra features.

For the box set release, Quatermass and the Pit was extensively restored using film from the BBC archives. A process called VidFIRE was applied to the scenes originally broadcast live, restoring the fluid interlaced video look they would have had on transmission, but which was lost during the telerecording process. This was used to digitally remaster scenes for the DVD release.

A Blu-ray edition was released in 2018 to mark the show's 60th anniversary. For this edition, some material trimmed from the DVD box set version for technical reasons was reinstated, and a set of audio commentaries prepared by Toby Hadoke, based on his interviews and archival audio recordings by various members of the cast and crew.

== Parodies ==
A 1959 episode of the BBC radio comedy series The Goon Show parodied Quatermass and the Pit. The episode "The Scarlet Capsule" was written by Spike Milligan, and used the original BBC Radiophonic Workshop sound effects made for the television serial.

The serial was also parodied by the BBC television comedy series Hancock's Half Hour in an episode entitled "The Horror Serial", transmitted the week following the final episode. In it, Tony Hancock has just finished watching the final episode of Quatermass and the Pit, and becomes convinced that there is a crashed Martian space ship buried at the end of his garden. It is in fact an unexploded bomb, although Hancock claims that the warning "Achtung!" is really the Martian for Acton. This episode no longer exists in the BBC's archives, but a private collector's audio-only recording has been discovered, and released publicly on the Hancock's Half Hour Collectibles Volume One CD box set.

It was parodied a third time in a sketch from the final series of The Two Ronnies in 1986: the sketch featured a guest appearance by Joanna Lumley.
