= Quatermass (1979 serial) =

1979 British TV science fiction series

- Genre: Science fiction
- Written by: Nigel Kneale
- Starring: John Mills; Simon MacCorkindale; Barbara Kellerman; Brewster Mason; Margaret Tyzack; Ralph Arliss
- Theme music composer: Nic Rowley; Marc Wilkinson
- Country of origin: United Kingdom
- Original language: English
- No. of episodes: 4

Production
- Executive producer: Verity Lambert
- Producer: Ted Childs
- Editor: Keith Palmer
- Camera setup: Single-camera
- Running time: approx. 54 minutes per episode
- Production company: Euston Films for Thames

Original release
- Network: ITV
- Release: 24 October – 14 November 1979

Related
- Quatermass and the Pit

Quatermass (also known as Quatermass IV, or The Quatermass Conclusion for its limited international theatrical release) is a 1979 British television science fiction serial. Produced by Euston Films for Thames Television, it was broadcast on the ITV network in October and November 1979. Like its three predecessors, Quatermass was written by Nigel Kneale. It is the fourth and, to date, final television serial to feature the character of Professor Bernard Quatermass, this time played by John Mills.

Influenced by the social and geopolitical situation of the early 1970s and the hippie youth movement of the late 1960s, Quatermass is set in a near future in which large numbers of young people are joining a cult known as the Planet People who gather at prehistoric sites, believing they will be transported to a better life on another planet. The series begins with Professor Quatermass arriving in London to look for his granddaughter, Hettie Carlson, and witnessing the destruction of two spacecraft and the disappearance of a group of Planet People at a stone circle by an unknown force. He investigates this force, believing that Hettie may be in danger. As the series progresses, it becomes apparent that the Planet People are being harvested by an alien force rather than transported.

Quatermass was originally conceived as a BBC production, but after the corporation lost faith in the project because of spiralling costs, work was halted. The scripts were acquired by Euston Films and Kneale, who was commissioned to rewrite the scripts into two versions: a four-part television serial and The Quatermass Conclusion, a 100-minute film, intended for international theatrical release.

Despite ITV making the series its flagship premier for its 1979 autumn schedule, the four-part serial was met with lukewarm reviews. Reasons were blamed on the plot, casting and character development. The cinematic edited version, The Quatermass Conclusion, was given a limited release due to lack of interest from distributors.

== Series ==
In the last quarter of the 20th century, the whole world seemed to sicken. Civilised institutions, whether old or new, fell ... as if some primal disorder was reasserting itself. And men asked themselves, "Why should this be?"

— Opening narration (spoken by Gurov), Quatermass, Chapter One: Ringstone Round by Nigel Kneale.

No.	Title	Directed by	Written by	Original release date	Prod. code	U.K. viewers (millions)
1	"Chapter One: Ringstone Round"	Piers Haggard	Nigel Kneale	24 October 1979	FIL-60803	12.4m
Quatermass (John Mills), now living in retirement in Scotland, travels to London in search of his granddaughter, Hettie Carlson (Rebecca Saire), who has gone missing. He is shocked by the scale of the urban collapse that has struck the city – law and order has broken down and marauding gangs terrorise the litter-strewn, decaying streets. The decline of civilisation has been general across the world. Appearing as a guest on a television programme covering the "Hands in Space" project, a joint space mission between the United States and Russia, Quatermass is horrified when the two spacecraft are destroyed by some unknown force. Astronomer Joe Kapp (Simon MacCorkindale), another guest on the programme, invites Quatermass to join him at his home in the country where he and two friends have taken over two radio telescopes. At the radio telescope site, Kapp's colleagues report that they detected a powerful signal at the exact time of the incident in space. Quatermass is intrigued by the behaviour of a group of hippie-like youngsters known as the Planet People, who are travelling to various neolithic sites (about 5,000 years old) from where they believe they will be transported to a better life on another planet. Quatermass suspects Hettie has joined them. Along with Kapp's wife, Claire (Barbara Kellerman), Quatermass and Kapp follow a group of Planet People to a stone circle of megaliths, Ringstone Round. Fearing for their safety, they leave, just in time to look back and see the Planet People assembled inside the circle suddenly bathed in a brilliantly bright light, after which they have disappeared, leaving only a residue of white dust behind.
2	"Chapter Two: Lovely Lightning"	Piers Haggard	Nigel Kneale	31 October 1979	FIL-60804	10.8m
The Planet People's leader, Kickalong (Ralph Arliss), believes that the Planet People gathered at Ringstone Round have been transported to "the planet", but it is clear to Quatermass and Kapp that they have been reduced to ashes. They find one badly burnt survivor – a girl called Isabel (Annabelle Lanyon) who deliriously refers to the "lovely lightning" – and they take her back to the Kapps' cottage. Making contact with NASA scientist Chuck Marshall (Tony Sibbald), they learn that thousands of young people have disappeared in similar incidents at similar sites all around the world. Quatermass, aided by District Commissioner Annie Morgan (Margaret Tyzack), decides to take Isabel to London for tests. As they make their journey, Quatermass speculates on whether there is any connection between recent events and the rise in social unrest. Reaching London, they are caught up in a battle between armed gangs. Quatermass is yanked from the car but Annie and Isabel manage to escape. Meanwhile, a large number of Planet People arrive at the radio telescope, congregating at the stone circle on its grounds. Visiting another site some distance away, Kapp is horrified to see another beam of light strike the area where his home is. Rushing home, he finds his house and observatory badly damaged and his family and friends gone.
3	"Chapter Three: What Lies Beneath"	Piers Haggard	Nigel Kneale	7 November 1979	FIL-60805	10.5m
Quatermass is rescued by a group of elderly people living in a scrap yard who treat his injuries. At the hospital, the doctors are shocked when Isabel levitates off her bed and explodes in a cloud of dust. Elsewhere, the devastated Kapp is left alone in the ruins of his cottage and observatory. More and more young people are joining the Planet People, including the gangs that have been terrorising the cities and the soldiers assigned to keep them away from the Megalithic sites. Contact is restored with Chuck Marshall and with the Russians in the form of Gurov (Brewster Mason). Quatermass theorises that this is not the first time this has happened; megalithic sites such as prehistoric stone circles are in fact markers built as a sign that something terrible happened there, and that there are some kind of alien beacons buried underground at these sites. Quatermass believes there is a sphere of energy surrounding the Earth which can focus itself into the beams of light. The Russians and the Americans send a Space Shuttle, commanded by Marshall, to make contact with the force. Quatermass is sceptical; he suspects they are dealing not with an intelligence but with a machine constructed to harvest human protein. The space shuttle reports a giant beam of light stretching from somewhere in deep space to the Earth, just missing them. A second beam just afterwards destroys them. Meanwhile, the Planet People are gathering at Wembley Stadium in the tens of thousands. Annie and Quatermass travel to the stadium but are powerless to prevent the Planet People from gathering. When they are attacked, Annie drives their car into the underground car park beneath the stadium where she crashes the vehicle and is killed. The lightning strikes the stadium and Quatermass, underground, huddles against the wall to try to survive.
4	"Chapter Four: An Endangered Species"	Piers Haggard	Nigel Kneale	14 November 1979	FIL-60806	11.2m
Showing signs of his recent narrow escape, Quatermass emerges from the car park to find the stadium empty. An estimated 70,000 people have died there. So many have now been disintegrated that the particles of dust in the air have turned the sky green. Kapp attempts to repair his equipment in order to contact the alien presence, but the Planet People destroy his efforts. They try to persuade him to join them but he refuses, convinced now that his family are dead. Quatermass, aided by Gurov, who has travelled to London from Moscow, assembles a team of scientists to find a solution. He deliberately selects old people for the task as they are immune to the call of the alien force. Quatermass decides to fake the presence of a gathering of a million young people at Kapp's observatory and, when the force comes, to detonate a 35 kiloton nuclear weapon. It is a focused charge where most of the force will go upwards, causing little damage in the area. Quatermass does not believe this will be sufficient to destroy the alien machine but he hopes that it will shock it enough to make it go away. Kapp volunteers to stay behind with Quatermass to help detonate the bomb. The pair set up the trap and wait in darkness. Suddenly, Kickalong appears with a group of Planet People, including Quatermass' granddaughter, Hettie. Kapp tries to warn them away but is shot and killed by Kickalong. The light appears, indicating that the alien force beam has arrived, but the shock of seeing his granddaughter among the Planet People causes Quatermass to suffer a heart attack. She has recognised him too and struggling to reach the detonator button, Quatermass is aided by Hettie and together they detonate the bomb. Later, in a world that is recovering from the recent decline of civilisation, Gurov tells us: "The message was taken. It has not come again. We pray it will never come again".

== Cast ==
- John Mills ... Prof. Bernard Quatermass
- Simon MacCorkindale ... Joe Kapp
- Ralph Arliss ... Kickalong
- Paul Rosebury ... Caraway
- Jane Bertish ... Bee
- Toyah Willcox ... Sal
- Rebecca Saire ... Hettie Carlson
- Tony Sibbald ... Chuck Marshall
- Barbara Kellerman ... Clare Kapp
- Margaret Tyzack ... Annie Morgan
- Brewster Mason ... Gurov
- Bruce Purchase ... Tommy Roach
- Annabelle Lanyon ... Isabel
- David Yip ... Frank Chen
- Neil Stacy ... Toby Gough
- Tudor Davies ... TV Director

== Production ==
=== Development ===
Professor Bernard Quatermass was created by Manx writer Nigel Kneale in 1953 for the serial The Quatermass Experiment. Its success led to two sequels, Quatermass II (1955) and Quatermass and the Pit (1958). These three Quatermass serials are seen today as seminal 1950s television productions. Kneale, however, became disenchanted with the BBC and went freelance in the late 1950s, producing scripts for Hammer Films and Associated Television.

The notion of bringing Professor Quatermass back for a fourth adventure dated back to at least 1965 when producer Irene Shubik asked Kneale to contribute a new Quatermass story for the first season of the science fiction anthology series, Out of the Unknown. Nothing came of this but the prospect of Quatermass making a reappearance arose again when, following the success of the film version of Quatermass and the Pit in 1967, Hammer was in discussions with Kneale for a new Quatermass adventure. Again, this did not progress beyond the initial negotiation stage. In the meantime Kneale had been coaxed back to the BBC, writing plays such as The Year of the Sex Olympics (1968), Wine of India (1970) and The Stone Tape (1972). Following completion of The Stone Tape, Kneale was commissioned on 21 November 1972 by BBC head of drama serials, Ronnie Marsh, to write a new four-part Quatermass serial.

Assigned to produce the serial was Dixon of Dock Green producer Joe Waters. Preliminary filming on Quatermass began in June 1973 at Ealing Studios where special effects designer Jack Wilkie and his assistant, Ian Scoones shot model footage for part one of the serial, of a space station with astronauts working on its hull. At this point the BBC got cold feet about the project; it had become concerned about the cost of mounting the production and had been refused permission to film at Stonehenge, one of the locations at which Kneale had envisaged the Planet People would gather to be reaped by the alien force. Kneale recalled that Stonehenge "had become Big Business and the place was like a factory with tourists there from dawn to dusk... they weren't going to let anyone go near it". Kneale also felt that the BBC was unhappy with the script believing it "didn't suit their image at that time; it was too gloomy". In the end, it was decided during summer 1973 that for financial reasons the BBC would not proceed with the production. However the BBC still had an option on the script until 1975, and retained this until it expired.

At this stage Kneale was working primarily at ITV, having written the play Murrain (screened in the anthology series Against The Crowd, 1975) and the anthology series Beasts (1976) for ATV. In May 1977, Euston Films—a subsidiary of Thames Television best known for The Sweeney (1975–1978)—picked up Kneale's unmade Quatermass scripts. This new production, known either as Quatermass or Quatermass IV, would consist of a four-part serial to be broadcast by ITV which would be recut as a 100-minute film, titled The Quatermass Conclusion, for release in North America and Europe. Kneale was dubious about having to craft both a television serial version and a film version of his tale, feeling that "in the end we had two versions, neither of which was the right length for the story". During the rewrites, Kneale transplanted the action at the conclusion of part three from Stonehenge to the more easily available Wembley Stadium. When asked about what differences there were between the Euston Films version and the version originally envisaged for the BBC, Kneale remarked that "the BBC version would have been much more in the studio, whereas the Euston Films version was entirely shot on 35mm film with a great deal of it outside. Much more lavish than either the BBC or I had contemplated".

=== Writing ===
Kneale began writing the scripts, working to a delivery deadline of February 1973. Much of the setting for the story was influenced by contemporary political events such as strikes, power cuts, the oil crisis and developments in the space race, especially the planned Apollo-Soyuz missions and Skylab. Writing in the listings magazine TV Times to promote the serial, Kneale said: "Quatermass is a story of the future – but perhaps only a few years from now. There are some clues already in the most obvious places: the streets. Pavements littered with rubbish. Walls painted with angry graffiti. Belfast black with smoke and rage. Worst of all, the mindless violence". Concerns about the state of society, especially the "dropout" culture of the youth movement, had been a theme of Kneale's writing for some time. This was seen in such works as The Big, Big Giggle, an unmade play about a teenage suicide cult; The Year of the Sex Olympics, about the consequences of a world with no censorship or inhibitions; and Bam! Pow! Zap! (1969), about teenage delinquents, all of which fed into the world depicted in the new Quatermass serial. Kneale said: "I looked at the alarming aspects of contemporary trends. Since then, we'd seen 'flower power' and hippies, so all I did was bring them into the story. It was written in 1972 and it was about the sixties really". Another theme that had crept into Kneale's writing at this time—as seen in Wine of India, about compulsory euthanasia for the elderly, and later the Beasts episode "During Barty's Party", about an elderly couple terrorised by rats—was the consequences of growing old. Kneale later recalled: "The theme I was trying to get to was the old redressing the balance with the young, saving the young, which I thought a nice, paradoxical, ironic idea after the youth-oriented 60s".

Following Quatermass, writer Nigel Kneale developed the sitcom Kinvig (1981) for London Weekend Television. During the 1980s he was courted for scripts by admiring Hollywood directors and producers such as John Carpenter, John Landis and Joe Dante, but with limited success. Returning to television, he adapted Susan Hill's novel The Woman in Black (1989) and wrote episodes of Sharpe and Kavanagh QC. He died in 2006.

=== Casting and crew ===
John Mills was chosen to play Quatermass (the fourth different actor to play the role in four serials on television), who had appeared in significant roles in many high-profile British films, including The Way to the Stars (1945), Great Expectations (1946) and Ice Cold in Alex (1958), and had won an Academy Award for his role in Ryan's Daughter (1970). Mills, whose only previous television credit at the time was The Zoo Gang (1974), was reluctant to take the part but was persuaded by his wife, who liked the script. Following Quatermass he appeared in Gandhi (1982), Martin Chuzzlewit (1994) and Hamlet (1996), working right up to his death in 2005.

Joe Kapp was played by Simon MacCorkindale, who had previously appeared in "Baby", one of the episodes of Nigel Kneale's Beasts series. MacCorkindale was delighted with the part of Joe Kapp, finding it a break from the typecast romantic roles he was used to playing. Following Quatermass, MacCorkindale appeared in The Riddle of the Sands (1979), and subsequently moved to the United States where, after playing a few guest roles on television, he secured a part in Jaws 3 (1983) and the lead in the short-lived series Manimal (1983). He was then a series regular in Falcon Crest (1984–86), Counterstrike (1990–93) and Poltergeist: The Legacy (1999). He then returned to the United Kingdom, where he played the character of Harry Harper in Casualty between 2002 and 2008. MacCorkindale died in 2010.

Barbara Kellerman, who played Claire Kapp, had previously had a regular role in 1990 (1977–78) and would later portray the White Witch in the BBC adaptation of The Lion, The Witch and The Wardrobe (1988).

Quatermass also featured many familiar faces from British television and film in supporting roles, including Margaret Tyzack, Bruce Purchase, James Ottaway, Brenda Fricker, David Yip, Kevin Stoney, Gretchen Franklin, Brian Croucher and Chris Quinten, as well as the singer (and later television presenter) Toyah Willcox.

Director Piers Haggard, who was the great-grand-nephew of author H. Rider Haggard, had been directing since the 1960s. Prior to Quatermass, he had directed the acclaimed Dennis Potter drama serial Pennies from Heaven (1978). Commenting on the script, Haggard described it as "a tremendous re-assertion of the importance of people, ordinary people, and how necessary they are in fighting evil". Following Quatermass, he directed The Fiendish Plot of Dr. Fu Manchu (1980) and the Disney Channel TV series Return to Treasure Island (1985).

Executive producer Verity Lambert had first made her mark as producer of the first two years of Doctor Who (1963). Since then she had carved out an impressive career, first at the BBC with programmes such as Adam Adamant Lives! (1966–67) and The Newcomers (1965–69), and then at Thames Television with productions such as The Naked Civil Servant (TV film; 1975) and the series Rumpole of the Bailey (1978–92). She became Chief Executive of Euston Films in 1979; Quatermass was one of the first productions she oversaw in the role, seeing it as a project to make her mark on the company. She had clashed with Nigel Kneale in 1965 on the BBC arts programme Late Night Line-Up, when he attacked her for making Doctor Who too frightening for children. Despite this she held Kneale in high esteem, describing him as "a fantastic writer... hugely imaginative... considering the impact his work has had, I think he's undervalued". Following Quatermass she produced such shows as Danger UXB (1979), Minder (1979–85; 1988–94) and Widows (1983) for Euston before in 1985 forming her own production company, Cinema Verity, which oversaw programmes including G.B.H. (1991), Eldorado (1992–93) and Jonathan Creek (1997–2004). She was awarded the OBE in 2002. She died in 2007.

Producer Ted Childs had begun his career with Euston on Special Branch (1969–74) and had produced episodes of The Sweeney and its film spin-offs Sweeney! (1977) and Sweeney 2 (1978). Childs saw Quatermass as a big gamble for Euston, out of step with the company's usual fare. Childs later remarked that Verity Lambert "didn't want to come in and just do the same old routine – the kick bollock and scramble action adventure stuff that made the early name of the company". He continues to be one of British television's top producers, responsible for such shows as Chancer (1991), Inspector Morse (1987–2000), Sharpe (1993–2006), Kavanagh QC (1995–2001) and Lewis (2006–2015).

Script editor Linda Agran has since acted as producer of such series as Widows, Agatha Christie's Poirot (1989–2013) and The Vanishing Man (1996).

=== Filming ===
The production took place between 26 August and 23 December 1978 at locations around Middlesex and Hertfordshire as well as London, including Wembley Stadium. The budget was £1.25 million (£6.83 million in 2025), making it one of the most expensive undertakings Euston had attempted at that time. Production designer Arnold Chapkis constructed several large and elaborate sets, including those for the megalithic standing stones at Ringstone Round, the Kapps' radio telescope and observatory, and the decaying urban landscape of London; Kneale quipped about the radio telescope set that "it probably would have worked if they'd just aimed it properly!" Associate producer Norton Knatchbull noted that the serial "was the first 'art department' picture Euston has ever been involved in, in the sense that major sets had to be built on location". This led Euston executive Johnny Goodman to joke: "Our biggest problem was finding someone who wanted the two giant telescope dishes after we finished filming. There's not much demand for such things". One aspect where the budget was less than generous was with the model sequences made by Clearwater Films; Johnny Goodman remarked that the cost was less than James Bond producer Cubby Broccoli "would spend on cigars in a week". Post-production was completed in mid-February 1979. Unlike the original BBC Quatermass serials, which had used stock music tracks, the new serial had a specially composed soundtrack by Marc Wilkinson and Nic Rowley which made particular use of the nursery rhyme "Huffity, Puffity, Ringstone Round" devised by Kneale in his scripts.

== Broadcast ==
ITV intended Quatermass to air in September 1979 as the flagship of its autumn season; advertising posters announced, "Earth's dark ancestral forces awaken to a summons from beyond the stars. The legend returns on ITV – Wednesdays at 9 pm throughout September". However, industrial action began at ITV on 3 August and escalated into a full-scale blackout from 10 August, leaving the channel—and Quatermass—off the air for 75 days. Transmissions were finally restored on Wednesday, 24 October, and the first episode of Quatermass was duly broadcast that night at 9 pm. Episode two was promoted in the TV Times with a full-page article by Kneale introducing the new series and looking back on the original 1950s serials, as well as a lifestyle piece with Barbara Kellerman moving house, while episode four was promoted with a full-page profile of John Mills. Ratings, averaging 11 million viewers over the four-week run, were below expectations; the serial failed to crack the top 20 programmes in the weeks it was broadcast.

== Reception ==
Quatermass met with a generally unenthusiastic critical response. Sean Day-Lewis wrote: "Although Piers Haggard's direction achieves much verisimilitude and the story is certainly enough to command some addiction; I did not feel exactly grabbed; the genre has moved some way since the 1950s and the Professor moves a little slowly for the 1970s". The reviewer in The Daily Telegraph found Professor Quatermass "far too unheroic and unresourceful to carry much interest" while The Times found the serial to be "a so-so affair". John Brosnan, writing in Starburst magazine, found the serial to be "a bitter reaction by a member of an older generation to the younger generation whose apparently irrational behaviour makes them appear to belong to a totally different species. Naturally in the traditions of sf, these failings are exaggerated to the nth degree. Thus muggers and juvenile delinquents become armed gangs and the hippy movement with its emphasis on mysticism, becomes the Planet Church. It's very much a story of Age versus Youth and significantly it's the older people who are impervious to the malign alien influence". This view is echoed by filmmaker John Carpenter who said that "Nigel was very embittered about the way of the world, as was shown, I think, in The Quatermass Conclusion".

Reflecting on the serial, Nigel Kneale said that he was not satisfied with that project. Although Kneale was pleased with the high production values, he was dissatisfied with the casting, believing that John Mills "didn't have the authority for Quatermass". He was similarly unimpressed with Simon MacCorkindale, noting that "we had him in Beasts playing an idiot and he was very good at that". Kneale disliked the depiction of the Planet People, as his inspiration had been angry punks rather than hippies (as evidenced by his portrayal of Kickalong as a gun-toting lunatic who commits multiple motiveless murders). Producer Ted Childs thinks that "the primary problems with it were (a) it was perhaps too depressing a story for a popular television audience and (b) the punters were used to a fairly high standard of technical presentation from American television... And we just couldn't afford that". Executive producer Verity Lambert's opinion is that it "didn't have the staying power of the originals, but then that's almost inevitable when you try to bring something back in a slightly different form".

== Other media ==
From the outset, Euston intended to create two versions of the story; a four-part serial for broadcast on UK television and a 100-minute film, The Quatermass Conclusion, for distribution abroad. While writing the scripts, Kneale was "careful not to pad, because I knew that was the obvious thing, but to write in material which can be removed". There is one major plot deviation between the two versions; in the TV serial, Quatermass is separated from Annie Morgan as they transport Isabel to a London hospital, after Quatermass is dragged from the passenger seat of the moving vehicle by a member of the Blue Brigade. This scene is slightly changed in the film version so that Quatermass manages to stay on board the vehicle with Annie and Isabel, despite the Blue Brigade attack, enabling Quatermass to stay with Annie and Isabel as they go into the hospital. This meant that two versions of the hospital scene where Isabel dies were shot, one with Quatermass present (the film version) and one without (the television version), as well as an earlier scene at the hospital unique to the film version where Quatermass talks on the telephone. As Quatermass is present at the hospital in the film version, it enabled all the footage from the TV serial featuring Quatermass with people at the junkyard, following his separation from Annie and Isabel, to be cut out of the film and thus greatly help in getting The Quatermass Conclusion down to around 100 minutes. There was little interest among film distributors in The Quatermass Conclusion, and it received only a limited theatrical release.

The story was novelised by Nigel Kneale, his first book since his Somerset Maugham Award-winning short story collection Tomato Cain was published in 1949. The novelisation expanded on the backgrounds of many of the characters seen in the story, and added a deeper, more physical, relationship between Quatermass and Annie Morgan. It was this version of the story with which Kneale was most pleased.

The Quatermass Conclusion was released on VHS videotape in 1985 while the complete four-part Quatermass serial was released in 1994. Quatermass, along with The Quatermass Conclusion was released on region 2 DVD in 2003 by Clearvision in a three disc boxset; extras included a Sci-Fi Channel interview with Nigel Kneale and extensive production notes. A two disc region 1 DVD of Quatermass was released by A&E Home Entertainment in 2005, and contained both the television and film versions as well as a History Channel documentary about Stonehenge. In July 2015, Network Distributing released the series on Blu-ray disc for the first time, remastered from the original 35mm film negatives. Network simultaneously released the series as a remastered DVD set. Both sets (Region B/Region 2 respectively) also contain The Quatermass Conclusion film, also remastered and presented in its original theatrical aspect ratio.
