= The Quatermass Experiment =

British TV science-fiction serial (1953, 2005)

- Opening title card
- Created by: Nigel Kneale
- Starring: Reginald Tate
- Opening theme: "Mars, Bringer of War" by Gustav Holst
- Ending theme: "Inhumanity" by Trevor Duncan
- Country of origin: United Kingdom
- No. of episodes: 6 (4 missing)

Production
- Camera setup: Multi-camera
- Running time: Approx. 30 minutes per episode

Original release
- Network: BBC
- Release: 18 July – 22 August 1953

Related
- Quatermass II

The Quatermass Experiment is a British science fiction serial written by Nigel Kneale and broadcast by BBC Television during the summer of 1953. It was re-staged by BBC Four in 2005. Set in the near future against the background of a British space programme, it tells the story of the first crewed flight into space, supervised by Professor Bernard Quatermass of the British Experimental Rocket Group.

When the spaceship that carries the first successful crew returns to Earth, two of the three astronauts are missing, and the third – Victor Carroon – is behaving strangely. It eventually becomes apparent that an alien presence entered the rocket during its flight, and Quatermass and his associates must prevent the alien from destroying the world.

Originally comprising six half-hour episodes, it was the first science fiction production to be written especially for a British adult television audience. The serial was the first of four Quatermass productions to be screened on British television between 1953 and 1979. It was transmitted live from the BBC's original television studios at Alexandra Palace in north London, one of the final productions before BBC television drama moved to west London.

Only two episodes survive in the archives, as the other four were not recorded during their live broadcast. In addition to spawning various remakes and sequels, The Quatermass Experiment inspired much of the television science fiction that succeeded it, particularly in the United Kingdom, where it influenced successful series such as Doctor Who and Sapphire and Steel. It also influenced successful Hollywood films such as 2001: A Space Odyssey (1968) and Alien (1979).

== Plot ==
The three crewmen of a new rocketship have become the first humans to travel into space. On Earth, Professor Bernard Quatermass and his laboratory assistants anxiously await the travelers' return. The rocket had overshot its orbit and had been feared to have been lost. Eventually, it was detected by radar. The ship returns to Earth and crash-lands in Wimbledon, London.

Quatermass and his team, led by chief assistant Paterson (played by Hugh Kelly), reach the rocket crash site and open the vehicle. They see only one crewmember, Victor Carroon. The other two space suits are empty. The spaceship's door was unopened during the flight. No one knows that an alien now inhabits the body of Carroon and has physically absorbed the other two crew members.

Carroon is gravely ill. Rocket Group doctor Briscoe (John Glen) and Carroon's wife Judith (Isabel Dean) are lovers. Journalist James Fullalove (Paul Whitsun-Jones) and Scotland Yard's Inspector Lomax (Ian Colin) want to find the details. Gangsters kidnap Carroon, to ransom him back to the British Rocket Group. He kills them and escapes; his body is mutating into a plant-like alien organism.

Carroon rapidly transforms. The police chase him across London. Quatermass analyses samples in a lab and realises that the alien's spores will consume all life on Earth. A television crew at work in Westminster Abbey sees the creature. Quatermass and British Army troops rush to destroy it. The creature is too strong for the army's weapons and one hour remains until the creature brings doomsday. Quatermass persuades the three human minds who reside within the creature to sacrifice themselves to destroy the alien and save mankind.

== Cast and crew ==
Following the success of The Quatermass Experiment, Nigel Kneale became one of the best-regarded screenwriters in the history of British television. In addition to the various Quatermass spin-offs and sequels, he wrote acclaimed productions such as Nineteen Eighty-Four (1954) and The Stone Tape (1972). A tribute article by writer and admirer Mark Gatiss, published on the BBC News Online website shortly after Kneale's death in 2006, praised his contribution to British television history: "He is amongst the greats—he is absolutely as important as Dennis Potter, as David Mercer, as Alan Bleasdale, as Alan Bennett".

Kneale's actions were represented on screen in the final episode of The Quatermass Experiment. He manipulated the monster seen in Westminster Abbey at the climax, with his hands stuck through a photographic blow-up of the interior of the Abbey. The monster actually consisted of gloves covered in various plant and other materials, prepared by Kneale and his girlfriend (and future wife) Judith Kerr. The couple kept the gloves as a memento, and still owned them fifty years later, when Kneale wore them again in a television documentary about his career.

Rudolph Cartier had emigrated from Germany in the 1930s to escape its Nazi regime, and joined the staff of the BBC the year before The Quatermass Experiment was made. He collaborated with Kneale on several further productions, and became a major figure in the British television industry. He directed important productions such as Kneale's Nineteen Eighty-Four adaptation, the two further BBC Quatermass serials, and one-off plays such as Cross of Iron (1961) and Lee Oswald: Assassin (1966). His 1994 obituary in The Times praised his contribution to 1950s television drama: "At a time when studio productions were usually as static as the conventional theatre, he was widely respected for a creative contribution to British television drama which gave it a new dimension". The same piece also named The Quatermass Experiment as a high point in his career, calling the serial "a landmark in British television drama as much for its visual imagination as for its ability to shock and disturb".

Quatermass was played by the experienced Reginald Tate, who had appeared in various films, including The Way Ahead (1944). He died two years later, while preparing to take the role of the Professor again in Quatermass II. Tate was the second choice for the part; Cartier had previously offered it to André Morell, who declined the role. Morell did later play Quatermass in the third instalment of the series, Quatermass and the Pit. Victor Carroon was played by Scottish actor Duncan Lamont, who later appeared in the film Mutiny on the Bounty (1962), and as a different character in the film adaptation of Quatermass and the Pit (1967). He enjoyed working on The Quatermass Experiment so much that, although he was not required for the final episode, he went to Alexandra Palace to lend moral support. While there, he helped Kneale and Kerr to prepare their 'monster' prop.

Appearing in a small role as a drunk was Wilfrid Brambell, who later appeared as a tramp in Quatermass II. Brambell, who also appeared in Cartier and Kneale's production of Nineteen Eighty-Four, later became widely known for his roles in the sitcom Steptoe and Son (1962–74) and the film A Hard Day's Night (1964). The 74-year-old actress Katie Johnson played a supporting part; she later became well known and won a British Film Award for her role as the landlady Mrs. Louisa Wilberforce in the film The Ladykillers (1955).

== Episodes ==
No.	Title	Directed by	Written by	Original release date	UK viewers (millions)
1	"Contact Has Been Established"	Rudolph Cartier	Nigel Kneale	18 July 1953	3.4
2	"Persons Reported Missing"	Rudolph Cartier	Nigel Kneale	25 July 1953	3.5
3	"Very Special Knowledge"	Rudolph Cartier	Nigel Kneale	1 August 1953	3.2
4	"Believed to Be Suffering"	Rudolph Cartier	Nigel Kneale	8 August 1953	4.4
5	"An Unidentified Species"	Rudolph Cartier	Nigel Kneale	15 August 1953	4.1
6	"State of Emergency"	Rudolph Cartier	Nigel Kneale	22 August 1953	5.0

== Production ==
The serial was written by BBC television drama writer Nigel Kneale, who had been an actor and an award-winning fiction writer before joining the BBC. The BBC's Head of Television Drama, Michael Barry, had committed most of his original script budget for the year to employing Kneale. An interest in science, particularly the idea of 'science going bad', led Kneale to write The Quatermass Experiment. The project originated when a gap formed in the BBC's schedules for a six-week serial to run on Saturday nights during the summer of 1953, and Kneale's idea was to fill it with "a mystifying, rather than horrific" storyline.

Rudolph Cartier, one of the BBC's best-regarded directors, directed the serial. He and Kneale had collaborated on the play Arrow to the Heart, and worked closely on the initial storyline to make it suit the television production methods of the time. Kneale claimed to have picked his leading character's unusual last name at random from a London telephone directory. He chose the character's first name, Bernard, in honour of astronomer Bernard Lovell. The working titles for the production were The Unbegotten and Bring Something Back...!, the latter a line of dialogue spoken in the second episode. Kneale had not finished scripting the serial's final two episodes before the first episode was broadcast. The production had an overall budget of just under £4000. The theme music used was the BBC Symphony Orchestra's 1945 recording of "Mars, Bringer of War" from Gustav Holst's The Planets, conducted by Adrian Boult.

Each episode was rehearsed from Monday to Friday at the Student Movement House on Gower Street in London, with camera rehearsals taking place all day on Saturday before transmission. The episodes were then transmitted live—with a few pre-filmed 35mm film inserts shot before and during the rehearsal period—from Studio A of the BBC's original television studios at Alexandra Palace in London. It was one of the last major dramas to be broadcast from the Palace, as the majority of television production was soon to transfer to Lime Grove Studios, and it was made using the BBC's oldest television cameras, the Emitrons, installed with the opening of the Alexandra Palace studios in 1936. These cameras gave a (by modern standards) poor-quality picture, with areas of black and white shading across portions of the image.

The Quatermass Experiment was transmitted weekly on Saturday night from 18 July to 22 August 1953. Episode one ("Contact Has Been Established") was scheduled from 8.15 to 8.45 p.m.; episode two ("Persons Reported Missing"), 8.25–8.55 p.m.; episodes three and four ("Very Special Knowledge" and "Believed to be Suffering"), 8.45–9.15 p.m.; and the final two episodes ("An Unidentified Species" and "State of Emergency") from 9.00 to 9.30 p.m. Due to the live performances, each episode overran its slot slightly, from two minutes (episode four) to six (episode six). The long overrun of the final episode was caused by a temporary break in transmission to replace a failing microphone. Kneale later claimed that the BBC's transmission controllers had threatened to take them off the air during one significant overrun, to which Cartier replied, "Just let them try!" Some BBC documentation suggests that at least one transmitter region did cut short the broadcast of the final episode.

The BBC intended that each episode be telerecorded onto 35mm film, a relatively new process that allowed for the preservation of live television broadcasts. Sale of the serial had been provisionally agreed upon with the Canadian Broadcasting Corporation, and Cartier wanted the material available to use for trailers and recaps. Only poor-quality copies of the first two episodes were recorded before the idea was abandoned, although the first of these was later shown in Canada. During the telerecording of the second episode, an insect landed on the screen being filmed, and can be seen on the image for several minutes. It is highly unlikely that material from the third to sixth episodes of the serial will ever be recovered to the BBC's archives. The two existing episodes are the oldest surviving examples of a multi-episodic British drama production, and some of the earliest existing examples of British television drama at all, with only a few earlier one-off plays surviving.

In November 1953, it was suggested that the existing two episodes could be combined and followed with a condensed live production of the latter part of the story for a special Christmas omnibus repeat of the serial. This idea was later abandoned. Although Cartier and star Reginald Tate were keen to make an all-film omnibus version for television, this also did not come to fruition. In 1963, one of the existing episodes was selected as a representative of early British programming for the Festival of World Television at the National Film Theatre in London.

== Reception and influence ==
The Quatermass Experiment achieved favourable viewing figures in 1953, opening with an estimated audience of 3.4 million for the first episode, increasing to 5 million for the sixth and final episode, and averaging 3.9 million for the entire serial. The Times estimated that one year before The Quatermass Experiment was broadcast, in August 1952, the total television audience consisted of about 4 million people. In March of that year, the BBC estimated that an average of 2.25 million people watched BBC programmes each evening.

In 1954 Cecil McGivern, the Controller of Programmes at BBC Television, referred to the success of the serial in a memo discussing the impending launch of a new commercial television channel, ending the BBC's monopoly: "Had competitive television been in existence then, we would have killed it every Saturday night while The Quatermass Experiment lasted. We are going to need many more 'Quatermass Experiment' programmes". Following Kneale's death in 2006, film historian Robert Simpson said that the serial had been "event television, emptying the streets and pubs for the six weeks of its duration". When the digital television channel BBC Four remade the serial in 2005, the channel's controller, Janice Hadlow, described the original as "one of the first 'must-watch' TV experiences that inspired the water cooler chat of its day".

Viewers' responses were generally positive. Letters praising the production were sent to the BBC's listings magazine, the Radio Times, while the writer and producer were also applauded by readers of TV News magazine, which nominated them for one of the publication's "TV Bouquet" awards. Looking back at The Quatermass Experiment in a 1981 article for The Times, journalist Geoffrey Wansell highlighted the finale:

Westminster Abbey undoubtedly dominated television during the summer of 1953 but it was not just the Coronation of the Queen that sticks in my mind now. It is also the memory of Professor Bernard Quatermass grappling with the pulsating giant plant that threatened to destroy the world from its rooting place in the Abbey's nave… The Quatermass Experiment frightened the life out of a vast new generation of television viewers whose sets had been acquired in order to watch the Coronation… Quatermass was one of the first series on British television to make life seem potentially terrifying.

Subsequent audience research showed that technical problems interrupting the final episode's broadcast had a negative impact on audiences' views of the serial; the audience felt that the climax had been spoiled.

Despite such problems—and the existence of only the first two episodes in the archives—The Quatermass Experiment continued to earn critical praise in the decades following its transmission. The British Film Institute's "Screenonline" website describes the serial as "one of the most influential series of the 1950s", adding that "with its originality, mass appeal and dynamism, The Quatermass Experiment became a landmark of science fiction and the cornerstone of the genre on British television". The website of the Museum of Broadcast Communications praises the serial's underlying themes as its most effective feature: "The Quatermass Experiment's depiction of an Englishman's transformation into an alienated monster dramatized a new range of gendered fears about Britain's postwar and post-colonial security. As a result, or perhaps simply because of Kneale and Cartier's effective combination of science fiction and poignant melodrama, audiences were captivated". The website also points to the programme's influence on the British science-fiction television productions that followed, claiming that "with [The Quatermass Experiment] began a British tradition of science fiction television which runs in various forms from Quatermass to A for Andromeda to Blake's 7, and from Doctor Who to Red Dwarf".

Kneale disliked Doctor Who - the most successful of the British science-fiction programmes - saying that it had stolen his ideas. An article for The Daily Telegraph in 2005 described Doctor Who as the "spiritual successor" to the Quatermass serials, and Mark Gatiss, a scriptwriter for Doctor Who, wrote of his admiration of Kneale in an article for The Guardian in 2006: "Kneale wrote that [1953] was 'an over-confident year' and he piloted his hugely influential tale like a rocket into the drab schedules of Austerity Britain… What sci-fi piece of the past 50 years doesn't owe Kneale a huge debt?"

In 2007, Gatiss appeared as the character Professor Lazarus in the Doctor Who episode "The Lazarus Experiment". The Radio Times noted in its preview of the episode that "tonight's story is an enjoyable synthesis of She, The Fly and The Quatermass Experiment—even down to the final battle in a London cathedral".

The Quatermass Experiment was an influence on Rebellion Developments' 2025 videogame Atomfall.

== Other media ==
The popularity of The Quatermass Experiment gained the attention of the film industry, and Hammer Film Productions quickly purchased the rights to make an adaptation. It was released in 1955, and starred the American actor Brian Donlevy, supported by the English actor Jack Warner, with Val Guest directing and co-writing the screenplay. Nigel Kneale was unhappy with the result, and was especially displeased with the casting of Donlevy as Quatermass: "[Donlevy] was then really on the skids and didn't care what he was doing. He took very little interest in the making of the films or in playing the part. It was a case of take the money and run. Or in the case of Mr Donlevy, waddle". The film was titled The Quatermass Xperiment to emphasise its X-certificate status. In America the film was renamed The Creeping Unknown after the title Shock! was considered for that territory, and an alternative opening title sequence with that name was prepared.

The BBC was also pleased with the success of The Quatermass Experiment and in 1955 a sequel, Quatermass II, was broadcast, with John Robinson in the title role following Tate's death. This was followed in 1958 by Quatermass and the Pit, and both serials also had feature film versions made by Hammer. The character returned to television in a 1979 serial, simply titled Quatermass, for Thames Television.

A script book of The Quatermass Experiment, containing several production stills from the missing episodes, was published by Penguin Books in 1959. To coincide with the broadcast of the Thames serial, it was republished in 1979 with a new introduction by Kneale.

In April 2005, BBC Worldwide released a boxed set of all their Quatermass material on DVD, containing digitally restored versions of the two existing episodes of The Quatermass Experiment, the two subsequent BBC serials, and various extra material, including PDF files of photocopies of the original scripts for episodes three to six, but the quality of these photocopies is in some cases quite poor. The missing episodes were also semi-reconstructed using production stills, with subtitles to describe the actions depicted in the photographs.

On 2 April 2005, the digital television channel BBC Four broadcast a live remake of the serial, abridged to a single special, also entitled The Quatermass Experiment.

On 9 September 2023, a live script-reading production of The Quatermass Experiment was staged at Alexandra Palace in London, with Mark Gatiss playing the role of Quatermass.
