= The Devil-Ship Pirates =

1964 British film by Don Sharp

- UK theatrical poster
- Directed by: Don Sharp
- Screenplay by: Jimmy Sangster
- Produced by: Anthony Nelson Keys
- Starring: Christopher Lee; Andrew Keir; John Cairney; Duncan Lamont
- Cinematography: Michael Reed
- Edited by: James Needs
- Music by: Gary Hughes
- Color process: Eastman Color
- Production companies: Associated British Pictures Corporation; Hammer Film Productions
- Distributed by: Warner-Pathé Distributors (UK); Columbia (USA)
- Release dates: May 1964; (US); August 9, 1964 (UK)
- Running time: 86 minutes
- Country: United Kingdom
- Language: English

The Devil-Ship Pirates is a 1964 British pirate adventure film directed by Don Sharp.

The film was the first of several collaborations between Don Sharp and star Christopher Lee.

== Plot ==
A pirate ship, involved in 1588 battles on the side of the Spanish Armada, suffers extensive damage and must put into a village on the British coast for repairs.

The village is small and isolated. The Spanish convince the villagers that the English fleet has been defeated and that they, the Spanish, are now their masters. This results in the villagers' sullen cooperation, but rumours and unrest begin to spread and soon the Spanish pirates find themselves facing a revolt.

== Cast ==
- Christopher Lee as Captain Robeles
- Andrew Keir as Tom
- John Cairney as Harry
- Duncan Lamont as The Bosun
- Michael Ripper as Pepe
- Ernest Clark as Sir Basil
- Barry Warren as Manuel
- Suzan Farmer as Angela
- Natasha Pyne as Jane
- Annette Whiteley as Meg
- Charles Houston as Antonio
- Philip Latham as Miller
- Harry Locke as Bragg
- Leonard Fenton as Quintana
- Jack Rodney as Mandrake
- Barry Linehan as Gustavo
- Bruce Beeby as Pedro
- Michael Peake as Grande
- Johnny Briggs as Pablo
- Michael Newport as Smiler
- Peter Howell as The Vicar
- June Ellis as Mrs. Blake

== Production ==
=== Development ===
In the early 1960s Hammer Films were best known for their horror movies, but they also tried other genres. The studio made a swashbuckler, The Pirates of Blood River (1962), written by Jimmy Sangster and starring Christopher Lee; it was a success at the box office, so Hammer commissioned Sangster to write another pirate-themed story for Lee, The Devil Ship Pirates. "The idea was to release these bloody-but-not-too- bloody adventure films during school holidays, and they made a fortune on them," said Don Sharp, who would direct Devil Ship.

The film was part of a new slate of eight films James Carreras announced in July 1963 that Hammer would make, others including Quatermass and the Pit, She, Blood of the Foreign Legion, Brainstorm (which became Fear in the Night), The Evil of Frankenstein, The Curse of the Mummy's Tomb, and The Secret of Blood Island. Most of these were not made until later and Blood of the Foreign Legion was never made at all.

Don Sharp had just directed his first feature for Hammer, Kiss of the Vampire and was invited back to work at the studio by Tony Hinds. Sharp says the film was aimed at the school holiday market so it needed to have a "U" certificate. "But they wanted it to look like a X film. So we had an action film with kids in it," said Sharp.

It was the first time Sharp had worked with Christopher Lee. The director had seen several of Lee's performances "and I was worried about a range I saw as playing down one line. But right from our first meeting we got on and when we talked it was two actors talking. We'd explore his character and I found myself suggesting depths to Captain Roebles that I hadn't expected I'd be able to. Chris is tremendously professional and can essay roles that are charming and threatening at the same time - he has a lovely stillness about him. He’s a very commanding presence." Lee received top billing for the first time in films.

=== Shooting ===
Filming began on 19 August 1963 at Bray Studios in Berkshire and took place until mid October. Sharp did not get along particularly well with producer Anthony Nelson Keys who he called "a general manager type and any idea he had was most obvious. I remember him telling me that he wanted Christopher Lee's pirate to be clad in blue and I said, ‘A blue pirate. Tony? What shall we call him. Little Boy Blue?’ So he asked me what colour I wanted and I told him grey, which he thought was dull and unthreatening until I reminded him that it was threatening enough for the Nazis!” ".

The outdoor sets were previously utilised for Hammer's The Scarlet Blade, made the previous year. Michael Ripper, Duncan Lamont and Suzan Farmer appeared in both films.

The opening scene was shot in a flooded gravel pit a couple of miles up the road from Bray Studios. On the other side of the road council workers were starting to build a motorway so Sharp had the crew lay smoke to obscure trucks in the background. "Outwitting the M4 was a major part of making this movie," joked Sharp later who said making the film was "great fun".

According to Christopher Lee, Hammer had built a full-sized galleon in some sand pits on a steel structure under the water. Although warned not to have too many people on board at once, one day the tea boat was lifted onto a platform level with the water and too many people rushed over to get a cup of tea. The ship capsized, throwing most of the cast and crew in the water. Lee was on the poop deck and luckily managed to hold on to the rail. No one was drowned or seriously hurt. Lee says he "saved the most valuable article possible: the continuity girl's typewriter. The whole structure took several days to right, so that it could be blown up at the end in a glorious holocaust."

"It was lucky we didn't have a serious accident," said Michael Reed, who was the cinematographer. Sharp said, "The scaffolding went to the bottom and was there for two years with the company who owned the pit still charging hire for it!”

Lee wrote during filming that he thought the movie "will be a first class piece of overall entertainment — colourful and exciting. And it has enabled me to play a tough character for once. | have not been forced into the usual elegant viciousness that producers always seem to require of me. It has been interesting to play a coarse individual, to see how far I could go without fear of caricature or overplaying." In another letter he called Sharp "sone of the most talented and imaginative young directors to have appeared on the British scene for a long time.... I personally have never received better or more intelligent photographic coverage in any picture and, though I say it myself, had more chance to show what I can do with a really rougher part than I had in Blood River, where owing to the incompetence of the director, we were all fighting hard to get our faces anywhere near the camera.”

== Reception ==
The film was released in the UK on a double bill with The Invicible Seven.

=== Box office ===
Kinematograph Weekly called the film a "money maker" at the British box office for 1964.

=== Critical ===
Variety wrote "The production skills of Britain's Hammer Film artisans convert this otherwise routine adventure melodrama into a slightly better than average entry of its genre. The solidity of these physical values, coupled with a dramatic concept that stresses action elements, should override to some _ extent certain story deficiencies and the obscurity of the players to Yank audiences and make the Columbia release a serviceable partner in an exploitation dualer for the maleoriented adventure market. The kids will like it, too."

The Guardian called it "very good fun and should have children sitting on the edge of their seats."

Film Review wrote "good old melodrama from Hammer, with plenty of rousing skullduggery, battles and deeds of valour."

The Monthly Film Bulletin called it a "hackneyed, land-locked corsair yarn, quite well mounted but utterly lacklustre."

The Devil-Ship Pirates is a "lacklustre pirate yarn with not much action and some elements of Hammer horror" according to Halliwell's Film and Video Guide. Richard Harland-Smith says that it is a "spirited romp", but notes that the film's "diet of floggings, hangings and swordplay pushed its 'U' certificate to the limits."

== Legacy ==
Sharp and Lee would go on to make several more films together, including The Face of Fu Manchu, The Brides of Fu Manchu, Rasputin the Mad Monk and Bear Island.

Hammer once announced it would make a biopic of the female pirate Anne Bonney to star Raquel Welch, Mistress of the Seas. However it was never made.

Sharp later recalled that Devil Ship and Kiss of the Vampire "are among the happiest movies I ever worked on. With Shepperton or Pinewood you were one of a number of pictures being made, and if you were on a small budget, you got second or third best. At Bray, when you walked through the gate, everything was on your picture. There was a family feeling about it, and a feeling of pride as well: everyone knew their craft and inspired others."

== Notes ==
- Koetting, Christopher (June 1995). "Costume Dramas". Hammer Horror. No. 4. pp. 8–13.
