= Bray Film Studios =

Film and television production complex in UK

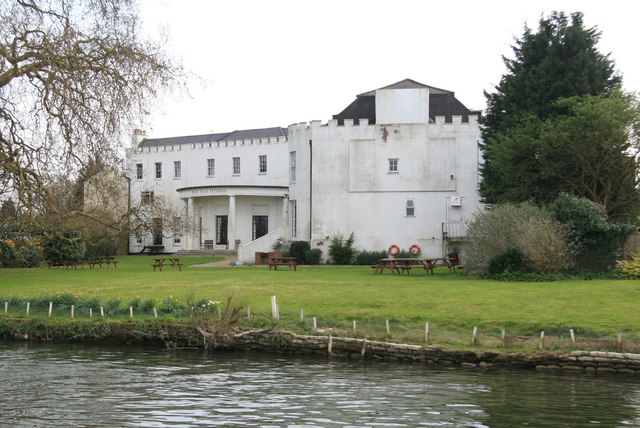
- The studios viewed from the River Thames in 2007

- Location within Berkshire
- Former names: Down Place; Bray Studios

General information
- Type: Film and television studios
- Location: Windsor Road, Water Oakley, Windsor, Berkshire, England, United Kingdom
- Coordinates: 51.491°N 0.677°W
- Owner: Amazon MGM Studios

Website
- Bray Film Studios

Bray Film Studios is a British film and television facility in Water Oakley near Bray, Berkshire. It is best known for its association with Hammer Film Productions.

== History ==
=== Down Place ===
Down Place, also written as Dowan Place or Dow Place, was a large Thamesside house in the Berkshire hamlet of Water Oakley, was built in the 1750s for Richard Tonson, the Member of Parliament for Windsor and relative of publisher Jacob Tonson. After Tonson's death in 1772, the family held onto Down Place until April 1775 when it was put up for sale. When Tonson's estate wasn't sold outright, it was planned to go up for auction on 12 July 1775. The auction of the estate and belongings was postponed until Monday 7 August, and was planned to last for the duration of five days. Sometime after the auction, the house was owned by the Dukes of Argyll and by 1792, it was home to John Barker Church.

A later owner, Mr Hudleston, sold the property to Henry Harford in around 1807. The Harford family continued to occupy the house at the time of the 1901 census. Frederick Henry Harford lived in the home until his death in 1926. In 1932, Frederick Reginald Harford sold Down Place.

At some point after this, the house was owned by the Davies family. Subsequently, the main building largely fell into dereliction.

=== Hammer Film Productions (1951–1970) ===
In 1951, (Note: Other sources suggest 1952) Hammer Film Productions bought Down Place, a location they had used in 1950 to film The Dark Light. The premises were largely derelict, and Hammer used the building's interior for filming before constructing a sound stage on the estate in 1952. The first full production at the studios was the 1951 film Cloudburst.

In 1959, Columbia Pictures bought a 49% share in the studios worth £300,000 (£6,100,000 in 2025); the agreement saw a co-production deal whereby Columbia would produce five films a year at the studios. As this five-year agreement ended, Hammer founder James Carreras sold shares in the company to Associated British Picture Corporation (ABPC). This deal, made in 1963, saw Hammer obligated to move their production to Elstree Studios. At this time, the studio complex of Bray consisted of four sound stages ranging from 1,900 square feet (180 m^{2}) to 5,400 square feet (500 m^{2}); one of the stages contained a 360-cubic-foot (10 m^{3}) water tank. Other facilities included a stills department, dressing rooms, set design and construction departments, production offices and administration departments. Audio recordings at Bray suffered as a result of the studios being within the flight path of Heathrow Airport.

The final Hammer film produced in full at Bray was 1966's The Mummy's Shroud; by November 1966 the move to Elstree was complete. In 1968, the last member of the Davies family left the house and the wing was converted into luxury flats. At the suggestion of EMI, as ABPC had become, Hammer sought to sell Bray Studios. Initially valued at £250,000 (£3,400,000 in 2025), Hammer sold the site in November 1970 for approximately £70,000 (£1,000,000 in 2025).

=== Post-Hammer era (1970–2014) ===
Following their purchase, the premises were renamed the Bray International Film Centre and a fifth sound stage was constructed. Production continued at Bray, including special effects for series such as Doctor Who and Space 1999. In 1984, Redspring sold the complex to the Samuelson Group for £700,000 (£2,300,000 in 2025). Samuelson provided the complex with an investment of £2,000,000 (£6,500,000 in 2025) before selling the site to a property development company who planned to demolish the sound stages and convert Down Place into office buildings. In 1991, television producer Neville Hendricks bought the complex and allowed film production to continue. At this time, the soundstages at Bray were used as a rehearsal facility for large musical events and touring acts, including the Freddie Mercury Tribute Concert and on numerous occasions by Pink Floyd and Roger Waters.

=== Sale (2014–2019) ===
In 2014, Hendricks announced his intention to sell the site, explaining that it was not economically viable citing competition from the studios at Pinewood and Shepperton, as well as Bray's location in a green belt. He sold the complex to a property development company who submitted a planning application in 2015 for luxury apartments and demolition of the sound stage buildings; demolition of buildings at Bray began in 2017.

=== Reopening (2019–) ===
Filming resumed at Bray in 2019 with all three episodes of the BBC's Dracula having scenes filmed at the complex. In June 2020, Windsor and Maidenhead Borough Council approved plans to expand the complex with new studios and workshops.

In July 2024, Amazon Prime Video, which had until that point been leasing facilities at the Shepperton Studios, acquired the Bray Film Studios, where its series The Lord of the Rings: The Rings of Power is also filmed, for an undisclosed sum; the buyer was initially listed as Amazon MGM Studios. The first Amazon production to start shooting at the studios under their new ownership is the second season of the series Citadel.

== List of productions ==
- The Dark Light (1951) (Note: Filmed at Down Place before Hammer had established the full-time studio there)
- Cloudburst (1951)
- A Case for PC 49 (1951)
- Whispering Smith Hits London (1951)
- The Last Page (1952)
- Death of an Angel (1952)
- The Gambler and the Lady (1952)
- Mantrap (1953) (Note: For this production, the studios were credited as Exclusive Studios)
- The Flanagan Boy (1953)
- Four Sided Triangle (1953)
- Spaceways (1953)
- Blood Orange (1953)
- The Saint's Return (1953)
- 36 Hours (1953)
- Murder by Proxy (1954)
- Face the Music (1954)
- Five Days (1954)
- The House Across the Lake (1954)
- Life with the Lyons (1954)
- Mask of Dust (1954)
- The Men of Sherwood Forest (1954)
- A Stranger Came Home (1954)
- Third Party Risk (1954)
- The Quatermass Xperiment (1955)
- The Errol Flynn Theatre (1955) (Note: Although filmed during Hammer's tenure at Bray, this feature was not a Hammer production)
- Break in the Circle (1955)
- The Glass Cage (1955)
- The Lyons in Paris (1955)
- The Right Person (1956)
- X the Unknown (1956)
- Dick Turpin: Highwayman (1956)
- Women Without Men (1956)
- The Curse of Frankenstein (1957)
- The Abominable Snowman (1957)
- Quatermass 2 (1957)
- The Steel Bayonet (1957)
- Day of Grace (1957)
- Man with a Dog (1957)
- Danger List (1957)
- The Camp on Blood Island (1958)
- Murder at Site 3 (1958)
- Up the Creek (1958)
- Clean Sweep (1958)
- The Snorkel (1958)
- I Only Arsked! (1958)
- The Revenge of Frankenstein (1958)
- Further Up the Creek (1958)
- Dracula (1958)
- The Hound of the Baskervilles (1959)
- Yesterday's Enemy (1959)
- The Man Who Could Cheat Death (1959)
- The Mummy (1959)
- The Ugly Duckling (1959)
- The Stranglers of Bombay (1959)
- The Brides of Dracula (1960)
- The Two Faces of Dr. Jekyll (1960)
- Hell Is a City (1960)
- Never Take Sweets from a Stranger (1960)
- Visa to Canton (1960)
- The Full Treatment (1960)
- Cash on Demand (1961)
- The Curse of the Werewolf (1961)
- The Shadow of the Cat (1961)
- Taste of Fear (1961)
- The Terror of the Tongs (1961)
- Watch It, Sailor! (1961)
- Captain Clegg (1962)
- The Phantom of the Opera (1962)
- The Pirates of Blood River (1962)
- The Damned (1963)
- Kiss of the Vampire (1963)
- Paranoiac (1963)
- Maniac (1963)
- The Old Dark House (1963)
- The Scarlet Blade (1963)
- Siege of the Saxons (1963)
- The Devil-Ship Pirates (1964)
- The Evil of Frankenstein (1964)
- The Gorgon (1964)
- Nightmare (1964)
- The Runaway (1964)
- Delayed Flight (1964)
- Circus of Fear (1966)
- The Brides of Fu Manchu (1966)
- The Plague of the Zombies (1966)
- Dracula: Prince of Darkness (1966)
- Rasputin the Mad Monk (1966)
- The Reptile (1966)
- The Mummy's Shroud (1967)
- Moon Zero Two (1969) (Note: Although a Hammer production, only the effects unit at Bray was used on this production)
- When Dinosaurs Ruled the Earth (1970)
- I Start Counting (1969)
- Trog (1970)
- The Music Lovers (1970)
- Sunday Bloody Sunday (1971)
- Ghost in the Noonday Sun (1973)
- Games Girls Play (1974)
- The Rocky Horror Picture Show (1975)
- Space: 1999 (1975–1977)
- Agatha (1979)
- Alien (1979)
- Loophole (1981)
- Terrahawks (1983–1986)
- Hope and Glory (1987)
- For Queen and Country (1988)
- Poirot (1989–2013)
- Ali G Indahouse (2002)
- Fimbles (2002-2004)
- The Roly Mo Show (2004-2005)
- Mutant Chronicles (2008)
- Rocketman (2019)
- Dracula (2020)
