= Die, Monster, Die! =

1965 film directed by Daniel Haller

- U.S. film poster by Reynold Brown
- Directed by: Daniel Haller
- Written by: Jerry Sohl
- Based on: "The Colour Out of Space" (1927 story) by H. P. Lovecraft
- Produced by: Pat Green
- Starring: Boris Karloff; Nick Adams; Suzan Farmer
- Cinematography: Paul Beeson
- Edited by: Alfred Cox
- Music by: Don Banks
- Production company: Alta Vista Productions
- Distributed by: American International Pictures (U.S.); Anglo-Amalgamated (U.K.)
- Release dates: 27 October 1965 (U.S.); 20 February 1966 (U.K.)
- Running time: 80 minutes (Note: The film's copyrighted runtime in the United States was 72 minutes, though its standard running time is 80 minutes.)
- Country: United States; United Kingdom
- Language: English

Die, Monster, Die! (released in the United Kingdom as Monster of Terror) is a 1965 science fiction horror film directed by Daniel Haller in his feature directorial debut, and starring Boris Karloff, Nick Adams, Freda Jackson and Suzan Farmer. A loose adaptation of H. P. Lovecraft's short story "The Colour Out of Space", its plot follows an American man who, while visiting his English fiancée's familial estate, uncovers a series of bizarre occurrences.

The film was an international co-production between the United States and the United Kingdom. It was distributed in the United States by American International Pictures on October 27, 1965.

== Plot ==
Stephen Reinhart, an American scientist, travels to Arkham, England to visit his fiancée, Susan Witley, whom he met while she was studying abroad in the United States. He arrives at the Witley estate, having been shunned by all the locals in the vicinity, where he is met coolly by Susan's father, Nahum. Susan's bedridden mother, Letitia, however, is welcoming of him. She invites Stephen to speak with her, but remains partly hidden by her bed canopy, which obscures her features. She offers Stephen a box containing a gold earring that she says belonged to her maid, Helga, who recently fell mysteriously ill and disappeared.

Over dinner, Stephen asks Susan and Nahum about a blackened patch of land near the estate that appears decimated. They state it was caused by a fire, though Susan adds that no one has been able to fully explain what occurred there. Moments later, the butler, Mervyn, collapses. Later, while Susan brings her mother dinner, she is startled by a cloaked figure that appears in the window. Late that night, Stephen and Susan hear mysterious noises emanating from the basement. When they go to investigate, they are met by Nahum, who nervously informs them that Mervyn has died. Later that night, Stephen witnesses Nahum burying Mervyn's body in the woods. When he follows him outside, he observes a strange light glowing from the greenhouse.

At dawn, Stephen leaves the estate and is followed by a cloaked figure who attacks him in the woods, but the individual quickly flees. Back in the village, Stephen meets with Henderson, the town doctor, who is reluctant to speak to him due to his association with the Witleys. Henderson's secretary informs Stephen that Susan's grandfather, Corbin Witley, died in Henderson's arms, but the circumstances of his death remain a mystery.

Stephen confronts Susan about the goings-on, and the two go to investigate the greenhouse; inside, they discover plants and flowers grown to an abnormally large size. In a potting shed, they discover a machine emitting radiation, along with several large, caged creatures. Stephen finds pieces of meteorite stone that he suspects are also emitting radiation. Susan remarks that both her mother and Helga frequently worked in the greenhouse.

While Stephen goes to investigate in the basement, Susan confronts her father about the discovery they made in the greenhouse, realizing that he has been experimenting with radioactivity to mutate plant and animal life, resulting in dire consequences, such as Letitia and Helga's disfigurements and illnesses. Nahum confronts Stephen in the basement, where he has located a large chamber containing a radioactive meteorite. Upstairs, Stephen, Susan, and Nahum find Letitia's room empty and in disarray. Shortly after, Susan and Stephen are attacked by a grossly disfigured Letitia, whose face has decayed significantly.

When burying Letitia in the family cemetery the next day, Nahum explains how he obtained the meteorite: It fell from the sky, landing in the heath near the estate, and triggered a lush growth of plants around it within one day. Nahum intended to use the meteorite to create a foliage-rich landscape. That night, when Nahum attempts to destroy the meteorite in the basement, he is attacked by a cloaked, axe-wielding Helga. She attempts to kill him, but accidentally falls to her death in the chamber, landing on the meteorite. Nahum, now highly exposed to the meteorite, suffers radiation burns that grossly disfigure him. He chases Stephen and Susan through the house before bursting into flames, setting the Witley mansion ablaze, with Stephen and Susan narrowly escaping to safety.

== Cast ==
- Boris Karloff as Nahum Witley
- Nick Adams as Stephen Reinhart
- Freda Jackson as Letitia Witley
- Suzan Farmer as Susan Witley
- Patrick Magee as Dr. Henderson
- Paul Farrell as Jason
- Terence De Marney as Merwyn
- Leslie Dwyer as Potter
- Harold Goodwin as Cab driver
- Sydney Bromley as Pierce
- Billy Milton as Henry
- Sheila Raynor as Miss Bailey

== Production ==
The film was shot in February and March 1965 at Shepperton Studios under the working title The House at the End of the World. Location shooting for the town/village of Arkham was done at Shere, Surrey, while the Witley mansion was Oakley Court, Water Oakley, Berkshire.

This was the directorial debut of Daniel Haller, a longtime production designer and art director for American International Pictures, who had notably worked on the Roger Corman "Poe cycle" of films.

== Release ==
In the United States, American International Pictures released the film on 27 October 1965 as the first feature on a double bill with Mario Bava's Planet of the Vampires (1965). In the UK, the film was shown to the film trade on 4 February 1966 and released on the 20th the same month, supported by Roger Corman's film The Haunted Palace (1963), which is also based on a Lovecraft story.

== Critical reception ==
The Monthly Film Bulletin wrote: "With echoes of Corman's The Haunted Palace (1963) (a village called Arkham, a script adapted from an H. P. Lovecraft story, an updated version of the warlock theme), Monster of Terror begins on a note which promises rather better things than the latest Corman offering. Stephen approaches the mysterious Witley house, and passes through a landscape which gets more and more tantalisingly weird the nearer he gets to the house. Ground fogs swirl round scarred trees, a black-robed figure flits across the background, twigs crumble into dust at the merest touch. ...But once he gets inside the house, the director, Corman's art director Daniel Haller, has appeared to fill his sets with décor transplanted lock, stock and barrel from the Corman studios. Here are the familiar ornately furnished rooms, gloomy passages and underground stone chambers housing the unearthly secret of the mansion. There are moments, particularly in the greenhouse with its voraciously luxuriant plants and hideously throbbing mutations, when Haller's direction matches the best of Corman. But the leading actors seem a little diminished by their surroundings ... though the indefatigable Boris Karloff is as good as ever, and Terence de Marney is an effectively inscrutable Merwyn. A curiously disappointing film on the whole, never seeming to fulfil the promise which is clearly there."

G. Noel Gross, writing for the DVD review website DVD Talk, writes: "The plodding plot would be more painful if the flick were longer, but the intriguing meld of gothic horror and contemporary sci-fi is hard to pass up".

== Comic book adaptation ==
- Dell Movie Classic: Die, Monster, Die! (March 1966)

== See also ==
- List of American films of 1965

== Sources ==
- Rigby, Jonathan (2004). English Gothic: a Century of Horror Cinema (3rd ed.). London: Reynolds & Hearn. ISBN 978-1-903-11179-6.
- Smith, Gary (2015). Uneasy Dreams: The Golden Age of British Horror Films, 1956-1976. Jefferson, North Carolina: McFarland. ISBN 978-1-476-60530-2.
