= Barbara Shelley =

British actress (1932–2021)

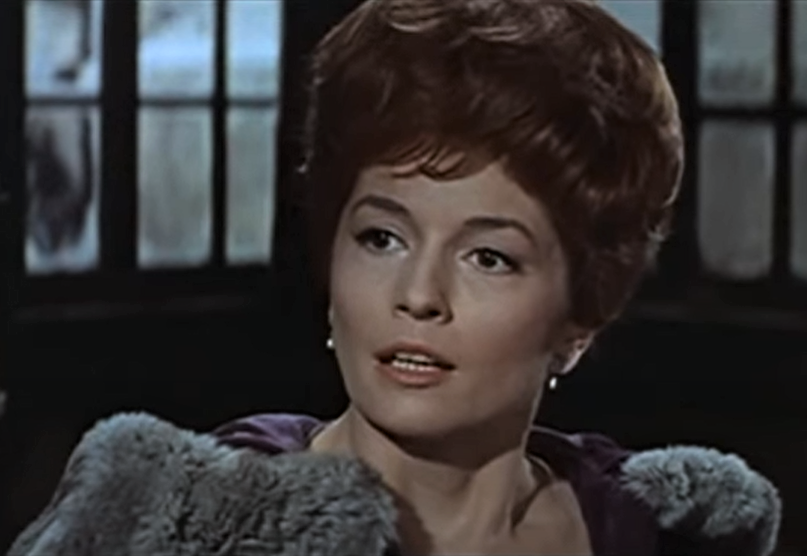
- Barbara Shelley in Rasputin the Mad Monk
- Born: Barbara Teresa Kowin; 13 February 1932; London, England
- Died: 3 January 2021 (aged 88); London, England
- Occupation: Actress
- Years active: 1953–1988

Barbara Shelley (born Barbara Teresa Kowin; 13 February 1932 – 3 January 2021) was an English film and television actress. She appeared in more than a hundred films and television series. She was particularly known for her work in horror films, notably Village of the Damned; Dracula, Prince of Darkness; Rasputin, the Mad Monk and Quatermass and the Pit.

== Biography ==
Shelley was born as Barbara Teresa Kowin at Queen Charlotte's Hospital in Marylebone, London, England, on 13 February 1932. Her parents were May (née Hayes) and Robert Kowin. She had an older sister, Jo, who emigrated to Canada to become a writer and producer for CBC Television. Shelley attended a convent school in Harlesden, north London, where she performed in Gilbert and Sullivan productions and school plays, as well as participating in local Catholic youth drama festivals.

Initially shy on stage, her acting teacher suggested that she take up modelling to gain self-confidence. Shelley followed the advice and started modelling in 1951, which led to an offer of a minor role as a fashion show commentator in the 1953 Hammer Film Productions film Mantrap. She was credited for this film under her birth name, Barbara Kowin.

The same year, she went to Rome on holiday and met Italian comic actor Walter Chiari, who recognised her talent and suggested she change her name to that of his favourite poet, Shelley. Although she had planned a month's holiday, Shelley lived in Rome for four years and appeared in nine Italian films, speaking Italian.

=== Horror films ===
Shelley returned to the UK in 1957, starring that year in the film Cat Girl for British Lion Films. The following year she made her first significant appearance in a film for Hammer, The Camp on Blood Island. She then appeared in the gothic horror Blood of the Vampire (1958), distributed by Eros Films, and later took a number of roles in horror features, including Village of the Damned (1960) for MGM-British, and The Gorgon (1964), Dracula, Prince of Darkness (1966), Rasputin, the Mad Monk (1966) and Quatermass and the Pit (1967) for Hammer. She became the company's top female star and was nicknamed the "Queen of Hammer". Her final role on screen was in the Uncle Silas mini series in 1989.

Ryan Gilbey, in her obituary in The Guardian, praises Shelley's acting in the Hammer films, considering that she had "a grounded, rational quality that instantly conferred gravitas on whatever lunatic occurrences were unfolding around her." In Dracula, Prince of Darkness she starred opposite Christopher Lee, portraying a virtuous woman who reveals to her friend that she has been turned into a vampire in a scene which Gilbey describes as having "traumatised and tantalised" viewers. Shelley considered the later scene in that film in which her character is staked to be among her best work. In Village of the Damned – based on John Wyndham's science fiction novel, The Midwich Cuckoos – she gave a "heartbreaking" performance as one of the mothers of the alien children. In Quatermass and the Pit, she plays a scientist who is taken over by an alien spacecraft, in a scene described by Gilbey as "painfully believable". Although she is known as a scream queen, her most famous scream (in Dracula) was dubbed by co-star Suzan Farmer. In 2010, writer and actor Mark Gatiss interviewed Shelley about her career at Hammer for his BBC documentary series A History of Horror.

While making the 1961 TV film, A Story of David, she met Hollywood star Jeff Chandler, and they began a relationship. Chandler died suddenly the following year. Shelley is later reported to have said that he had been the love of her life.

=== Television and stage work ===
Shelley's television appearances include the first Danger Man episode, "View from a Villa" (1960), plus a subsequent episode that season, "The Traitor" (also 1960); The Saint episode "The Covetous Headsman" (1962); "Death Trap" an episode in the Edgar Wallace Mysteries series, (1962); an episode of The New Phil Silvers Show (1963); The Man from U.N.C.L.E. (1965); two episodes of 12 O'Clock High (1965 and 1966); The Avengers episodes "Dragonsfield" (1961) and "From Venus with Love" (1967); Crown Court (1972); Z-Cars (1973); the television series Prince Regent (1979); the BBC TV adaptation of Pride and Prejudice (1980) as Mrs Gardiner (the Bennet sisters' aunt); The Borgias (1981); the Blake's 7 episode "Stardrive" (1981); the Bergerac Series 2 episode "A Perfect Recapture" (1983); the Doctor Who serial Planet of Fire (1984), and EastEnders (1988).

Shelley also acted in the Royal Shakespeare Company from 1975 to 1977. She retired in 1988.

=== Personal life and death ===
Shelley met actor Jeff Chandler on the set of A Story of David in 1960 who became the love of her life; however, he died in 1961 and she neither married nor had children, living unaccompanied in her childhood home for the rest of her life.

Shelley was admitted to hospital in December 2020, for a check-up. It was there she contracted COVID-19 during the COVID-19 pandemic in England. Though Shelley recovered, she fell ill with other underlying health conditions. She died on 3 January 2021, at the age of 88.

== Selected filmography ==
=== Films ===
| Year | Title | Role | Notes |
|---|---|---|---|
| 1953 | Mantrap | | as Barbara Kowin |
| 1955 | New Moon | Amira | |
| 1955 | Destinazione Piovarolo | | |
| 1955 | Tragic Ballad | Betty Mason | |
| 1956 | Nero's Mistress | | |
| 1956 | Toto, Peppino and the Outlaws | La Baronessa | |
| 1956 | Supreme Confession | Bettina | |
| 1957 | Cat Girl | Leonora Johnson - née Brandt | |
| 1957 | The End of the Line | Liliane | |
| 1958 | The Camp on Blood Island | Kate | |
| 1958 | Blood of the Vampire | Madeline | |
| 1958 | Murder at Site 3 | Susan | |
| 1959 | Deadly Record | Susan Webb | |
| 1959 | Bobbikins | Valerie | |
| 1960 | Village of the Damned | Anthea Zellaby | |
| 1961 | A Story of David | Abigail | |
| 1961 | The Shadow of the Cat | Beth Venable | |
| 1962 | Postman's Knock | Jean | |
| 1963 | Stranglehold | Chris Morrison | |
| 1964 | The Gorgon | Carla Hoffman | |
| 1964 | Blind Corner | Anne | |
| 1965 | The Secret of Blood Island | Elaine | |
| 1966 | Dracula, Prince of Darkness | Helen | |
| 1966 | Rasputin, the Mad Monk | Sonia | |
| 1967 | Quatermass and the Pit | Barbara Judd | |
| 1974 | Ghost Story | Matron | |

=== Television series ===
| Year | Title | Role | Notes |
|---|---|---|---|
| 1957 | Captain Gallant of the Foreign Legion | Gaby | Episode: "One Accident Too Many" |
| 1957-1967 | ITV Play of the Week | Various | 3 episodes |
| 1958 | Solo for Canary | Marie Vazzani | 2 episodes |
| 1958-1959 | ITV Television Playhouse | Sarah/Frankie | 2 episodes |
| 1958-1959 | BBC Sunday Night Theatre | Joyce Penrose/Elizabeth Imrie | 2 episodes |
| 1959 | The Invisible Man | Helen | Episode: "The Big Plot" |
| 1960 | Interpol Calling | Diane | Episode: "Checkmate" |
| 1960 | Danger Man | Louise Goddard/Gina Scarlotti | 2 episodes |
| 1960-1962 | BBC Sunday-Night Play | Jane Lancing/Irene Baumer | 2 episodes |
| 1960-1964 | No Hiding Place | Carole Maitland/Susan Pelham | 2 episodes |
| 1961-1967 | The Avengers | Susan Summers/Venus Browne | 2 episodes, including "From Venus with Love" |
| 1962 | Edgar Wallace Mysteries | Jean Anscombe | Episode: Death Trap |
| 1962 | The Saint | Valerie North | Episode: "The Covetous Headsman" |
| 1962 | Ghost Squad | Margaret Errington | Episode: "The Desperate Diplomat" |
| 1962-1963 | The Third Man | Diana Barratt/Lady Barbara Webster | 2 episodes |
| 1963 | Route 66 | Jeannie | Episode: "...Shall Forefeit His Dog and Ten Shillings to the King" |
| 1963 | The Lloyd Bridges Show | Clare | Episode: "The Last Lion" |
| 1963 | The New Phil Silvers Show | Pamela | Episode: "Who Do Voodoo? Harry Do!" |
| 1963-1965 | Hazel | Bianca Belina/Anna Forti | 2 episodes |
| 1964 | The Human Jungle | Catherine | Episode: "The Man Who Fell Apart" |
| 1965 | The Farmer's Daughter | Pamela | Episode: "Crime of Passion" |
| 1965 | The Man from U.N.C.L.E. | Bryn Watson | Episode: "The Odd Man Affair" |
| 1965-1966 | 12 O'Clock High | Ann Gray/Alice Clyde-Bryce | 2 episodes |
| 1965-1966 | The Wackiest Ship in the Army | Prudence/Christine | 2 episodes |
| 1966 | The Donna Reed Show | Paulette | Episode: "All This and Voltaire Too?" |
| 1967 | Man in a Suitcase | Dolores Hornsby | Episode: "All That Glitters" |
| 1967 | Champion House | Mary Greenwood | Episode: "Blind Spt" |
| 1968-1971 | The Troubleshooters | Various | 3 episodes |
| 1969 | Counterstrike | Elaine Pinot | Episode: "Joker One" |
| 1969 | The Spy Killer | Danielle | ABC Movie of the Week |
| 1969 | Paul Temple | Mrs. Hawthorn | Episode: "Which One of Us Is Me?" |
| 1972-1981 | Crown Court | Delia Savage/Madame Veda Bronski | 2 serials |
| 1972 | ITV Saturday Night Theatre | Clare | Episode: "A Marriage" |
| 1973 | Z-Cars | Ruby Mason | Episode: ""Women at Work" |
| 1973 | Hadleigh | Susan Paige | Episode: "Mrs. Paige" |
| 1974 | John Halifax, Gentleman | Lady Caroline | 3 episodes |
| 1974 | Justice | Aisling Ainsworth | Episode: "Point of Death" |
| 1975 | The Hanged Man | Louisa Galbraith | Episode: "Chariot of Earth" |
| 1975 | Oil Strike North | Elaine Smythe | 12 episodes |
| 1979 | Prince Regent | Lady Isabella Hertford | 4 episodes |
| 1980 | Pride and Prejudice | Mrs. Gardiner | 2 episodes |
| 1980 | The Two Ronnies | Border Guard | 1 episode |
| 1981 | The Borgias | Vannozza Canale | 7 episodes |
| 1981 | Blake's 7 | Dr. Plaxton | Episode: "Stardrive" |
| 1983 | Bergerac | Catherine Prescott | Episode: "A Perfect Recapture" |
| 1983 | By the Sword Divided | Lady Welton | Episode: "A Silver Moon" |
| 1983 | Jackanory Playhouse | Queen of Bardalia | Episode: "The Magic Mirror" |
| 1984 | Doctor Who | Sorasta | Serial: "Planet of Fire" |
| 1984 | The District Nurse | Mrs. Pughe-Morgan | 1 episode |
| 1988 | EastEnders | Hester | 2 episodes |
| 1988 | Maigret | Louise Maigret | TV film |
