= Interpol Calling =

British TV crime series (1959–1960)

- Genre: Police procedural
- Developed by: Leonard Fincham
- Starring: Charles Korvin; Edwin Richfield
- Theme music composer: Clifton Parker
- Country of origin: United Kingdom
- Original language: English
- No. of series: 1
- No. of episodes: 39 (list of episodes)

Production
- Executive producer: Earl St. John
- Producers: Anthony Perry; Connery Chappell; F. Sherwin Green
- Running time: 25 mins
- Production companies: Rank Organisation; Jack Wrather Organisation

Original release
- Network: ITV
- Release: 14 September 1959 – 20 June 1960

Interpol Calling is a British television crime drama series produced by Rank Organisation and Jack Wrather Productions for ITC Entertainment. The programme, which ran for one series of 39 half-hour monochrome episodes 1959–1960, followed the adventures of Interpol policemen Duval and Mornay as they fought against international drug-running, homicide, robbery and forgery.

== Series outline ==
Opening titles voiceover:

"Crime knows no frontiers. To combat the growing menace of the international criminal, the police forces of the world have opened up their own national boundaries. At their headquarters in Paris, scientifically equipped to match the speed of the jet age, sixty-three nations have linked together to form the International Criminal Police Organisation, INTERPOL!"

== Main cast ==
Edwin Richfield and Charles Korvin

- Charles Korvin as Inspector Paul Duval
- Edwin Richfield as Inspector Jean Mornay

Recurring characters;

- Roland Bartrop as Grimond, French police
- George Pastell as Pagano, Italian police
- Guest stars included Mai Zetterling, Patrick Troughton, David Kossoff, Warren Mitchell, Nanette Newman, and Donald Pleasence.

== Episode list ==
Broadcast date is for ATV Midlands ITV regions varied date and order. Production number from PDF summary of episodes on the Network DVD.

| No. | Title | Directed by | Written by | Original release date | Prod. code |
|---|---|---|---|---|---|
| 1 | "The Angola Brights" | Pennington Richards | Larry Forrester | 14 September 1959 | 1 |
When eight men are killed in an Angolan diamond mine to cover the theft of uncut diamonds the trail leads to South Africa, a non-Interpol country requiring local help to catch the killer. Stars Rupert Davies, Philip Ray, and Alfred Burke
| 2 | "The Thirteen Innocents" | Pennington Richards | David Chantler | 21 September 1959 | 11 |
A trading company in Istanbul is a cover for opium smuggling to Vienna but when Duval finds the couriers are racing Pigeons, how can he track them? Stars Patrick Troughton, Peter Illing, and Guy Deghy
| 3 | "The Money Game" | Pennington Richards | Lewis Davidson | 28 September 1959 | 3 |
A journalist is tricked into reporting the false death of a financier throwing the world stock markets into turmoil. When the journalist is murdered Duval follows the money to find the killer. Stars Ferdy Mayne, Walter Rilla, Walter Gotell and Delphi Lawrence
| 4 | "The Sleeping Giant" | Pennington Richards | Larry Forrester | 5 October 1959 | 7 |
A huge unexploded world war two bomb lies at the base of a Scottish dam and the bomb disposal team need information on how to defuse the bomb. Duval has to locate a Nazi war criminal who helped to build the bomb and the trail leads to a whaling fleet in the south Atlantic. Stars. John Crawford, Esmond Knight and Martin Wyldeck
| 5 | "The Two-Headed Monster" | Pennington Richards | David Chantler | 12 October 1959 | 12 |
A ruthless racketeer is deported, on completion of a prison term, from New York to his home near Naples and continues his protection racket against the local wine growers. Bringing in other notorious gangsters from Spain, France, and Germany brings him to the attention of Interpol. Stars. Marla Landi, Alan Tilvern and George Pastell.
| 6 | "The Long Weekend" | Charles Frend | David Chantler | 19 October 1959 | 10 |
Duval's weekend is spoiled when a murdered seaman is washed up off the English coast when he was reported missing overboard in the Mediterranean Sea near Marseilles 2000 miles away seven days previously. Duval and Mornay solve the crime without leaving Interpol headquarters in Paris. Stars. David Kossoff, John Le Mesurier, André Maranne and Francis de Wolff
| 7 | "You Can't Die Twice" | Pennington Richards | Barbara Hammer; Based on a story by Leonard Fincham | 26 October 1959 | 2 |
A seaman accidentally killed in New York has the identity of a man shot dead in Hamburg. Duval investigates concentration camp refugees and a brutal people smuggling operation. Duval employs an undercover policeman to infiltrate the gang from refugee camp to New York. Stars Leonard Sachs, Robert Arden, Cec Linder and Gerard Heinz.
| 8 | "Diamond S.O.S." | Charles Frend | Tony O'Grady and Leonard Fincham | 2 November 1959 | 14 |
A girl posing as well known celebrities to steal from jewellers all over Europe fools Duval twice, to the amusement of Mornay, when he thinks he is about to arrest her. Duval's only clue is the couture dresses she has left behind. Stars Mai Zetterling, Lisa Daniely, Peter Vaughan and Robert Rietti.
| 9 | "Private View" | Pennington Richards | Robert Stewart | 9 November 1959 | 5 |
Six old master's paintings are stolen from a secure private collection in London and the main suspect is a Swedish art dealer. Duval is called to London and his investigation leads to a refugee and his artist daughter, a Camera obscura, a commission to supply paintings for a ship but the main suspect has already left for New York with six paintings. Stars Moira Redmond, Michael Goodliffe, Leslie French and Ernest Clark
| 10 | "Dead on Arrival" | Max Varnel | Max Marquis and Phillip Chambers | 16 November 1959 | 15 |
A NATO courier is found dead on the Istanbul-Paris express. Duval puts his life on the line when he retraces the exact movements of the courier and discovers the courier had met a Paris vice madam whose boyfriend is a notorious Istanbul killer needing to get to Paris to kill a witness in a vice trial. Stars Jane Hylton, Robert Brown, and Lee Montague.
| 11 | "Air Switch" | Pennington Richards | Gil Winfield and Leonard Fincham | 23 November 1959 | 6 |
Tetracycline is being switched for water in transit from the American manufactures and the World Health Organisation depot in Sweden and almost immediately sold on to third world countries. Duval enlists the police of the countries the shipment passes through to discover where the switch takes place. Stars John Van Eyssen, Trevor Reid and Lloyd Lamble.
| 12 | "The Chinese Mask" | Pennington Richards | Lewis Davidson | 7 December 1959 | 8 |
When an airliner is hijacked and landed on a disused wartime airstrip in Burma and its cargo of platinum stolen, the trail leads to Hong Kong and a mysterious Chinese man with many identities who seems to have been killed fleeing the police. Stars Jan Holden, and Howard Marion-Crawford.
| 13 | "Slave Ship" | Pennington Richards | Gil Winfield, Geoffrey Orme, and Edwin Richfield | 14 December 1959 | 9 |
When a sinking dhow is brought into Mombasa, Kenya, by the Royal Navy, with 16 locals, 14 dead from the plague and 2 shot dead, Duval investigates the slave trade of pilgrims from Mombasa to Mecca, who end up in the slave markets of Oman. Stars Howard Lang, Meredith Edwards, Cyril Shaps, Oscar Quitak and David Davies.
| 14 | "The Man's a Clown" | Charles Frend | Robert Stewart | 21 December 1959 | 16 |
Counterfeit dollars are turning up all over Europe and Duval's plan to go to Rome and act as a buyer to flush out the forger goes wrong, but a clue leads to convent school and a clown in a travelling circus. Stars Warren Mitchell, Lisa Daniely, Jean Anderson, and John Crawford.
| 15 | "Last Man Lucky" | Pennington Richards | Neville Dasey | 28 December 1959 | 13 |
A gang member is killed by his colleagues in Paris and dumped in the Seine has among his papers a list with initials and dates of four murders throughout Europe. Duval suspects a Murder Incorporated gang and there is a fifth initial and date of a murder yet to be committed. Stars Annabel Maule, Sandra Dorne, and Donald Stewart.
| 16 | "No Flowers for Onno" | Pennington Richards | Robert Stewart | 4 January 1960 | 4 |
An English writer is murdered in Amsterdam and his notes, regarding the S.S. wartime execution of a Dutch resistance hero and a British army major delivering 300,000 guilders to the resistance, are stolen. Duval follows the end of war records of money being exchanged for new currency to a thriving business with offices in Holland and Germany run by the S.S. officer who carried out the execution. Stars Kevin Stoney, Leigh Madison, Victor Beaumont, Edward Jewesbury and Bruno Barnabe.
| 17 | "Mr George" | Charles Frend | David Chantler | 11 January 1960 | 19 |
'Mr George' is a clever firebug blackmailing a London insurance company by burning down a Hamburg warehouse. Duval urges the insurance company to pay up knowing George would have difficulty changing hot money even in non-Interpol countries forcing him to use the black market in Tangiers where he can lay a trap. Stars Guy Rolfe, Susan Travers, Brian Nash, Martin Benson, and Richard Leech.
| 18 | "The Thousand Mile Alibi" | George Pollock | John Kruse; Based on story by Leonard Fincham | 18 January 1960 | 17 |
When a woman is murdered in Paris and the suspect is being chased across Europe. Duval believes the husband has the greatest motive but he is taking part in the Mille Miglia, a one thousand mile endurance race in Italy, with his brother witnessed by thousands of spectators. Stars Paul Eddington, William Lucas, George Pastell, and Margaret Diamond.
| 19 | "Act of Piracy" | Pennington Richards | Edwin Richfield; Based on a story by John Kruse | 25 January 1960 | 23 |
A phoney U.S. patrol boat intercepts a Danish cargo ship in the Caribbean and steal a million dollars of platinum killing the crew. Duval's investigations via Mexico City leads to Andros in the Bahamas and an ex wartime patrol boat and its owner but he has never left the island and the patrol boat was wrecked three months before. Stars Richard Gale, Alex Mango, Steve Plytas, and Reed De Rouen.
| 20 | "Game for Three Hands" | Pennington Richards | Robert Stewart | 1 February 1960 | 22 |
At an Interpol conference in Montreal Duval spots a man he suspects is a wife strangler that escaped from him twenty years ago when he was a young detective in Paris. The murderer had a tattoo on his right forearm but the suspect has a false metal right arm in place of his own arm lost when he was a lumberjack. Stars Peter Dyneley, Alan Gifford, Russell Waters and Paula Byrne.
| 21 | "The Collector" | Pennington Richards | Wilton Schiller and David Chantler | 8 February 1960 | 24 |
Small time businessmen, shopkeepers, and pedlars all Sicilians throughout the world have been holding money for an American gangster and when he dies they feel safe to start spending the money. They reckon without 'The Collector', an associate of the gangster who has killed in New York, Rome, and Paris when they cannot pay what they owe. Stars Paul Stassino, Leonard Sachs, Richard Leech, Christina Gregg, and Patrick Newell (uncredited).
| 22 | "The Heiress" | Pennington Richards | Leonard Fincham and David Chntler | 15 February 1960 | 21 |
The father of an heiress asks Duval to intervene when his daughter falls under the charms of man known to Interpol for living by his wits and off wealthy women, but no crime has been committed. Duval discovers the man's first wife died in a car accident and his second was nearly killed in another car accident. Stars Maurice Kaufmann, Christopher Rhodes, Julia Lockwood, Donald Morley and Betty McDowall. Note: Footage from the film Hell Drivers (1957) of a Hawletts lorry going over a quarry cliff are used in this episode.
| 23 | "Payment in Advance" | Pennington Richards | Larry Forrester | 22 February 1960 | 25 |
Schroder, a Nazi, has to be released from prison after ten years when the man he had supposed to have murdered turns up in hospital badly injured after escaping from East Germany where he had been a prisoner. Schroder who hates the man feels he can kill him because he has already paid the price. Stars Raymond Huntley, Walter Gotell, and Wendy Williams.
| 24 | "Finger of Guilt" | Robert Lynn | Robert Stewart; Based on a story by Tom Hutchinson and Ernie Player | 7 March 1960 | 26 |
Fingerprints found on a safe at a robbery in Amsterdam belong to Irish safecracker Sash Moran but he is in a London prison awaiting release. Moran knows how his fingerprints got there and heads to Amsterdam under Duvals nose to pull off the biggest robbery ever from a diamond house. Stars Bill Nagy, John Salew, June Merlin, and Howard Lang (uncredited).
| 25 | "The Girl with Grey Hair" | Charles Frend | Leonard Fincham, Michael Hankinson, and Robert Stewart | 14 March 1960 | 18 |
After reports of his suicide in Italy, the price of paintings by artist Hugo Ballard begin to soar. So why at an auction in Paris would his widow Anita slash one of her husband's paintings, 'The Girl with Grey Hair', with a knife claiming it to be fake. Duval goes to Italy to search for the girl in the painting at a village near the place the artist died. Stars Ronald Leigh-Hunt, Mary Laura Wood, Elizabeth Wilson and George Pastell.
| 26 | "Trial at Cranby's Creek" | Pennington Richards | Larry Forrester | 21 March 1960 | 28 |
Duval goes to the Western Australian outback to a small town to collect a prisoner wanted for murder in Belgium only to find he is on trial in a 'kangaroo court' for shooting the local police trooper in the back. Stars Thomas Duggan, and Felicity Young.
| 27 | "Ascent to Murder" | Robert Lynn | Larry Forrester | 28 March 1960 | 31 |
Duval is in a Northern Kashmir mountain hotel at the request of the US Treasury to interview Clyde, a financier whose companies have gone bust in America and Europe. Duval is nearly killed by a booby trap meant for Clyde and has a hotel of suspects. Stars Ursula Howells, Howard Marion-Crawford, Anthony Dawson, John Cairney, Julian Sherrier and Gordon Tanner.
| 28 | "Slow Boat to Amsterdam" | Bill Lewthwaite | Lindsay Galloway | 4 April 1960 | 37 |
Duval's car breaks down in a small canalside village in Northern France and when a piece of platinum is found on the body fished out of the canal Inspector Duval links a diamond robbery in the South of France and the canals of France Belgium and Holland. Stars William Franklyn, Francis de Wolff, Bernard Cribbins and Harold Kasket.
| 29 | "White Blackmail" | Robert Lynn | Robert Stewart | 11 April 1960 | 29 |
A possible organised blackmail racket in a Swiss ski resort is uncovered when two wealthy businessmen commit suicide. Posing as wealthy banker Duval arrives in Switzerland and is befriended by a British girl giving him his first lead until she is murdered. Stars Nanette Newman, Douglas Wilmer, Mary Morris, and Francis Matthews.
| 30 | "A Foreign Body" | Norman Harrison | Robert Stewart | 18 April 1960 | 36 |
When the London police find the body of a French girl in the boot of an impounded American car Interpol is called in. Although everything points to car owner, American, Ben Stack as the murderer Duval is not convinced and he discovers the girl was a nightclub hostess and the owner was deported from America on vice charges. Stars Stratford Johns, John Crawford, Robert Brown, André Maranne and John Chandos.
| 31 | "In the Swim" | Robert Lynn | Robert Stewart and Connery Chappell | 25 April 1960 | 38 |
Lars Lukas, a Finnish cross channel swimmer is shot dead when he comes ashore in England and his last words lead Duval to the swimmer's trainer who regularly travels between France and England following his swimmers by boat. Duval discovers drugs but how and to who are they being transferred. John Horsley, Dorinda Stevens, and Jack Lambert.
| 32 | "The Three Keys" | Robert Lynn | Robert Stewart and Connery Chappell; Story by Paul Erickson | 2 May 1960 | 39 |
A forger thinks he has the perfect plan when he substitutes his forgeries for payroll cash in safes in Barcelona and Zurich but Duval links the safes to a London company and an employee who has left with ill health. Stars Lionel Murton, Cyril Shaps, and Basil Dignam.
| 33 | "Eight Days Inclusive" | Pennington Richards | Robert Stewart | 9 May 1960 | 27 |
A Paris jewel robbery is linked to four others throughout Europe and then another in Geneva when one of the robbers is shot and wounded and a dropped glove gives Duval a clue to an eight-day coach tour. Stars Glyn Owen and Rona Anderson.
| 34 | "Dressed to Kill" | Robert Lynn | David Chantler and Robert Stewart | 16 May 1960 | 33 |
By tricking a seamstress of a Paris fashion house an American photographer plots to steal designer Bernarde's new collection. Bernarde asks his friend Duval to assist him in protecting his designs and Duval installs a private investigator as a model. Stars Hazel Court, Frederick Jaeger, and David Knight
| 35 | "Cargo of Death" | Pennington Richards | Michael Connor and Leonard Fincham | 23 May 1960 | 35 |
Thieves steal a consignment of live cholera vaccine from Chandra Laboratories of Karachi. It is enough to infect 50,000 people and start an epidemic. Duval flies to Delhi, when deaths occur in Bengal, and to the distributors of an American cholera vaccine to account for their stocks. Stars Marne Maitland, Laurence Payne, Surya Kuwari, and John Gatrell.
| 36 | "Desert Hijack" | Jeremy Summers | Robert Stewart and Harold Orton | 30 May 1960 | 32 |
Duval investigates raids on Foreign Legion arms trucks in North Africa and sold to the local rebels. The main Interpol suspect was killed a few weeks earlier in Marseilles but Duval is not convinced he is dead. Stars John Salew, Henry Oscar, Patrick Jordan, Colette Wilde, and Geoffrey Palmer (uncredited).
| 37 | "Pipeline" | David MacDonald | Larry Forrester | 6 June 1960 | 30 |
Duval arrives in the middle of a South American state's civil war to pick up an American oil technician wanted for murder. Duval has to travel to a remote pumping station only to find his man alone struggling to stop the pumps exploding and polluting a river. Stars John Bentley, Richard Leech, Elizabeth Wilson, and Dervis Ward.
| 38 | "The Absent Assassin" | Robert Lynn | Larry Forrester | 13 June 1960 | 34 |
Four international judges from the Nuremberg war trials receive death threats and when the first is killed by a radio controlled bomb in New York Duval heads to Spandau prison and discovers a Nazi war criminal with expertise in boobytraps has recently been released. Stars Donald Pleasence, John Longden, Russell Waters and Frederick Piper.
| 39 | "Checkmate" | Bill Lewthwaite | Sam Neuman | 20 June 1960 | 20 |
Using his girlfriend as a distraction David Baker robs and kills two security guards in Tel Aviv and they flee to Madrid because Spain has no extradition treaty with Israel and are untouchable. Duval makes it impossible for Baker to exchange the stolen money and devises a plan to force him out of Spain. Stars Barbara Shelley, Gaylord Cavallero, and Arnold Bell.

.

== DVD release ==
Network released the series on DVD in December 2010. Episodes 25 and 30 have the end credits reversed.
