= Ark All Saints Academy =

- School logo

Location
- 140 Wyndham Road; Camberwell, London, SE5 0UB; England; 51.4784°N 0.10063°W

Information
- Type: Academy
- Religious affiliation: Church of England
- Established: September 1955; 70 years ago
- Department for Education URN: 139718 Tables
- Chair of Governors: Jonny Smith
- Principal: Lucy Frame
- Staff: 150 staff members
- Gender: Mixed
- Age: 11 to 16
- Enrolment: 120
- Capacity: 600
- Houses: Barnardo, Cavell, Ramabai and Tutu
- Diocese: Southwark
- Website: www.arkallsaintsacademy.org

Ark All Saints Academy is a mixed, non-selective school for pupils which was originally established as a secondary modern school in 1955, and became an Ark school in September 2013 with an intake of 120 year 7 students. The school increased its number of pupils until its maximum capacity of 600 was reached in 2017. A sixth form was planned to open in 2018, with an intake of 120 in each year, however due to lack of funding the project was abandoned.

The school was originally St Michael and All Angels Academy in Camberwell, with a new building opening in January 2014. As St Michael and All Angels, it had been described in The Guardian as "a school out of control", and Michael Gove "held up the school as an example of the government's determination to be tough with failing academies". The school had opened in 1955. It was on the same site as a primary school of the same name which opened in 1884, but which had been bombed during the Second World War and the site had been derelict for some time. Alan Johnson presented a radio series about the school, The Secret History of a School, broadcast in 2019.

Ark All Saints is graded as a 'Good' school after OFSTED inspections in 2015 and 2018. Ark All Saints Academy had its first SIAMS inspection in November 2016 and achieved an Outstanding grade in every category. Since 2017 it has been oversubscribed and at capacity.

Michael Farmer, Baron Farmer sponsors the school.
