= Edwin Richfield =

English actor (1921–1990)

- in The Avengers (1961)
- Born: Edwin Ronald Richfield; 11 September 1921; London, England
- Died: 2 August 1990 (aged 68); Shrewsbury, Shropshire, England
- Occupation: Actor
- Years active: 1949–1988
- Spouses: Jan Holden (m. 1952; div. 1973) Gaynor Stuart (m. 1980)
- Children: 3

Edwin Richfield (11 September 1921 – 2 August 1990) was an English actor.

== Career ==
Richfield starred in the television series Interpol Calling (1959). He was The Odd Man in Granada Television's series of the same name in the early 1960s. Richfield played regular guest roles in the 1960s spy series The Avengers, frequently cast as a villain. He was the only actor – other than Patrick Macnee – to appear in each of the six seasons of the programme.

Richfield's other television roles include: R3, 199 Park Lane, Gideon's Way, Danger Man, Dixon of Dock Green, Z-Cars, Adam Adamant Lives!, The Baron, Champion House, Out of the Unknown, The Owl Service, UFO, Bergerac, Maigret, Crossroads, Harriet's Back in Town, Doctor Who (The Sea Devils and The Twin Dilemma), Crown Court, ("Royalties" episode) and All Creatures Great and Small.

His film credits include: X the Unknown, Quatermass 2, The Camp on Blood Island, The Face of Fu Manchu and Quatermass and the Pit. He alo appeared in Scotland Yard and in The Dark Stairway playing Joe Lloyd.

== Personal life ==
While they were both playing in repertory Richfield met the actress Valerie Jeanne Wilkinson (1931–2005), known by her stage name of Jan Holden. They married in 1952, while they were both appearing in a stage version of The Blue Lamp. The couple had three children together: twin girls, one of whom died from a brain tumour, and a boy, Simon. The marriage broke down in 1973.

Richfield married Gaynor Stuart in 1980. He died of cancer on 2 August 1990.

== Selected filmography ==
- The Jack of Diamonds (1949) – George Paxton
- Ha'penny Breeze (1950) – David King
- Counterspy ('Undercover Agent', in US) (1953) – Safecracker (uncredited)
- Park Plaza 605 (1953) – Mr. Reynolds
- The Blue Parrot (1953) – Taps Campelli
- Flannelfoot (1953) – Bill Neilson
- Stryker of the Yard (1953)
- Conflict of Wings (1954) – 'Smother' Brooks
- What Every Woman Wants (1954) – Frank
- Radio Cab Murder (1954) – Nat
- The Black Rider (1954) – Geoff Morgan
- Devil's Point (1954) – Daller
- Mask of Dust (1954) – Cynical Reporter in Lounge
- The Brain Machine (1955) – Henry Arthur Ryan, thug
- The Dam Busters (1955) – RAF Officer (uncredited)
- The Blue Peter (1955) – Number One
- Find the Lady (1956) – Max
- X the Unknown (1956) – Soldier Burned on Back
- The Hideout (1956) – 'Teacher'
- Quatermass 2 (1957) – Peterson
- Account Rendered (1957) – Porter
- The Big Chance (1957) – Café Owner
- Black Ice (1957) – White
- The Camp on Blood Island (1958) – Sergeant-Major
- Up the Creek (1958) – Bennett
- The Adventures of Hal 5 (1958) – Cooper
- Further Up the Creek (1958) – Bennett
- Model for Murder (1959) – Costard, Chauffeur
- Make Mine a Million (1959) – Plainclothes Policeman (uncredited)
- No Trees in the Street (1959) – Jackie
- Innocent Meeting (1959) – Bill
- Ben-Hur (1959) – Supplier to Leper Colony (uncredited)
- Tommy the Toreador (1959) – Tommy's dresser
- Inn for Trouble (1960) – Mr. Turner
- Sink the Bismarck! (1960) – Bridge Officer (uncredited)
- Life Is a Circus (1960) – Driver
- The Boy Who Stole a Million (1960) – Commissionaire
- Sword of Sherwood Forest (1960) – The Sheriff's Lieutenant
- Locker Sixty-Nine (Edgar Wallace Mysteries) (1962) – Peters
- Village of Daughters (1962) – Balbino (A Father)
- Just for Fun (1963) – Man With Badge
- The Break (1963) – Moses
- The Comedy Man (1964) – Commercial Director
- The Secret of Blood Island (1964) – O'Reilly
- The Face of Fu Manchu (1965) – Chief Magistrate
- Gideon's Way (1965) - The Great Plane Robbery - Dobson
- Quatermass and the Pit (1967) – Minister
- UFO (1970) – Admiral Sheringham, "Destruction"
- Harriet's Back in Town (1972–73)
