= Philip Latham =

English actor (1929–2020)

- Born: Charles Philip Latham; 17 January 1929; Essex, England
- Died: 20 June 2020 (aged 91)
- Occupation: Actor
- Years active: 1955–1990

Charles Philip Latham (17 January 1929 – 20 June 2020) was an English actor. He was best known for playing Willy Izard in The Troubleshooters (1965–1972) and Plantagenet Palliser in The Pallisers (1974).

== Early life ==
Latham was born 17 January 1929 in Leigh-on-Sea, Essex. He had an identical twin, John, older brother, Barry, and younger brother, David.

Latham was educated at Felsted School. After he graduated from Felsted, he completed his national service in the Royal Artillery and then graduated from the Royal Academy of Dramatic Art in 1951.

== Career ==
In the late 1960s/early 1970s Latham was well known to British television viewers for his portrayal of chief accountant Willy Izard, the "conscience" to hard-nosed oil company industrialist Brian Stead (played by Geoffrey Keen) in the BBC series The Troubleshooters (1965–72). Other credits Jesus of Nazareth (1956), Paul of Tarsus, Danger Man (1960–1962), Maigret, The Treasure Seekers, The Avengers, Love Story, Undermind, UFO, The Saint, Sergeant Cork, Justice, The Cedar Tree, Killers, Hammer House of Horror, The Professionals, No. 10, and Nanny.

One of Latham's horror film roles was as Dracula's sinister servant Klove in Hammer's 1966 film Dracula, Prince of Darkness, and he had previously worked for Hammer in The Devil-Ship Pirates and The Secret of Blood Island (both 1964). His other film roles included appearances in Ring of Spies (1964), Spy Story (1976) and Force 10 from Navarone (1978). On television he played the joint-lead role of Plantagenet Palliser (opposite Susan Hampshire) in the 26-part BBC series The Pallisers. He also played Lord President Borusa in the 20th anniversary episode of Doctor Who, "The Five Doctors" (1983).

== Filmography ==
Year	Title	Role	Notes
1955	The Dam Busters	Flight Sergeant	Uncredited
1959	Left Right and Centre	Reporter	Uncredited
1959	Emergency Ward 10	RSO Barnett	10 episodes
1959	The Moonstone	Dr. Ezra Jennings	Episode: Episode 1.6
1959	The Army Game	Major Price	Episode: The Bisley Court Martial
1959	The Flying Doctor	Lou Vernon	Episode: Death in the Clouds
1959	Dial 999	Dave Saunders	Episode: Robbery with Violence
1960	The Adventures of Robin Hood	Father Ignatius	Episode: A Bushel of Apples
1960	Danger Man	Frank Delroy	Episode: View from the Villa
1960	Paul of Tarsus	Luke, the story-teller	10 episodes
1960	The Four Just Men	Valio	Episode: The Man with the Golden Touch
1962	Masters of Venus	Doctor Wilson	
1962	The Andromeda Breakthrough	Osborne's P.A.	2 Episodes
1962	Locker Sixty-Nine	Dr. Trent	Edgar Wallace Mysteries
1962	The Wild and the Willing	Don	Uncredited
1962	Maigret	James	Episode: The Wedding Guest
1962	Harpers West One	Oliver Backhouse	14 episodes
1963-1966	The Avengers	Professor Cartright/Carter	2 episodes
1963	Suspense	George Boulter	Episode: Deferred Terms
1963	Richard the Lionheart	Brian McFergus	Episode: The Raiders
1963	Moonstrike	Major Kurt Koenig	Episode: The Canary
1963	The Scales of Justice	Official Receiver	Episode: The Invisible Asset
1963	The Rivals	Lawrence	
1963-1964	The Saint	Arthur Ellshaw/Long Harry Garrett	2 episodes
1964	Ring of Spies	Captain Ray	
1964	The Devil-Ship Pirates	Miller	
1964	The Human Jungle	Cooper	Episode: Success Machine
1964	The Plane Makers	Eric Styles	Episode: A Lesson for Corbett
1964	Thursday Theatre	Philip Mortimer	Episode: Murder Mistaken
1965	R3	Colonel Gold	Episode: The Critical Moment
1965	Z Cars	Martin	Episode: Brotherly Love
1965	Public Eye	Alec Maxwell	Episode: They Go Off in the End, Like Fruit
1965	Dr. Finlay's Casebook	Robert Lennox	Episode: Soon or Late
1965	The Secret of Blood Island	Captain Drake	
1965	Story Parade	John Coppard	Episode: The Campaign
1965	Front Page Story	Gerald McPherson	Episode: Stateless
1965	Undermind	Edmonds	Episode: Puppets of Evil
1965	No Hiding Place	Michael Thompson	Episode: Danger: Wrong Turning
1965-72	The Troubleshooters	Willy Izzard	110 episodes
1966	Dracula: Prince of Darkness	Klove	
1968	Middlemarch	The Rev. Mr Casaubon	5 episodes
1970	The Last Grenade	Adams	Uncredited
1974	The Pallisers	Plantagenet	26 episodes
1976	Spy Story	Ferdy Foxwell	
1976-78	The Cedar Tree	Arthur Bourne	75 episodes
1978	Force 10 from Navarone	Commander Jensen	
1981	From a Far Country	Chaplain	
1983	Number 10	Charles Arbuthnot	Miniseries
1983	Doctor Who	Borusa	Episode: "The Five Doctors"
1984	Jackanory Playhouse	King	Episode: Rolf the Stonemason
