= Suzan Farmer =

British actress (1942–2017)

- AIP publicity still, 1965
- Born: Suzan Maxine Farmer; 16 June 1942; Maidstone, Kent, England
- Died: 17 September 2017 (aged 75); London, England
- Resting place: Mortlake Cemetery
- Occupation: Actress
- Spouse: Ian McShane (m. 1965; div. 1968)
- Relatives: The Baron Farmer (brother); George Farmer (nephew)

Suzan Maxine Farmer (16 June 1942 – 17 September 2017) was an English film and television actress. She was regularly cast in movies produced by Hammer Films.

== Early life ==
The daughter of David Farmer, a trader in metals, and Eleanor (née Best), she was born in Maidstone, Kent, although the family later moved to Bray in Berkshire, near the location of Bray Studios, later used by Hammer. Her younger brother is the Baron Farmer, the city financier and a Conservative life peer. Their parents were alcoholics, as her brother related in his maiden speech in the House of Lords in 2014, saying the two children "experienced the poverty, neglect and shame that are such potent drivers of social exclusion". David Farmer's company was liquidated and he died before his elder child was seven. Suzan Farmer trained at the Central School of Speech and Drama.

== Career ==
Suzan Farmer had lead roles in several Hammer swashbuckling and horror films of the 1960s. The first of these was The Scarlet Blade (US: The Crimson Blade, 1963), an English Civil War tale with Lionel Jeffries and Oliver Reed, while The Devil-Ship Pirates (1964), concerned a ship allied with the Spanish Armada and was the first of her three films with Christopher Lee in the lead. Dracula, Prince of Darkness (1966) and Rasputin, the Mad Monk (1966) were made back-to back using the same sets and an overlapping cast. In the Dracula film, she was targeted by Lee's vampire, but fought him off sending him to a cold, watery end assisted by Francis Matthews, who played her husband, and also her brother in Rasputin.

Another of her horror film roles, this time for a company other than Hammer, was as support in Die, Monster, Die! (aka, Monster of Terror, 1965), starring Boris Karloff as her character's father, but she found Karloff himself rather distant. The thriller Persecution (1974), with Ralph Bates as her husband, was a failure both critically and at the box-office. Other films include the war drama 633 Squadron (1964) as an RAF driver, plus the comedy Doctor in Clover (1966).

A regular performer in British television series, Farmer appeared in an episode of the Patrick McGoohan series Danger Man ("No Marks for Servility", 1964) and also featured in other ITC series in the 1960s and 70s, including UFO ("Survival", 1971), Man in a Suitcase, The Persuaders!, and in four episodes of The Saint playing four different characters. She appeared in a BBC television adaptation of Dostoyevsky's The Idiot (1966) and played Sally Carstairs in their version of Edmund Crispin's detective novel The Moving Toyshop (1964).

Other television appearances were in the 1968 series The Caesars (1968), an episode of the BBC science fiction anthology series Out of the Unknown (1969), an episode of the ATV series Thriller ("Death in Deep Water", 1975) and in the BBC's science fiction series Blake's 7 ("Deliverance", 1978). For a month in 1978, Farmer was a cast member of Coronation Street playing a divorced chiropodist who treated Albert Tatlock, and briefly went out with Ken Barlow.

On stage, she was a founding member of John Fraser's London Shakespeare Group, playing Olivia in a production of Twelfth Night which opened in Beijing, China and had a residency at the Donmar Warehouse in 1982. The group toured West Africa performing extracts from the plays for 60,000 children.

== Personal life and death ==
Farmer was married to the actor Ian McShane from 1965 to 1968. Her acting career had ended by the mid-1980s, and she later became reclusive and suffered from depression and alcoholism.

Farmer died of cancer on 17 September 2017, aged 75.

== Selected filmography ==
- The Supreme Secret (1958) – Tess
- The Dawn Killer (1959) – Cathy Hawkes
- The Wild and the Willing (1962) – Susan (uncredited)
- Wings of Mystery (1963) – Worker at English Steel Corporation Ltd. (uncredited)
- 80,000 Suspects (1963) – Carole (uncredited)
- The Scarlet Blade (1963) – Constance Beverley
- The Devil-Ship Pirates (1964) – Angela Smeeton
- 633 Squadron (1964) – WAAF Sgt. Mary Blake / Bissell
- Danger Man (1964) Episode No Marks for Servility - Helen
- Die, Monster, Die! (1965) – Susan Witley
- Sherlock Holmes (1965) – Episode "The Beryl Coronet" - Mary
- Dracula, Prince of Darkness (1966) – Diana Kent
- Doctor in Clover (1966) – Nurse Holliday
- Rasputin, the Mad Monk (1966) – Vanessa
- Where the Bullets Fly (1966) – Caron
- The Saint (1966) - Episode (S5, E6) "The Convenient Monster" as Ann Clanraith
- Man in a Suitcase (1967) - Episode "Brainwash" - Judy
- UFO (1970) - Episode "Survival" - Tina Duval
- The Persuaders! (1971) - Episode "That's Me Over There" - Ann Summers
- Persecution (1974) – Janie Masters
- Dixon of Dock Green (1976) - Episode "Vagrant" - Margaret Spurling
- Coronation Street (1978) – 9 Episodes - Sally Robson
- Blake's 7 (1978) – Episode "Deliverance" - Meegat
