= George Farmer (businessman) =

British and American entrepreneur and businessman (born 1990)

The Honourable George Farmer
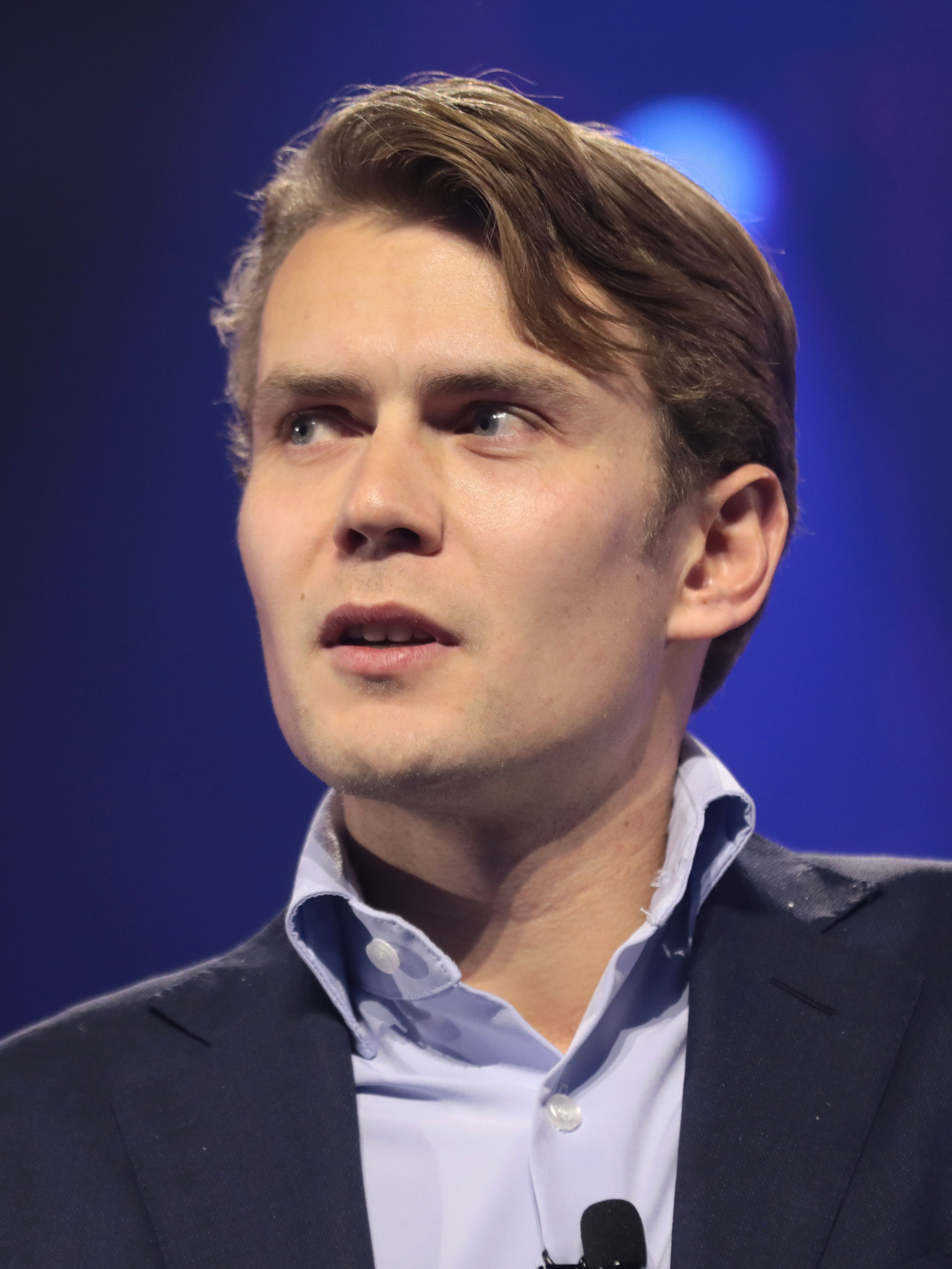
- Farmer in 2022
- Born: George Thomas Stahel Farmer; 5 July 1990 (age 36); London, England
- Citizenship: United Kingdom; United States (2025–present)
- Education: St Peter's College, Oxford (BTh)
- Years active: 2018–present
- Spouse: Candace Owens (m. 2019)
- Children: 5
- Father: Michael Farmer
- Relatives: Suzan Farmer (aunt)

George Thomas Stahel Farmer (born 5 July 1990) is a British and American entrepreneur and businessman. He is the former chairman of Turning Point UK and the former CEO of Parler and Parlement Technologies. He is the son of Michael Farmer, Baron Farmer, as well as the husband of American political commentator Candace Owens.

== Early life and education ==
Farmer was born on 5 July 1990 in London, United Kingdom, to Michael Farmer and Jennifer Potts. His father became a life peer when he was appointed to the British House of Lords in 2014. As his son, this gives Farmer the title of The Honourable.

Farmer attended St Paul's School, London. He then attended St Peter's College, Oxford, where he earned a degree in theology. While there, he was a member of the Bullingdon Club.

== Career ==
=== Turning Point UK ===
In February 2019, Farmer became chairman of Turning Point UK, the British offshoot of Turning Point USA, a right-wing advocacy group for educational institutions. His then-fiancée and now wife, Candace Owens, was communications director for Turning Point USA at this time. He continued to be chairman until April.

=== Parler ===
Farmer took over as CEO of Parler, an American social networking service, and its parent company Parlement Technologies, in May 2021. Prior to his tenure as CEO, Parler was allegedly used as a means for organising the January 6 United States Capitol attack, building a perception that it had a lack of moderation for violent speech. This led it to be removed from major app stores. Also during Farmer's tenure, Kanye West tried to take over the social networking service. Farmer said of the proposed acquisition:

Ye's (Note: Kanye West legally changed his name to Ye in 2021.) acquiring of Parler will strengthen our ability to create an uncancelable ecosystem [...] Parler will remain a place where everyone can think, listen, and speak freely. We will continue the fight against censorship, cancel culture, and authoritarianism.

The deal later fell apart.

In April 2023, it was announced that Farmer would step down from his role as CEO.

=== Other work ===
At the 2019 European Parliament election he stood for the Brexit Party in the South East England constituency. He was not elected.

Farmer was a research analyst at the London-based market research firm Jigsaw Research. He also founded the Red Kite Group. As of 2023, Farmer is a board member of GB News. In 2024, he attempted to buy the Catholic Herald.

== Personal life ==
Farmer proposed marriage to Candace Owens via a FaceTime call on 29 December 2018, 17 days after meeting each other for the first time in London. They married in 2019 at Trump Winery. They have five children and reside in Nashville, Tennessee. Farmer is a Catholic.

== Views ==
=== Freedom of speech ===
Farmer was CEO of Parler, a social media site that billed itself as a "neutral town square", and a free-speech alternative to other social media apps. In an interview with The New York Times, Farmer said:

I mean, for example, defamatory content, sexualization of minors, nudity and pornography, indecency involving violence, fraud, IP theft, doxxing, incitement to violence, all of that stuff is removed because that’s against our guidelines. Most of it's illegal. You can't shout fire in a crowded room. Now, when it comes to other speech, do I think, personally — now, this is kind of the nexus for the whole debate. Do I think personally it should be taken down? Well, the reality is, is that, at any point that I am making a judgment as to what should and shouldn't be allowed in terms of speech, you've hit the nail on the head. That's where the whole free speech element rests, and kind of rises and falls, if you like. I don't think that I have the power. I don't think that any human being has the power to decide what another human being should think. I think that it's up to other people to decide what they want to think. And I think the only way you defeat a bad idea is by showing it a good idea. Obviously, in societies where they do try and censor speech, the opposite viewpoint is normally exactly what then takes root and grows like wildfire. Because, of course, as soon as you try to shut down something, people are naturally drawn to it. It's a bit like — not to get too theological, but The Da Vinci Code was on the Catholic Church's list of banned books. Well, of course, that did nothing more for it than sell millions of books because suddenly everyone wants to read about it. As soon as you start to shut down conversations, people get interested.

=== Catholic Church ===
Farmer is a Catholic and earned a degree in theology from Oxford University. Though raised as an Evangelical Christian, as he learned about religion, Protestantism became less appealing while Catholicism "became increasingly apparent" to him. He agreed with Pope Benedict XVI's vision of a smaller and more dogmatic church, closer to the Church of the Apostolic Era.
