= Michael Farmer, Baron Farmer =

British businessman (born 1944)

The Right Honourable The Lord Farmer
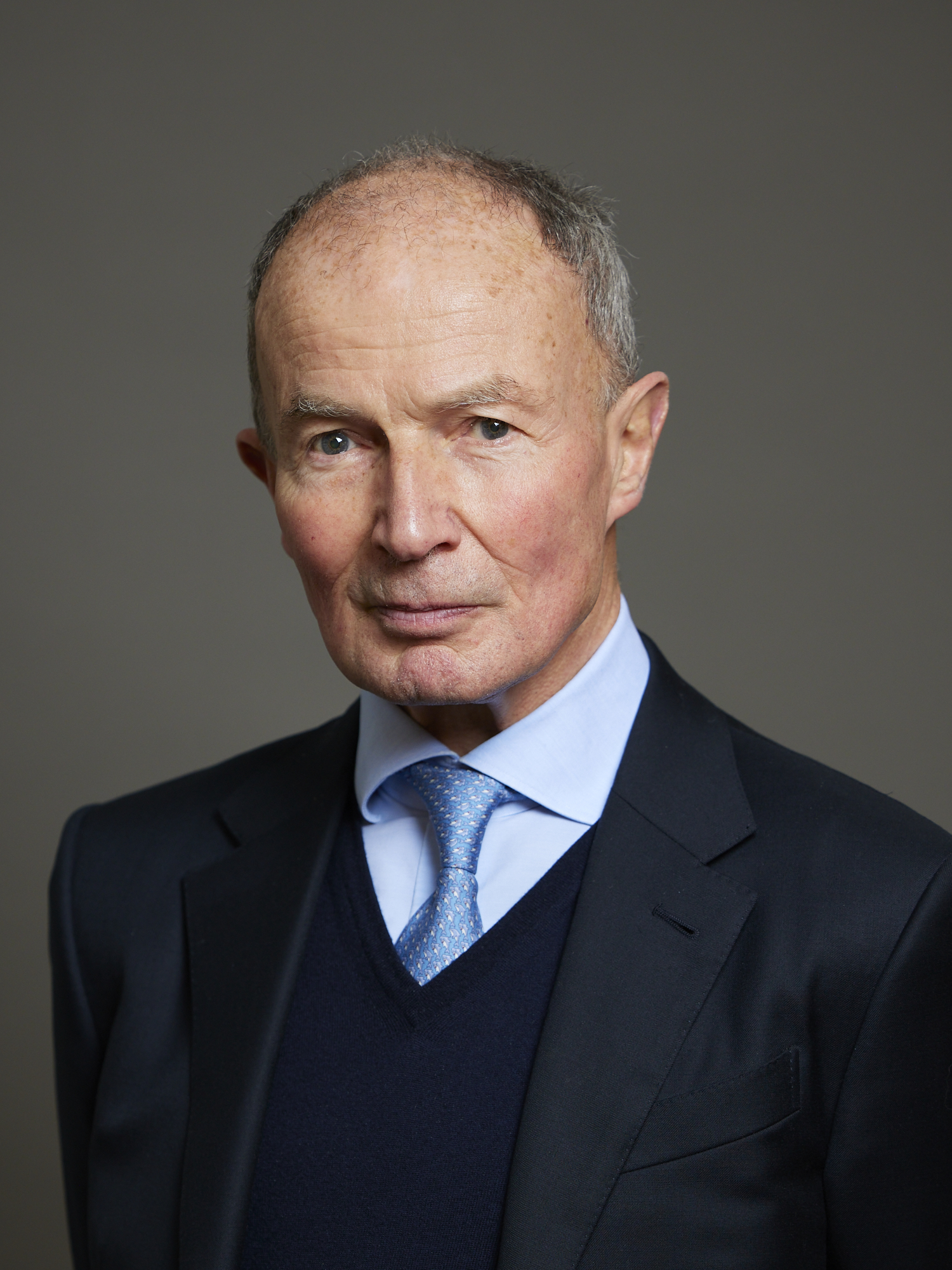
- Official portrait, 2024

Member of the House of Lords
- Lord Temporal
- Life peerage 5 September 2014

Personal details
- Born: Michael Stahel Farmer; 17 December 1944 (age 81) Tonbridge, Kent, England
- Party: Conservative
- Spouse: Jennifer Potts (m. 1975)
- Children: 3, including George
- Relatives: Suzan Farmer (sister); Candace Owens (daughter-in-law)
- Occupation: Businessman, politician
- Website: www.lordmichaelfarmer.co.uk

Michael Stahel Farmer, Baron Farmer (born 17 December 1944), nicknamed "Mr Copper", is a British businessman, former treasurer of the Conservative Party and life peer in the House of Lords. He is the father-in-law of American political commentator Candace Owens.

== Early and personal life ==
Farmer was born in Tonbridge, Kent, England. He is the brother of the actress Suzan Farmer, who died of cancer in 2017. Farmer has described how he and his sister had a violent and chaotic early childhood characterised by "poverty, neglect and shame". His father, David S. Farmer, a metals trader, was wounded in World War II and died at the age of 40 due to alcoholism when Farmer was aged four. He and his sister narrowly avoided removal from their mother's care due to her own struggle with alcohol. Farmer was educated at Wantage Grammar School, as a boarder. His mother died when he was 25 years old.

In 1975, in the City of London, Farmer married Jennifer Potts. They have three children. His son George Farmer, who ran unsuccessfully for the Brexit Party at the 2019 European Parliament election and was CEO of the conservative social networking app Parler, married the American political commentator Candace Owens in 2019.

Farmer is a born-again Christian, having become religious when he was 35 years old, and preaches at the 800-year-old St Helen's Church, Bishopsgate, in the City of London around the corner from the London Metal Exchange. He became the Christian deputy chair and trustee of the Council of Christians and Jews in 2016. He sponsors the Ark All Saints Academy in Camberwell in South London which was created with the goal of improving education for disadvantaged children.

== Business career ==
Farmer started working at 18. He began as a difference account clerk and messenger at AJ Strauss, a London Metal Exchange member firm at which his father had worked, earning eight pounds a week. He spent most of his career in the City of London, involved in the trading of base metals, especially copper. He was a protégé of metal trader Manfred Kopelman.

In 1974, at 30 years of age, he was named a managing director of Cerro Metals Ltd in London, a position he held until 1983. In 1983 he joined Anglo Chemical, which was part of Philipp Brothers/Salomon Brothers (now Phibro), the commodities trading unit of Citigroup Inc., as head of its global base metal trading until 1989. He left in 1989 to form the Metal & Commodity Company Ltd trading company, a subsidiary of German metal trader Metallgesellschaft AG, which became the world’s largest trader in physical copper and nickel, and was its CEO from 1989 to 2000. In 1999 the company went public as it was floated on the London Stock Exchange under the title MG Plc with Farmer as its co-CEO; it was the first metals trader to be listed on the exchange. In 2000 he sold it to the trading company Enron for $448 million. Enron renamed it Enron Metals (in 2002, Enron sold the firm, which is now called Sempra Metals and is based in London). Farmer then took two years off to study the Bible.

In 2005 he was a founding partner of the Red Kite Group of hedge funds, which provides mine finance and futures investment opportunities for funds. In 2013, the firm returned over 50 percent on its metals fund. In 2022 his net worth was estimated at £150 million.

== Political career ==
Farmer was the co-treasurer of the Conservative Party from 2011 to 2015. From 2012 to 2022, he gave at least £6m to the Conservatives. He is a former Chairman of the Conservative Foundation.

On 5 September 2014, Farmer was created a life peer as Baron Farmer, of Bishopsgate in the City of London and in the House of Lords joined the Conservative benches. His maiden speech was about women's homelessness, domestic violence, and social exclusion. He cycles from his office to the House of Lords.

The frequency of Farmer's speaking appearances, voting record, and tabling of written questions is above average in the House of Lords.

=== Family and prisoner issues ===
Farmer supported the former leader, David Cameron, when he accepted the think tank Centre for Social Justice's Breakthrough Britain report emphasising the wider social repercussions of family breakdown.

As a parliamentarian Farmer has spoken about family hubs and other measures to ensure families who need it receive early help; boosting statutory help for children leaving local authority care; improving children and young people's mental health and wellbeing, including by reducing family breakdown and regulating access to pornography; enabling upwards social mobility and better life chances; and addressing the persecution of Christians in North Korea, the Middle East and the United Kingdom.

Farmer and Samantha Callan founded the Family Hubs Network in 2019 to support the spread of Family Hubs across the whole of the United Kingdom.

Farmer introduced a Private Member's Bill which would make family impact assessments statutory for all changes to government policy and spending and that would ensure the government keeps track of family stability rates (the number of children who grow up with both their parents).

He was a member of the Select Committee on Social Mobility, and the Joint Committee on the Draft Domestic Abuse Bill.

Farmer is a vocal supporter of welfare and prison reform. He was commissioned by the United Kingdom Ministry of Justice (MoJ) to carry out a review and make a report of how supporting men in prison to have better family and other relationships can reduce reoffending rates. Following the acceptance of his recommendations, The Farmer Review (2017), the MoJ commissioned a further review and report from Lord Farmer on the importance of relationships for female offenders' rehabilitation, The Farmer Review for Women (2019), which is also being implemented. He continues to work with the MOJ to implement the recommendations of the reviews.

=== Brexit ===
Farmer was an active and vocal supporter of Brexit. In 2017 he donated £300,000 to the Vote Leave campaign, which supported a "Leave" vote at the 2016 United Kingdom European Union membership referendum.

=== Antisemitism and Israel ===
In August 2024, Farmer wrote a lengthy thread on X on the subject of antisemitism and the Gaza war in response to comments by his daughter-in-law, Candace Owens, saying: "In view of public comments from a high-profile member of my family, I want to put my own views on antisemitism and Israel's current military campaign in Gaza on public record." Within two days, his post had attracted over one million views.

Farmer has written about antisemitism:

As a teenager, growing up in the wake of WW2, I became very aware of the cruelty meted out, before and during that conflict, against Jewish people – because they were Jewish. I found it impossible to comprehend how humans could, intentionally, be as cruel as possible to others. Then, as a young man, I worked with many Jewish people in the city: the boss in one of my first jobs had come to Britain on a Kindertransport. I often experienced kindness and thoughtfulness from Jewish friends as well, at a time when I had few close relationships.... To conclude, I should point out that I am the Christian Deputy Chair of the Council for Christians and Jews. This was founded in 1942 as a bulwark against antisemitism, and our monarch has always been its patron.

Continuing on, addressing the Gaza war, he wrote:

A recent letter from international military leaders said that the Israel Defence Forces were acting in a highly accountable way in an extremely complex and difficult environment. We cannot forget that they have been forced to prosecute this war... Israel [is a] rare example of a democracy in the Middle East, a liberal state governed by the rule of law. Of course, it has the right to defend its citizens when murderously attacked on its soil in one of the cruellest and most callous pogroms in history. We cannot forget the large number of innocent hostages that were taken, many have died, and some are still missing. Israel faces an existential threat as Hamas, the terrorist organisation, has stated their intention to destroy it.

He noted as well that: "the plight of civilians in Gaza is also utterly appalling, but I see Israel has little option but to fight its enemy where it chooses to hide itself – in tunnels under key infrastructure and behind innocent civilians. We cannot forget that they have been forced to prosecute this war."

Orders of precedence in the United Kingdom
| Preceded by The Lord Richards of Herstmonceux | Gentlemen; The Lord Farmer | Followed by The Lord Fox |
