= Water Oakley =

Coordinates: 51.492°N 0.674°W

- Hamlet
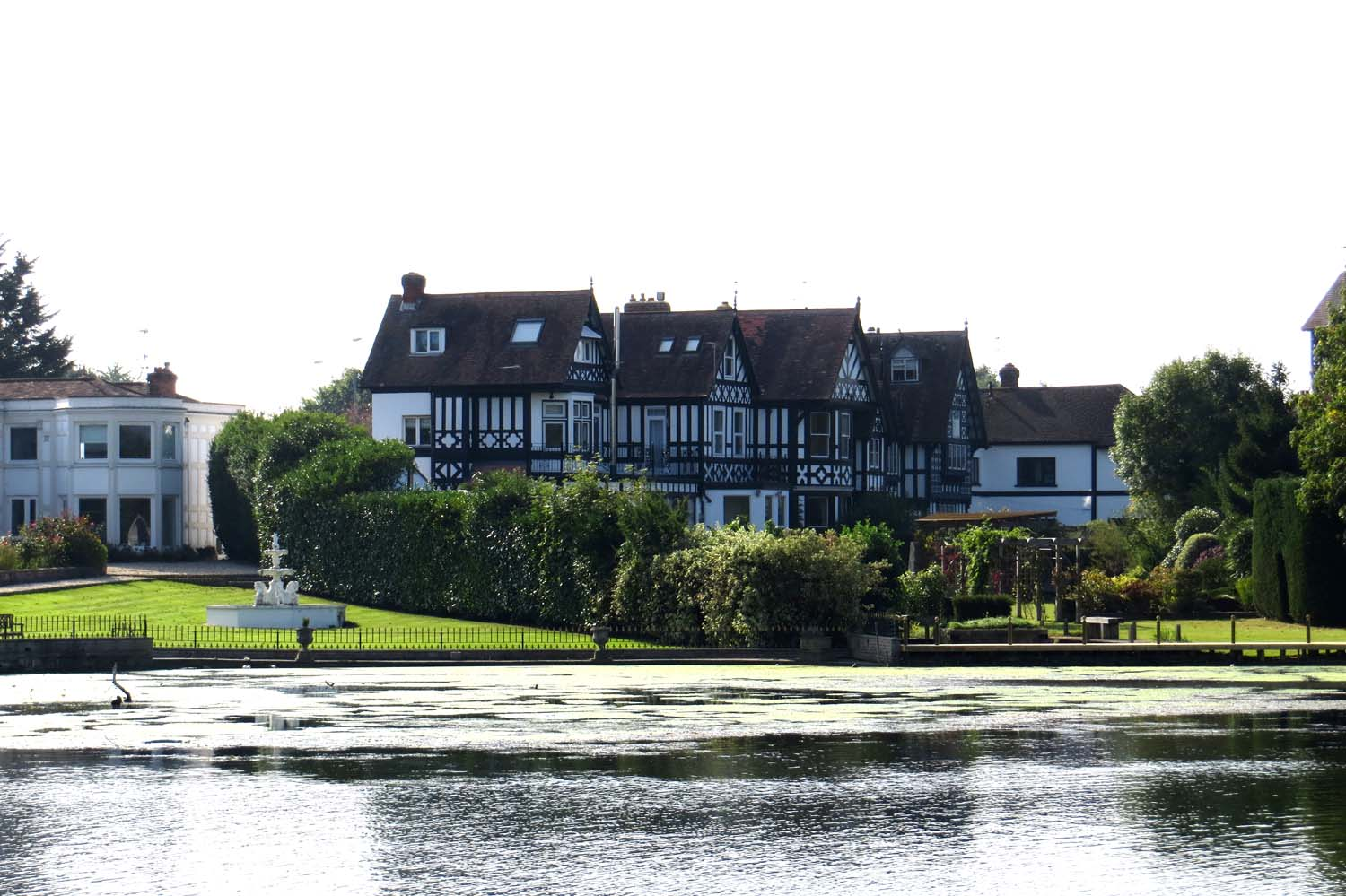
- Houses overlooking the Thames at Water Oakley

- Location within Berkshire
- OS grid reference: SU919776
- Civil parish: Bray
- Unitary authority: Windsor and Maidenhead
- Shire county: Berkshire
- Ceremonial county: Berkshire
- Region: South East
- Country: England
- Sovereign state: United Kingdom
- Post town: WINDSOR
- Postcode district: SL4
- Police: Thames Valley
- Fire: Royal Berkshire
- Ambulance: South Central

Water Oakley is a hamlet on the River Thames in the civil parish of Bray, in the Windsor and Maidenhead district, in the ceremonial county of Berkshire, England. It is the location of both Bray Film Studios and the Oakley Court Hotel.

== History ==
It first appeared on maps around 1800. However, the name 'Oakley' is derived from the Old English ac-leah which translates as 'a clearing in an oak wood'. Local folklore suggests a Saxon church there was demolished around 1293 to build St Michael's Church in Bray.

== Geography ==
Water Oakley has a site of Special Scientific Interest (SSSI) just to the north of the village, called Bray Pennyroyal Field.

== Notable people ==
- Manpreet Bambra, actress
