= The Steel Bayonet =

1957 film by Michael Carreras

- Directed by: Michael Carreras
- Written by: Howard Clewes
- Produced by: Michael Carreras; Anthony Nelson Keys
- Starring: Leo Genn; Kieron Moore; Michael Medwin; Michael Ripper
- Cinematography: Jack Asher
- Edited by: Bill Lenny
- Music by: Leonard Salzedo
- Production company: United Artists
- Distributed by: Hammer Film Productions
- Release dates: 3 June 1957; (UK); 1958 (US)
- Running time: 85 minutes
- Country: United Kingdom
- Language: English

The Steel Bayonet is a 1957 British war film directed by Michael Carreras and starring Leo Genn, Kieron Moore and Michael Medwin. Michael Caine also had a small role in the film, early in his career. It is set during the Second World War, in the Tunisian desert when a small British observation force are surrounded in a farm by overwhelming forces of the German Afrika Korps. Filming took place on Salisbury Plain, which doubled for North Africa. This was Michael Carreras' first film he directed for Hammer. Phil Leakey did Makeup and Sid Pearson did Special Effects. The film's original working title was Observation Post. The German soldiers actually spoke German (with English subtitles) in the film, which was unusual for its time. Filming wrapped on Sept. 20, 1956, it was trade shown in London on May 14, 1957, and released on June 3, 1957. It was released in the US in 1958 on a double bill with a Forrest Tucker western called Fort Massacre.

== Plot ==
In Tunisia in 1943, as the North African Campaign draws to a close, and the German and Italian forces are being pushed back on Tunis, a company of British infantry are tasked with holding a small Arab farm against an expected last-ditch counter-attack; the farm's water tower will be used as an observation point by a few Royal Artillery spotters. To defend the farm British Lieutenant Colonel Derry picks a company led by Major Alan Gerrard; these men have been in the thick of the fighting around Tunis and are greatly reduced in number (described by the narrator as down to barely two platoons). So Gerrard's company set out on foot for the farm; on the way they are joined by Royal Artillery Captain Dickie Mead and his signaller, Ames. Arriving at the farm, Gerrard's men expel the occupants and dig slit trenches in front of the farm. With the water tower and its ladder in clear view, Mead decides to wait until just before dawn to climb it. The following day Mead uses his position to target artillery fired on to the German forces. All goes well until the Germans send out a reconnaissance patrol to pinpoint the observation post, but Gerrard's men successfully repulse the attack.

With the Germans now sure of the British position, it becomes a test of nerve for seasoned troops and new boys alike. All of them stick it out until they are finally ordered to retreat with their mission deemed successful. Mead decides to stay behind and cover their escape with artillery fire, leading to the death of Sergeant-Major Gill and Private Middleditch. When Mead finally succumbs to German fire, only the injured Gerrard is left. With the Germans in the farm and his surviving men well on their way to safety, the now mortally wounded major radios for the artillery to totally destroy the farm, killing both Gerrard and the Germans' last chance of advancing further on this front.

== Cast ==
- Leo Genn as Major Alan Gerrard
- Kieron Moore as Captain Dickie Mead, Royal Artillery
- Michael Medwin as Lieutenant Vernon
- Robert Brown as Company Sergeant Major Gill
- Michael Ripper as Private Middleditch
- John Paul as Lieutenant Colonel Derry
- Shay Gorman as Sergeant Gates
- Tom Bowman as Sergeant Nicholls
- Jack Stewart as Private Wentworth
- Ian Whittaker as Private Wilson
- Bernard Horsfall as Private Livingstone
- John Watson as Corporal Bean
- Arthur Lovegrove as Private Jarvis
- Percy Herbert as Private Clark
- Paddy Joyce as Corporal Ames, Capt. Meads signaller
- Michael Balfour as Private Thomas
- Raymond Francis as General
- Garard Green as German Company Commander
- Michael Caine (cameo, uncredited)
