= The Secret of Blood Island =

1965 British film by Quentin Lawrence

- UK theatrical release poster
- Directed by: Quentin Lawrence
- Written by: John Gilling
- Produced by: Anthony Nelson Keys
- Starring: Jack Hedley; Barbara Shelley; Patrick Wymark; Charles Tingwell
- Cinematography: Jack Asher
- Edited by: Tom Simpson
- Music by: James Bernard
- Production company: Hammer Film Productions
- Distributed by: J. Arthur Rank Film Distributors(UK); Universal Release (US)
- Release dates: 14 June 1965 (UK); 14 June 1965 (US)
- Running time: 84 minutes
- Country: United Kingdom
- Language: English

The Secret of Blood Island is a 1965 British war film directed by Quentin Lawrence and starring Jack Hedley, Barbara Shelley and Patrick Wymark. It was written by John Gilling.

The film is a prequel to the 1958 film The Camp on Blood Island.

== Premise ==
British Prisoners of War help a wounded female agent, Elaine, to escape the Japanese during the Second World War.

== Main cast ==
- Jack Hedley as Sergeant John Crewe
- Barbara Shelley as Elaine
- Patrick Wymark as Major Jocomo
- Charles Tingwell as Major Dryden
- Bill Owen as George Bludgin
- Peter Welch as Richardson
- Michael Ripper as Lieutenant Tojoko
- Lee Montague as Levy
- Edwin Richfield as Tom O'Reilly
- Glyn Houston as Berry
- David Saire as Kempi Chief
- Philip Latham as Captain Drake
- Ian Whittaker as Mills
- John Southworth as Leonard
- Peter Craze as Red
- Henry Davies as Taffy

== Production ==
The film was shot in Eastmancolor and released in that format in Britain, but the U.S. prints were in black & white.

Michael Ripper later said, "thought the story was very dodgy. I don't give a damn how hungry you are, if you haven't seen a bird in four years, or whatever it was, she'd have been stampeded, wouldn’t she? Somebody must have had the strength. I don't believe the story at all, but I must admit I had a good part in it."

== Reception ==
The Monthly Film Bulletin wrote: "Grotesquely inefficient melodrama, burdened with a ludicrous script, unconvincing settings, and Goonish impersonations of wicked Japanese from Patrick Wymark and Michael Ripper. Only Jack Hedley and Lee Montague come out of this sorry affair with any sort of credit."

The Guardian called it "nasty".

TV Guide called the film "fairly silly".

The Radio Times called it "lurid but fairly enjoyable."
