= The Scarlet Blade =

1963 British film by John Gilling

- Poster with the US title
- Directed by: John Gilling
- Screenplay by: John Gilling
- Produced by: Anthony Nelson Keys
- Starring: Lionel Jeffries; Oliver Reed; Jack Hedley; June Thorburn
- Cinematography: Jack Asher
- Edited by: John Dunsford
- Music by: Gary Hughes
- Production companies: Associated British Picture Corporation; Hammer Films
- Distributed by: Columbia Pictures
- Release date: 12 August 1963 (UK)
- Running time: 82 minutes
- Country: United Kingdom
- Language: English

The Scarlet Blade (released in the United States as The Crimson Blade) is a 1963 British adventure film written and directed by John Gilling and starring Lionel Jeffries, Oliver Reed, Jack Hedley and June Thorburn.

It is a period drama set during the English Civil War, a genre not usually approached by Hammer films of that time.

== Plot ==
When King Charles I is captured by Roundhead forces led by the tyrant Colonel Judd and his right-hand man Captain Sylvester, it is up to a band of locals loyal to the King led by a Robin Hood–type character named the Scarlet Blade to try to rescue him. They are helped by Judd's daughter Claire who secretly helps them in defiance of her father.

== Cast ==
- Lionel Jeffries as Colonel Judd
- Oliver Reed as Captain Tom Sylvester
- Jack Hedley as Edward Beverley, the Scarlet Blade
- June Thorburn as Claire Judd
- Michael Ripper as Pablo
- Harold Goldblatt as Jacob
- Duncan Lamont as Major Bell
- Clifford Elkin as Philip Beverley
- Suzan Farmer as Constance Beverley
- John Harvey as Sgt. Grey
- Charles Houston as Drury
- Robert Rietti as King Charles I
- George Woodbridge as Towncryer

== Reception ==
The film is said to have "at most only a casual acquaintance with recorded history".

The Radio Times noted that Oliver Reed was "on form as a renegade swordsman with an eye for the ladies" but gave the overall film two stars out of five.

A very mixed review focusing on the cast, stated, "The main problem is Hadley, who is as far as possible from the Errol Flynn type you would expect to find. Over his career, he was much more of a world-weary supporting actor type – Hadley may be best known as the burned-out detective at the center of Lucio Fulci’s notorious giallo film, The New York Ripper. (...) Considerably more interesting are the bad guys. Let’s start with Col. Judd, and Jeffries is a revelation as a ruthless bad guy. It comes as quite a shock considering the actor is best known for playing the lovable grandfather in Chitty Chitty Bang Bang (even though he was younger than his supposed son, Dick Van Dyke!)."

== Accolades ==
The film was nominated for the BAFTA for Best cinematography.
