= Lee Montague =

British actor (1927–2025)

- Born: Leonard Goldberg; 16 October 1927; Bow, London, England
- Died: 30 March 2025 (aged 97)
- Education: Old Vic Theatre School
- Occupation: Actor
- Years active: 1951–2017
- Spouse: Ruth Goring (m. 1955; died 2023)
- Children: 2

Leonard Goldberg (16 October 1927 – 30 March 2025), known professionally as Lee Montague, was an English actor noted for his roles in film and television, usually playing tough guys.

== Early life ==
Montague was born in Bow, London. His family was Jewish: his father was a tailor from Russia, and his mother was from Lithuania.

== Career ==
Montague was a student of the Old Vic Theatre School.

Montague's film credits include The Camp on Blood Island, Billy Budd, The Secret of Blood Island, Deadlier Than the Male, Brother Sun, Sister Moon, Jesus of Nazareth, Mahler and The Legacy. His theatre credits include: Who Saw Him Die by Tudor Gates staged in 1974 at London's Theatre Royal Haymarket in which he played the part of John Rawlings, the nemesis of former police Superintendent Pratt played by Stratford Johns. On Broadway, he portrayed Gregory Hawke in The Climate of Eden (1952), and Ed in Entertaining Mr. Sloane (1965).

Montague's television credits include: Somerset Maugham TV Theatre, Espionage, The Four Just Men, Danger Man, The Baron, The Troubleshooters, Department S, Dixon of Dock Green, The Sweeney, Holocaust, Space: 1999, Minder, The Chinese Detective, Bergerac, Bird of Prey, Dempsey and Makepeace, Jekyll & Hyde, Casualty and Waking the Dead. In the sitcom Seconds Out, he had a regular part as the manager of a boxer played by Robert Lindsay. In Bergerac, he played Henri Dupont in several episodes.

Montague was the first storyteller on the BBC children's programme Jackanory in 1965, and he narrated in fifteen episodes between 1965 and 1966.

== Personal life and death ==
Montague lived in South End Green, Hampstead, in north west London, for 65 years. He was known locally for helping to save Keats Library.

He was married to Ruth Goring, an actress, for 67 years, until her death in 2023. He had two children.

On 30 March 2025, Montague died at the age of 97.

== Selected filmography ==
- Moulin Rouge (1952)
- The Silent Enemy (1958)
- The Camp on Blood Island (1958)
- Blind Date (1959)
- The Savage Innocents (1960)
- Foxhole in Cairo (1960)
- Edgar Wallace Mysteries (1961) Episode: Man at the Carlton Tower
- The Secret Partner (1961)
- The Singer Not the Song (1961)
- Billy Budd (1962)
- Operation Snatch (1962)
- Walt Disney's Wonderful World of Color: The Horse Without A Head (1963) (Two Episodes)
- Edgar Wallace Mysteries (1963) Episode: Five to One (film)
- The Secret of Blood Island (1964)
- You Must Be Joking! (1965)
- Deadlier Than the Male (1967)
- How I Won the War (1967)
- Nobody Runs Forever (1968)
- The Spy Killer (1969)
- Morning Story (1970) as Danny Robbins
- Brother Sun, Sister Moon (1972)
- Eagle in a Cage (1972)
- The Best Pair of Legs in the Business (1973)
- Armchair Cinema (1974) TV film.
- Mahler (1974)
- Jesus of Nazareth (1977, TV series)
- Eleanor Marx (1977, TV series)
- Brass Target (1978) - Lucky Luciano
- Holocaust (1978)
- The Legacy (1978)
- The London Connection (1979)
- If You Go Down in the Woods Today (1981)
- Bergerac(1983) TV series
- Pope John Paul II (1984)
- Lady Jane (1986)
- Madame Sousatzka (1988)

== Selected theatre performances ==
- Dr Prentice in What the Butler Saw by Joe Orton. Directed by Braham Murray at the Royal Exchange, Manchester. (1977)
- Mr Antrobus in The Skin of Our Teeth by Thornton Wilder. Directed by Richard Negri and James Maxwell at the Royal Exchange, Manchester. (1977)
- Barney Cashman in Last of the Red Hot Lovers by Neil Simon. British premiere directed by Eric Thompson at the Royal Exchange, Manchester. (1979)
- Cyprien in Court in the Act by Maurice Hennequin. British premiere directed by Braham Murray at the Royal Exchange, Manchester. (1986)
- Alfredo Mezzabotta in Doctor Heart by Peter Muller. British premiere directed by Braham Murray at the Royal Exchange, Manchester. (1991)
