= Rasputin the Mad Monk =

1966 British film by Don Sharp

Rasputin, the Mad Monk
- Original French film poster
- Directed by: Don Sharp
- Written by: Anthony Hinds
- Produced by: Anthony Nelson Keys
- Starring: Christopher Lee; Barbara Shelley; Richard Pasco; Francis Matthews; Suzan Farmer; Dinsdale Landen; Renée Asherson
- Cinematography: Michael Reed
- Edited by: Roy Hyde
- Music by: Don Banks
- Production companies: Hammer Film Productions; Seven Arts
- Distributed by: Warner-Pathé Distributors
- Release dates: 6 March 1966 (UK); 6 April 1966 (US)
- Running time: 92 minutes
- Country: United Kingdom
- Language: English
- Budget: £100,000 (approx)

Rasputin the Mad Monk is a 1966 Hammer horror film directed by Don Sharp and starring Christopher Lee, Barbara Shelley, Francis Matthews, Suzan Farmer, Richard Pasco, Dinsdale Landen and Renée Asherson. It was released on a double bill with Hammer Films' The Reptile.

It is the largely fictionalized story of Grigori Rasputin, the Russian peasant-mystic who gained great influence with the Tsars prior to the Russian Revolution, although some of the events leading up to Rasputin's assassination are very loosely based on Prince Yusupov's account of the story. For legal reasons (Yusupov was still alive when the film was released), the character of Yusupov was replaced by Ivan (Matthews).

The emphasis is on Rasputin's terrifying powers both to work magic and to seduce women.

== Plot ==
In the Russian countryside, Rasputin heals the sick wife of an innkeeper, but seduces the innkeeper's daughter. A young man tries to kill him, but Rasputin cuts off his hand and then tries to rape the screaming daughter. People come from the inn and attack him, but he escapes to his monastery.

When he is later hauled before an Orthodox bishop for his sexual immorality and violence, the innkeeper springs to the monk's defense. Rasputin protests that he is sexually immoral because he likes to give God "sins worth forgiving". (Note: This is loosely based on Rasputin's rumoured connection to Khlysty, an obscure Christian sect which believed that those deliberately committing fornication, then repenting bitterly, would be closer to God.) He also claims to have healing powers in his hands, and is unperturbed by the bishop's accusation that his power comes from Satan. Ultimately, he is expelled from the monastery.

Rasputin heads for Saint Petersburg, where he forces his way into the home of Dr Zargo, from where he begins his campaign to gain influence over the Tsarina. He manipulates one of the Tsarina's ladies-in-waiting, Sonia, whom he uses to satisfy his voracious sexual appetite and gain access to the Tsarina. He places her in a trance and commands her to cause an apparent accident that will injure the czar's young heir Alexei, so that Rasputin can be called to court to heal him. After this success, he hypnotizes the Tsarina to replace her existing doctor with Zargo (who has previously been struck off after a scandal).

However, Rasputin's ruthless pursuit of wealth and prestige, and increasing control over the royal household, attracts opposition. When Rasputin rejects Sonia saying that she has served her purpose, she tries to kill him. Rasputin places Sonia in a trance telling her to destroy herself.

Sonia's brother, Peter, finds Sonia dead from cutting her wrists and is so enraged by Rasputin's seduction and killing of his sister, he enlists the help of Ivan, brother of Vanessa, a beautiful handmaiden of the Tsarina who has attracted Rasputin's attention, to bring about the monk's downfall. Peter, in challenging the monk, is horribly scarred by acid thrown in his face, and suffers a lingering death.

Tricking Rasputin into thinking his sister Vanessa is interested in him, Ivan arranges a supposed meeting. However, Zargo has poisoned the wine and chocolates, which the monk starts to consume. Soon, Rasputin collapses, but the poison is not enough to kill him. In the ensuing struggle between the three men, Zargo is stabbed by Rasputin and quickly dies, though not before grabbing onto Rasputin's leg and turning the battle against him. Ivan manages to throw Rasputin out of the window to his death.

== Cast ==
- Christopher Lee as Grigori Rasputin
- Barbara Shelley as Sonia Vasilyevna
- Richard Pasco as Dr Boris Zargo
- Francis Matthews as Ivan Kesnikov
- Suzan Farmer as Vanessa Kesnikova
- Dinsdale Landen as Peter Vasilyevich
- Renée Asherson as the Tsarina
- Derek Francis as the innkeeper
- John Welsh as the abbot
- Joss Ackland as the bishop
- Robert Duncan as the Tsarevich
- Alan Tilvern as patron
- Bryan Marshall as Vassily
- Brian Wilde as Vassily's father

== Production ==
Rasputin the Mad Monk was filmed back-to-back in 1965 with Dracula: Prince of Darkness, using the same sets at Hammer's Bray Studios. Lee, Matthews, Shelley and Farmer appeared in both films. In some markets, it was released on a double feature with The Reptile (1966).

It was the third collaboration between Christopher Lee and Don Sharp, following The Devil Ship Pirates and The Face of Fu Manchu.

Lee later said, "The only way you can present him is the way he was historically described. He was a lecher and a drunk, and definitely had healing powers. So he was a saint and a sinner... There were very few good sides to him. Rasputin is one of the best things I've done. "

"I think it's the best thing Chris Lee's ever done," said Sharp in 1992. "Rasputin was supposed to have had this ability to hypnotise people, well Chris practically developed that ability."

Filming started 8 June. Don Sharp says the budget was cut during filming, causing the loss of several key scenes. He also claims Yusupov's lawyers threatened Hammer shortly before filming was to commence, necessitating last minute rewriting of the script. Filming occurred at Bray Studios in Berkshire.

A scene of Sonia's suicide was filmed but not shown.

The original ending had the lifeless Rasputin lying on the ice with his hands held up to his forehead in benediction. However, it was considered controversial for religious reasons, and was removed. Stills of the original ending still exist.

Sharp says the final fight scene between Francis Matthews and Christopher Lee was greatly cut by Tony Keys when Sharp had to leave the film during editing. Sharp had greatly enjoyed the experience of making his first two Hammer films – Kiss of the Vampire and Devil Ship Pirates – but not Rasputin.

As a child in the 1920s, Lee had actually met two of Rasputin's killers, Felix Yusupov and Dmitri Pavlovich; in later life Lee met Rasputin's daughter Maria.

A novelization of the film was written by John Burke as part of his 1967 book The Second Hammer Horror Film Omnibus.

== Reception ==
=== Critical ===
The Monthly Film Bulletin wrote: "The Rasputin legend is enough of a blend of historical fact and embroidered myth to merit something more than this undistinguished melodrama has to offer. Don Sharp's direction makes little attempt to capture the essence of the crumbling splendour of the Tsarist court, and Christopher Lee's towering presence is at odds with the ordinariness of the script. Only in the final sequence, with Rasputin pacing restlessly round a room picking at a box of poisoned chocolates while his assassins cower in the shadows, is any life injected into the proceedings. For the most part the film moves at a determinedly leisurely pace, never getting anywhere near the real Rasputin. And we are reminded that this is a Hammer production by gratuitous shots of a hacked-off hand and a face scarred by acid burns. The sets have an artificial gloss, the interiors are shot in garish colours, and with the exception of Richard Pasco, who lends some depth to his performance as Rasputin's drunken doctor colleague, the players parade round the settings like a row of sore thumbs. "

Variety wrote: "This British import, to be released as top-half of a double bill with The Reptile is a worthy entry, if not a classic, for the shocker market. As the screen peccadilloes of Russia's bad boy have, in ithe past, wound up in court, producer Anthony Nelson Keys had scripter John Elder take a somewhat fanciful (and unbelievable) approach to the subject. As a result, the dastardly villain has been given some attributes that are certainly colorful. Actually, this Hammer Film effort's surface appeal, in its really first-class color photography, art direction and professional casting, makes the thin plot immaterial. Christopher Lee's Rasputin is completely in character – huge, deep-voiced, compelling stare – oh, he's a proper rascal – and this variation makes him also a dancer (not that one ever sees a long shot of dancing. It's usually his upper half, then cut to a real dancer's feet, then back). ...The shocker mood is set early when the libertine holy man, fighting off a young assailant, chops off his hand with a scythe. ... Don Banks' score is also a big assist in underscoring suspense and action."

The film has an approval rating of 43% on Rotten Tomatoes, based on seven reviews. Lee receives praise for his performance.

=== Box office ===
According to Fox records, the film and The Reptile needed to earn $1,200,000 in rentals to break even. It made $1,645,000, and so a profit.

== Additional sources ==
- Koetting, Christopher (1995). "Costume Dramas". Hammer Horror.
- Murphy, Mike (July–August 1992). "Rasputin the Mad Monk". Dark Terrors. pp. 22–24.
- "Rasputin the Mad Monk – Report on the Whole Film". Hammer Horror. No. 4. 1995. pp. 23–31.
