= Anthony Nelson Keys =

British film producer (1911–1985)

Anthony Nelson Keys (13 November 1911 – 19 March 1985) was a British film producer, best known of his work with Hammer Film Productions. His father was Nelson Keys and his brother John Paddy Carstairs.

== Select filmography ==
- The Curse of Frankenstein (1957)
- Quatermass 2 (1957)
- The Steel Bayonet (1957)
- Horror of Dracula (1958)
- The Revenge of Frankenstein (1958)
- The Pirates of Blood River (1961)
- The Devil Ship Pirates (1964)
- The Gorgon (1964)
- Rasputin: The Mad Monk (1965)
- The Witches (1966)
- The Reptile (1966)
- The Devil Rides Out (1967)
- The Mummy's Shroud (1967)
- Frankenstein Created Woman (1967)
- Quatermass and the Pit (1967)
- Lock Up Your Daughters! (1969)
- Frankenstein Must Be Destroyed (1969)
- Nothing But the Night (1973)
