= Ashley Sidaway =

British film writer

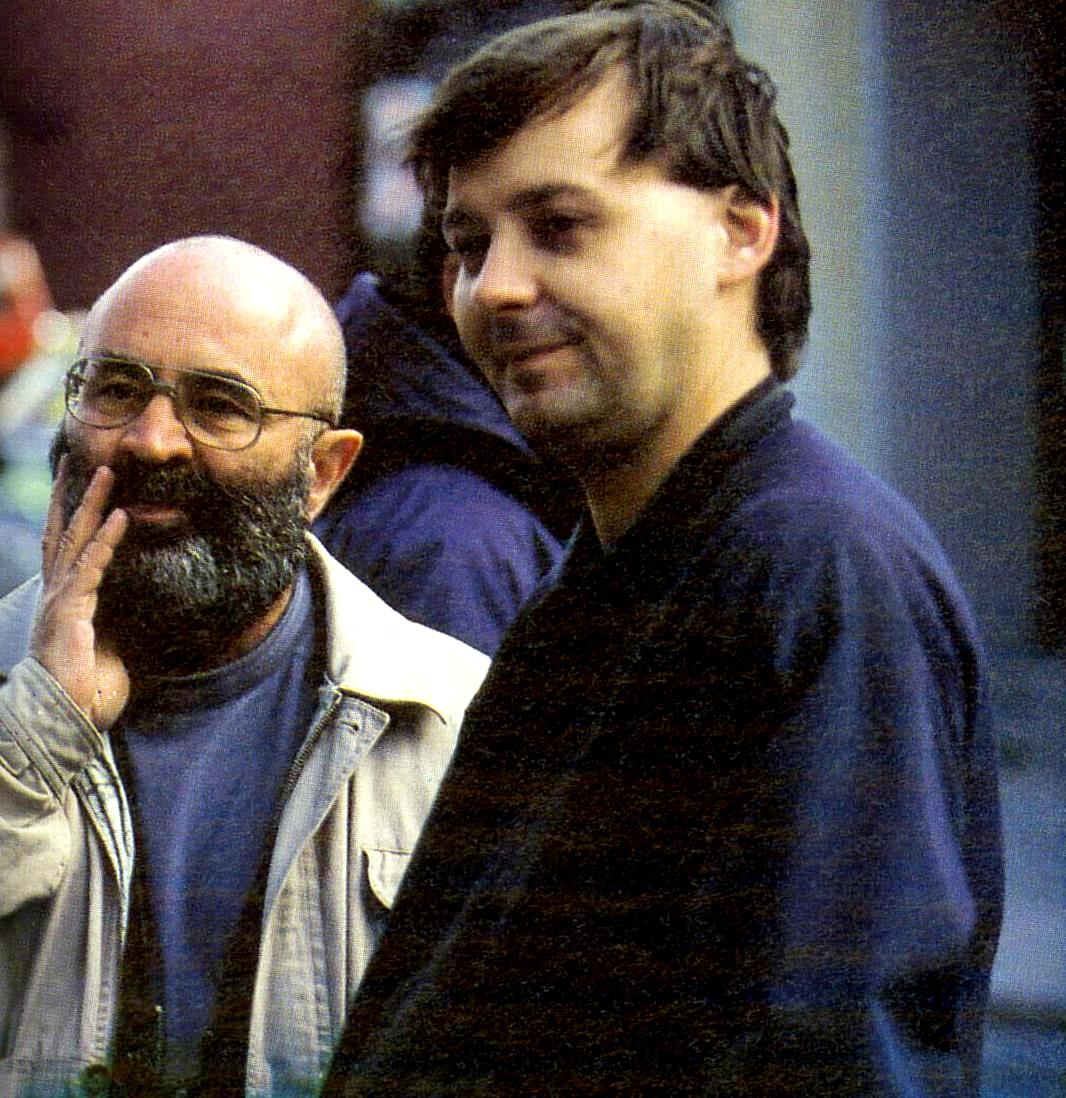
- Bob Hoskins & Ashley Sidaway 1994
- Born: London, United Kingdom
- Occupations: Film writer, producer, editor

Ashley Sidaway is a writer, producer and editor working in film and television. His films include Rainbow, Battle of the Brave (Nouvelle-France) and Joy Division as well as the long-running BBC TV series Best Of British.

As creator / writer and supervising film editor of Rainbow, Sidaway spent a year in post-production on the first all-digital movie released theatrically.

Sidaway's latest film is Into The Rainbow / The Wonder on which he is a writer and producer.

== Early life and education ==
Sidaway was born in London, United Kingdom son of producer, writer, actor Robert Sidaway and actress Maggie Don.

He was educated at Brighton College and King's College London.

== Early career ==
Ashley Sidaway trained as an Assistant Editor for editor John Daniels in London on sports and documentary TV programming between 1978-80.

In the summer of 1981 he was a production assistant in Cabo San Lucas, Mexico during the shoot of a pilot for the silent comedy series The Optimist and was subsequently assistant editor during post-production in Los Angeles. He then worked as a camera assistant / technical assistant for both the first season shot on location in Los Angeles during the summer of 1982 and the second season filmed in London during the summer of 1984. The series was first previewed on Channel 4's opening night (2 November 1982) and the series commenced on 14 April 1983.

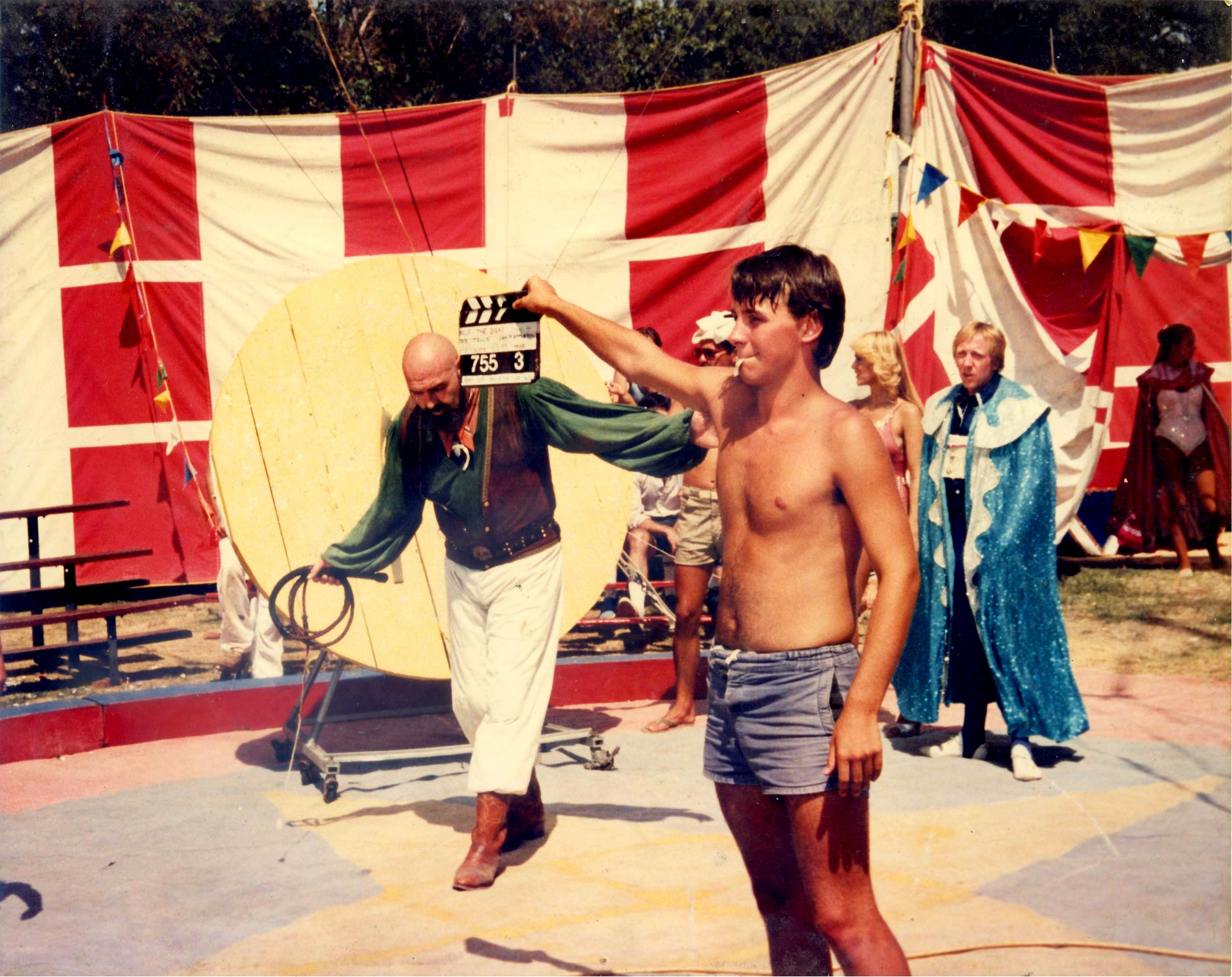
Ashley Sidaway filming on location in Los Angeles for the TV series The Optimist

During 1984 and 1985 Sidaway worked for Crystal Film & Video in London as a freelance assistant cameraman to various independent production companies as well as on news / current affairs and documentary programmes for the BBC.

In 1986, Sidaway researched and contributed to the script of the BBC documentary Around The World In Seven Minutes And Four Times On Saturday, about the Pathé News and Movietone News cinema newsreels and their lead commentators Bob Danvers-Walker and Leslie Mitchell.

== Best Of British / Winchester Pictures ==
In 1986 Sidaway co-created, wrote and edited the first season of the TV series Best Of British, 10 x 30 minute programs that examined some of the classic British films made by the Rank Organisation through an extensive use of clips. The first season commenced on 22 April 1987 on BBC One.

The success of the first season led to four further seasons and Sidaway worked in the same capacity on the further fifty seven episodes all of which premiered on BBC One. Narrated by John Mills and Anthony Quayle the programs provided a comprehensive look at British films from 1930s to the 1980s. The final season was originally shown in 1994.

He also co-wrote a book based on the first series.

Using the same format, in 1990 Sidaway subsequently co-created, wrote and edited the TV series The World of Hammer which looked at the output of Hammer Film Productions. Narrated by Oliver Reed, thirteen episodes were produced and the series premiered on Channel 4 in the UK on 12 August 1994.

Best Of British Film & Television was established in 1986 and Sidaway became Creative Director for the company, overseeing the creative output of TV programs, documentaries and video specials. On a majority of these also directed, edited, wrote and supervised all stages of production.

In 1989 he formed Winchester Pictures with Robert Sidaway to handle the development of feature film projects. In 1995 took Winchester to the AIM market as Winchester Entertainment plc.

In 1990 commissioned by Channel 4 and director Phil Agland to write the screenplay adaptation of Thomas Hardy's The Woodlanders. Film shot during 1996 / 1997 and released 1998.

During 1991 wrote a screenplay loosely adapted from the 1957 Rank film Hell Drivers (film) for MGM and a remake of Four Sided Triangle in conjunction with Hammer Film Productions. He also wrote a new screenplay based on the 1961 sci-fi thriller The Day The Earth Caught Fire in conjunction with Schindler-Swerdlow Productions for 20th Century-Fox.

In late 1992 Sidaway wrote and directed a ten-part documentary series The Gurgling Gourmet for Granada TV.

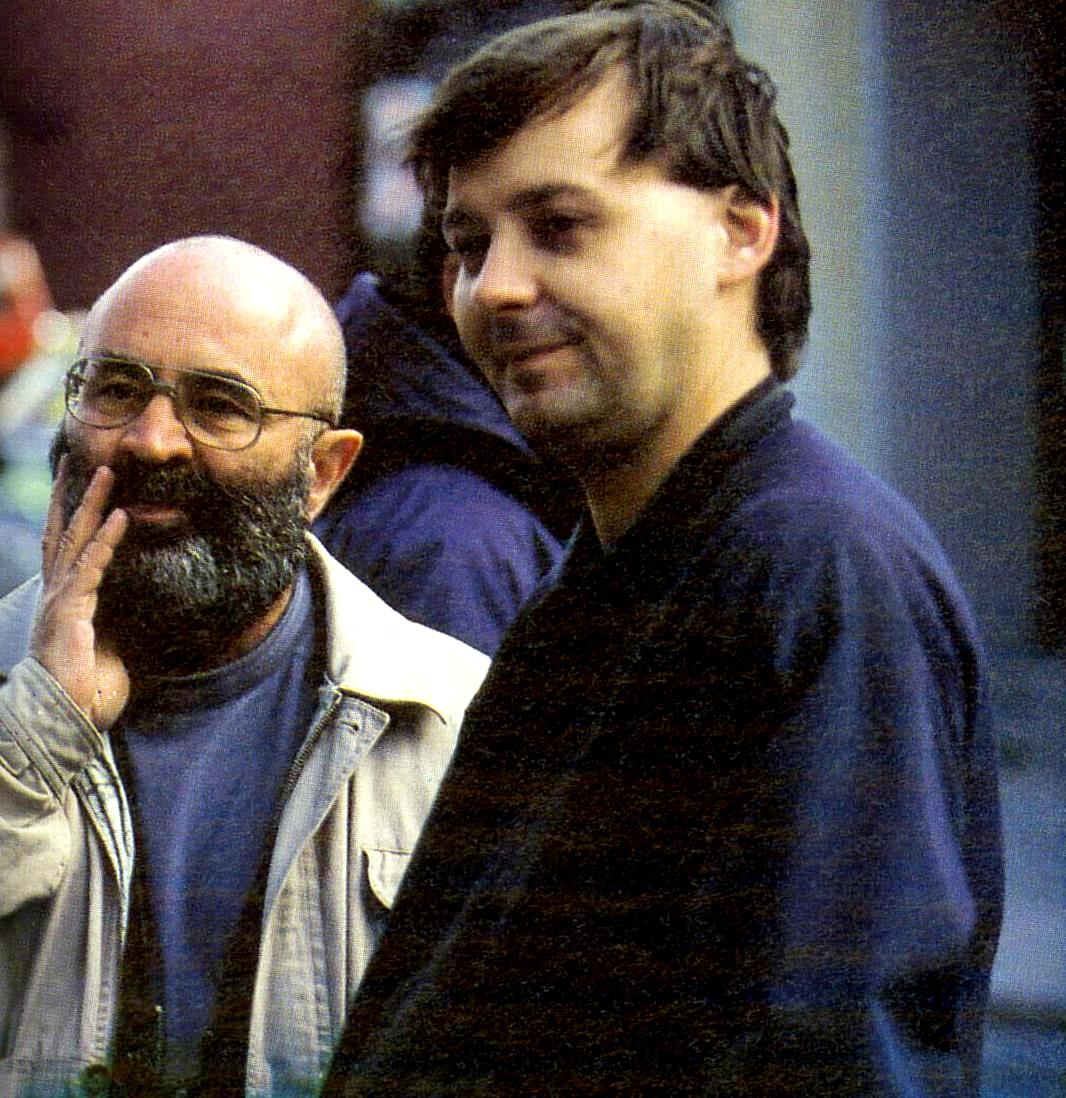
Director Bob Hoskins and writer Ashley Sidaway on location in Montreal during filming of Rainbow

He also completed the script Legacy, adapted from Nigel Kneale's classic 50s Quatermass and the Pit (film). The project was developed with Trilogy Entertainment Group.

During 1994 and 1995 co-wrote and edited Rainbow, the family entertainment feature film starring Bob Hoskins, Dan Aykroyd and Terry Finn. Rainbow premiered at the CineMagic Film Festival in December 1995 and opened worldwide during 1996. It was the first theatrically distributed all digital feature film.

== Independent Productions ==
During 1995 co-founded The International Football Hall Of Fame and worked over a four-year period to establish the brand and project. Developed in association with Granada Media and the Mirror Group.

In 1998 wrote, directed and produced the series, Witness - Events Of The 20th Century, introduced and narrated by David Frost for international television and video distribution by Primetime. The series was originally released in October 1999 and comprised thirteen 52 minute episodes.

During 1999 / 2000, Sidaway was a writer on the sword and sorcery television adventure The Dark Knight. Originally brought in to establish the tone of the series, he ended up writing seven scripts during the two seasons. Shot on location in New Zealand, the series was first shown on Channel 5 commencing 1 July 2000.

Producers Ashley Sidaway, Robert Sidaway and Richard Goudreau in Prague, June 2004, during the orchestral recording sessions for the film Nouvelle France

Between 2000 and 2008, Sidaway was involved as Producer, Executive Producer or Co-Producers on feature films including: Nouvelle France starring Gérard Depardieu, Irène Jacob, Vincent Pérez, Tim Roth and Jason Isaacs; My First Wedding starring Rachael Leigh Cook; Modigliani starring Andy Garcia; School for Seduction starring Kelly Brook and Emily Woof; Day Of Wrath starring Christopher Lambert; Joy Division starring Ed Stoppard and Bernard Hill; The Piano Player starring Christopher Lambert, Dennis Hopper and Diane Kruger; Silence Becomes You starring Alicia Silverstone and Sienna Guillory; Save Angel Hope starring Billy Boyd, Eva Birthistle and Bernard Hill; and Forest of the Gods based on the classic novel Forest of the Gods by Balys Sruoga and starring Steven Berkoff.

From 2008-10 acted as audio-visual producer for the Ultra Green Group, creating and producing over 60 films showing the green technologies the company was implementing worldwide.

In 2010 wrote and directed the first series of 13 episodes of the animated "Chuck the Eco Duck". In addition wrote and produced the first audio series of 14 shows for audio / radio.

During 2011 and 2012 developed and wrote the film "Iron", based on the birth of the industrial revolution at Ironbridge. During 2013 Sidaway was an editor and consulting producer on the documentary "Medjugorge - Myth Or Miracle".

=== Into The Rainbow / 奇迹：追逐彩虹 / The Wonder: Chasing Rainbows ===
In 2011, Sidaway created and wrote the story for the action fantasy feature film The Wonder and wrote the original drafts of the screenplay during 2012.

The film shot on location in Qingdao, China and Auckland, New Zealand between October and December 2015.

It stars Willow Shields, Wu Lei, Joe Chen, Maria Grazia Cucinotta, Archie Kao and Christy Chung.

The film was shown at the TIFF Kids International Film Festival during April 2017.

The film received its U.S. Premiere with a Gala Screening at the Savannah Film Festival on 4 November 2017.

Sidaway has also co-written with Robert Sidaway the book based on the original story.

== Friendship Films ==
Friendship Films was initially established in 2015 to produce The Wonder and thereafter to develop and produce various film and TV projects.

During 2018, Sidaway created, wrote, edited and produced the documentary series Cult-tastic: Tales From The Trenches With Roger And Julie Corman, which comprises thirteen 50-minute episodes on the career of filmmakers Roger Corman and Julie Corman. It was filmed over a four month period in Los Angeles, California and features over 130 movies. The series is a co-production between Shout! Studios (the production arm of Shout! Factory) and Ace Film HK in association with Friendship Films.

== Film and Television Productions ==
Production	Year		
The Optimist (TV series)	1981-1984	(production assistant / assistant editor)	13 episodes
Around The World In Seven Minutes And Four Times On Saturday	1985	(researcher / writer)	
Best Of British	1987-1994	(creator / writer / editor)	67 episodes
Wicked Willie	1990	(writer / editor)	
When The Quiff Was King	1990	(creator / producer / editor)	
Keepers: The Glory & The Tears	1990	(executive producer)	
Great English Golf Courses	1991	(director / writer / editor)	
Genesis: A History	1991	(creative consultant)	
The World of Hammer	1994	(creator / writer / editor)	13 episodes
Rainbow	1996	(writer / story / supervising editor)	
Irish Lighthouses: Sentinels of the Sea	1997	(writer / editor)	
Witness - Events Of The 20th Century	1999	(writer / director / producer)	13 episodes
Dark Knight	2000	(writer)	7 episodes
The Piano Player	2002	(associate producer)	
Nouvelle France	2004	(executive producer)	
School for Seduction	2004	(executive producer)	
Silence Becomes You	2005	(co-producer)	
Dievu miskas / Forest Of The Gods	2005	(executive producer)	
Joy Division	2006	(executive producer)	
Day Of Wrath	2006	(producer)	
My First Wedding	2006	(co-producer)	
Save Angel Hope	2007	(co-producer)	
Chuck The Eco Duck	2009	(writer / director)	14 episodes
Medjugorje: Myth Or Miracle	2013	(consulting producer / editor)	
Into The Rainbow / The Wonder	2016	(story / writer / producer)	
Cult-tastic: Tales From The Trenches With Roger And Julie Corman	2018	(creator / writer / producer)	13 episodes
