= Robert Sidaway (actor) =

English writer, producer, director and actor (1942–2024)

- Born: 24 January 1942; Wolverhampton, West Midlands, England
- Died: 16 August 2024 (aged 82); Thailand
- Occupations: Film producer, writer, actor
- Spouse: Margaret Don (m. 1964, divorced) Sandra Miller (m. 1977, divorced)
- Children: 2

Robert Sidaway (24 January 1942 – 16 August 2024) was an English writer, producer, director and actor. His credits as writer or producer for film and television include Rainbow (1996), Battle of the Brave (2004), Best Of British (1987–94) and Into The Rainbow / The Wonder (2017).

As a stage actor, Sidaway appeared in several West End theatre productions and numerous provincial and international tours, including Number 10 and The Magistrate, both with Alastair Sim. On screen, he performed in film and television, including two Doctor Who serials: as Avon in The Savages (1966) and Captain Jimmy Turner in The Invasion (1968).

== Early life ==
Sidaway was born in Wolverhampton, the son of industrialist Ronald "Bill" Sidaway, Chairman and Managing Director of Ductile Steels, and Beryl Cynthia Webb. He was educated at Tettenhall College, Wolverhampton, and Trent College, Derbyshire.

== Acting career and theatre production ==
Sidaway commenced his theatrical career in repertory at the Grand Theatre, Wolverhampton, in 1958, and at the Oxford Playhouse in 1959 before he studied at the London Academy of Music and Dramatic Art.

Sidaway subsequently appeared in numerous UK provincial and international productions, including at: Chesterfield Civic Theatre (1962); Pitlochry Festival Theatre (Scotland) (1963); Flora Robson Playhouse (Newcastle upon Tyne) (1964) in The Importance of Being Earnest; Leatherhead Theatre (1966) as the title character in Mother Goose and The Mate in Dick Whittington; Theatre Royal, Windsor (1966) in Pride and Prejudice; Richmond Theatre (1966) in Macbeth; O’Keefe Centre (Toronto) (1967); and Chichester Festival Theatre (1969) in Antony and Cleopatra, The Country Wife, The Caucasian Chalk Circle and The Magistrate.

=== West End productions as actor ===
- A Public Mischief by Kenneth Horne, directed by Harold French, with George Cole, Amanda Barrie, Charles Lloyd-Pack and Elspeth March. Originally opened at the Theatre Royal, Newcastle upon Tyne on 19 April 1965 before transferring to the St Martin's Theatre, London
- Number 10 by Ronald Millar, directed by David Scase, with Alastair Sim, Michael Denison, Dulcie Gray and John Gregson. Premiered at the King's Theatre, Glasgow on 29 August 1967 and toured Canada in October 1967 before opening at the Strand Theatre in London.

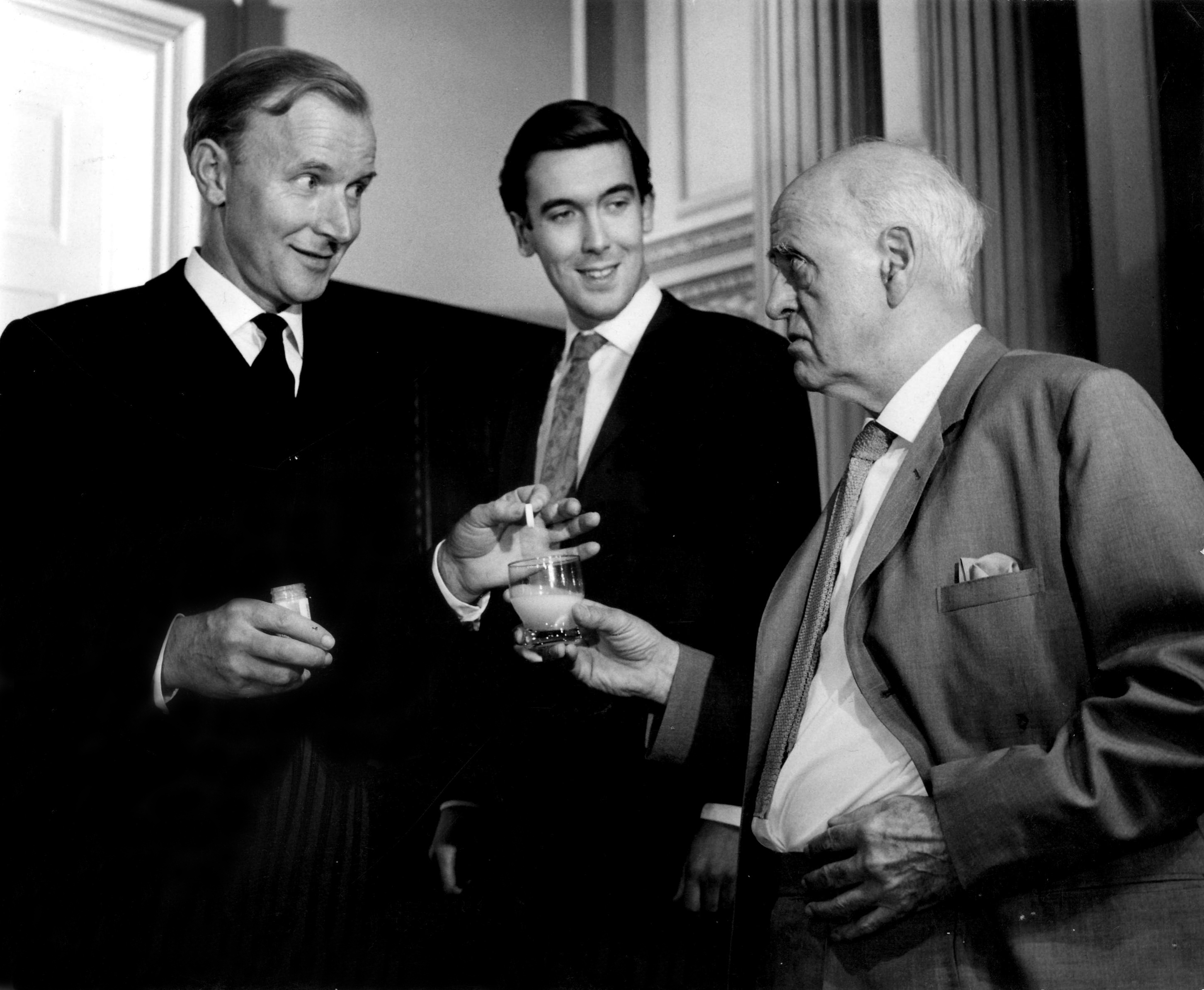
Sidaway (centre) in stage play Number 10 with Michael Denison and Alastair Sim (1967)

- The Magistrate by Arthur Wing Pinero, directed by John Clements, with Alastair Sim, Patricia Routledge, Michael Aldridge, Renée Asherson and Robert Coote. Originally opened at the Chichester Festival Theatre on 21 May 1969 before transferring to the Cambridge Theatre, London on 18 September 1969
- Abelard and Heloise by Ronald Millar, directed by Robin Phillips, with Diana Rigg, Keith Michell, Timothy West and Elspeth March. Originally opened at the Wyndham's Theatre, London on 19 May 1970
- The Wild Duck by Henrik Ibsen, directed by Glen Byam Shaw, with Michael Denison, Dulcie Gray, Alfred Lynch, Norman Wooland and Hayley Mills. Opened at the Criterion Theatre, London on 10 November 1970

=== Television and film productions as actor ===
- ITV Play of the Week (The Gentle Assassin) (1962)
- Tales of Mystery (The Call) (1962)
- It Happened Like This (The Diamond Hairslide) (1962)
- Bold As Brass (1963)
- Suspense (Protection) (1963)
- No Hiding Place (The Gamblers) (1963)
- Emergency – Ward 10 (1964)
- Sergeant Cork (The Case of the Hangman's Noose) (1964)
- Out of the Unknown (The Midas Plague) (1965)
- Doctor Who (The Savages) (1966)
- Emergency – Ward 10 (1967)
- The Further Adventures of the Musketeers (The Last Enemy) (1967)
- The Avengers (All Done with Mirrors) (1968)
- Doctor Who (The Invasion) (1968)
- A Nice Girl Like Me (1969)
- Villains (His Dad Named Him After the General) (1972)
- Crossroads (1973)
- The Optimist (Kid's Stuff) (1983)
- Joy Division (2006)
- Chuck the Eco Duck (2009)

Sidaway in recording sessions for the animated series Chuck The Eco Duck, 14 April 2010

=== Theatre production ===
During the early 1970s, Sidaway worked in public relations and marketing for London theatre managements, in particular for producer John Gale, and from 1972 he was involved in No Sex Please, We're British at London's Strand Theatre. It became the world's longest running comedy play.

Sidaway subsequently moved into theatre production and produced and presented such productions as:

- Darling Mr. London written by Anthony Marriott and Bob Grant, directed by Anthony Wiles and starring David Jason, Bob Grant and Valerie Leon (UK tour) (1975)
- Birds Of A Feather (UK tour) (1975)
- Joseph and the Amazing Technicolor Dreamcoat (UK tour) (1975)
- The Loudest Tears In Town starring Rodney Bewes and Gemma Craven (Thorndike Theatre, Leatherhead) (1976)
- Anastasia (pre-London tour and West End season) (1976)

Anastasia was written Marcelle Maurette and Guy Bolton, directed by Tony Craven and starred Nyree Dawn Porter, Peter Wyngarde, Elspeth March, David Nettheim, David Griffin and Ray Gatenby. It toured selected UK theatres, including the Theatre Royal, Brighton before opening at the Cambridge Theatre, London on 15 October 1976.

== Writer and producer for film and television ==
Sidaway's first film production work was for the Central Office of Information on documentaries and weekly news programmes. He also wrote television drama series for both BBC and ITV, including Crossroads.

In 1977 Sidaway co-created and co-produced the documentary series The Game Of The Century which consisted of six 30-minute programmes leading up to the 1978 FIFA World Cup in Argentina. It was first shown on BBC1 commencing on 23 April 1978. He also co-wrote (with Bob Wilson) the accompanying book based on the series.

Two further sports documentary series followed, The Game of The Century, World Cup ’82 (BBC) and A Choice of Champions (CBS), made for the 1984 Summer Olympics.

Between 1981 and 1984 Sidaway produced and co-wrote The Optimist, a silent comedy series for Channel 4 (UK). The pilot was independently financed and shot in Cabo San Lucas, Mexico in 1981 and was subsequently commissioned for a further six episodes by Cecil Korer, Programme Purchaser and Commissioning Editor for Light Entertainment at Channel 4. The first season was shot entirely in Los Angeles and was previewed on Channel 4's opening night (2 November 1982). The series commenced on 14 April 1983, following which a second series of six episodes was commissioned and filmed on location in London in 1984. The episode "The Fall Of The House Of Esher" was nominated for the Rose d'Or, Montreux in 1985.

In 1985 Sidaway co-produced the Irish location shoot for the American soap Search for Tomorrow for NBC. At this time he was working extensively in Los Angeles on film and television projects.

The Optimist was co-produced with Charisma Films and until 1987 Sidaway was Head Of Production for Charisma, developing films such as Sellers On Sellers, based on the life of Peter Sellers and Extra Time (later written as United).

=== Best of British and Winchester Pictures ===
In 1985 Sidaway produced the one-hour special Around The World In Seven Minutes And Four Times On Saturday, about the Pathé News and Movietone News cinema newsreels and their lead commentators Bob Danvers-Walker and Leslie Mitchell.

He subsequently formed Best of British Films & Television Limited and for four years co-created, co-wrote and produced 67 half-hours of Best Of British (BBC 1), a history of British film narrated by John Mills and Anthony Quayle which commenced on 22 April 1987. He also co-wrote a book based on the first series which looked at the classic films of the Rank Organisation.

In 1990 he co-created, co-wrote and produced 13 episodes of The World Of Hammer for Channel 4, a history of Hammer Film Productions narrated by Oliver Reed. The company also produced documentaries and video specials, including Genesis - A History, a ninety-minute co-production with BBC on the music band Genesis, and Wicked Willie, the animated series.

During 1989 Sidaway formed Winchester Pictures, a rights and development company for feature films and TV movies, and wrote and developed remakes of Hell Drivers, The Day The Earth Caught Fire and Four Sided Triangle as well as supervising development of Legacy, a film based on the sci-fi thriller "Quatermass and the Pit".

During 1992–1993 he worked at Twentieth Century Fox on The Day The Earth Caught Fire with co-producer with Ezra Swerdlow.

Having founded Winchester Pictures in 1989, Sidaway took Winchester Entertainment to the Alternative Investment Market in 1994 and was Head Of Production for the public company.

During 1994-95 Sidaway produced and co-wrote Rainbow, the family entertainment feature film starring Bob Hoskins, Dan Aykroyd, Jacob Tierney and Terry Finn. Shot on location in Montreal from September to December 1994, this was the first theatrically distributed all digital feature film. The film was made in association with Sony High Definition at Sony Pictures Studios in Los Angeles and was released during 1996. He also co-wrote the novel based on the original screenplay.

=== Independent productions ===
During 1995 Sidaway co-founded "The International Football Hall Of Fame" to develop and finance a unique football concept, worldwide media business and Manchester-based visitor attraction. Developed in association with Granada Media Group and Mirror Group Newspapers, the first election took place in 1997-98.

During 1999–2000 he co-wrote the TV series Dark Knight (Channel 5) and developed further film projects.

Between 2000 and 2008, some of the films on which Sidaway was Producer or Executive Producer included:

Nouvelle France starring Gérard Depardieu, Irène Jacob, Vincent Pérez, Tim Roth and Jason Isaacs; My First Wedding starring Rachael Leigh Cook; Modigliani starring Andy Garcia; School for Seduction starring Kelly Brook and Emily Woof; Day Of Wrath starring Christopher Lambert; Joy Division starring Ed Stoppard and Bernard Hill; The Piano Player starring Christopher Lambert, Dennis Hopper and Diane Kruger;Silence Becomes You starring Alicia Silverstone and Sienna Guillory; Save Angel Hope starring Billy Boyd, Eva Birthistle and Bernard Hill; and Forest of the Gods a Lithuanian-language film based on the classic novel starring Steven Berkoff.

From 2008 to 2010 acted as audio-visual producer and writer on over 60 short films examining climate change and green technologies.

In 2008 created the character of Chuck the Eco Duck and subsequently wrote and produced the pilot about the continuing tales of a caring, socially minded duck and his adventures on the farm and across the world. In 2010 wrote and produced the first series of 13 episodes. In addition wrote and produced the first audio series of 14 shows, which were first broadcast on Fun Kids radio in the UK.

During 2011 and 2012 developed and wrote the film "Iron", based on the birth of the industrial revolution at Ironbridge Gorge. During 2013 Sidaway was an editor and consulting producer on the documentary "Medjugorge - Myth Or Miracle".

David L. Snyder, Douglas Trumbull and Sidaway in Beijing, January 27, 2015

On 27 January 2015, Sidaway presented a screening and discussion on high frame rate film making to industry leaders in Beijing, China. He organized for respected film production designer David L. Snyder and innovative film maker Douglas Trumbull to be present. Trumbull's experimental short UFOTOG was shown in 4K, 3D, 120 fps.

=== Into The Rainbow / 奇迹：追逐彩虹 / The Wonder: Chasing Rainbows ===
In 2011, Sidaway created and wrote the story for the action fantasy feature film originally titled The Wonder and wrote the original drafts of the screenplay during 2012.

The film was first announced during the American Film Market in October 2012 with Willow Shields starring.

The film shot on location in Qingdao, China and Auckland, New Zealand between October and December 2015 as a co-production between the two countries.

It stars Willow Shields, Wu Lei, Joe Chen, Maria Grazia Cucinotta, Archie Kao and Christy Chung.

The film was shown at the TIFF Kids International Film Festival during April 2017.

The film received its U.S. Premiere with a Gala Screening at the Savannah Film Festival on 4 November 2017.

Sidaway also co-wrote the book based on the original story.

Difei Zhou and Sidaway on location for The Wonder in Qingdao, September 29, 2015

=== Friendship Films ===
Friendship Films was initially established in 2015 to produce The Wonder and thereafter to develop and produce various film and TV projects.

During 2018, Sidaway created, wrote and produced the documentary series Cult-tastic: Tales From The Trenches With Roger And Julie Corman, which consists of thirteen 50-minute episodes on the career of filmmakers Roger Corman and Julie Corman. It was filmed over a four month period in Los Angeles, California and features over 130 movies. The series is a co-production between Shout! Studios (the production arm of Shout! Factory) and Ace Film HK in association with Friendship Films.

== Personal life and death ==
Sidaway was married twice: to Margaret Don in 1964, with whom he had a son, Ashley; and to Sandra Miller in 1977, with whom he had a daughter, Kate. Both marriages ended in divorce.

In August 2024, Sidaway travelled through Sri Lanka with Ashley to set up a new film project called Rachel's Song. Their return took them through Malaysia and Thailand, where Sidaway was suddenly diagnosed with cancer, requiring emergency surgery. He died in Thailand on 16 August 2024, at the age of 82.

== Film and television productions as writer and/or producer ==
Production	Year		
The Game of the Century	1978	writer/producer	6 episodes
The Game of the Century	1982	writer/producer	
The Optimist	1981-1984	writer/producer	13 episodes
A Choice of Champions	1984	writer/producer	
Search for Tomorrow	1985	co-producer	
Around the World in Seven Minutes and Four Times on Saturday	1985	producer	
Best of British	1987-1994	creator/writer/producer	67 episodes
Wicked Willie	1990	producer	
When the Quiff Was King	1990	producer	
Keepers: The Glory and the Tears	1990	executive producer	
Great English Golf Courses	1991	producer	
Genesis: A History	1991	producer	
The World of Hammer	1994	creator/writer/producer	13 episodes
Rainbow	1996	writer/producer	
Dark Knight	2000	writer	
The Piano Player	2002	associate producer	
Nouvelle France	2004	producer	
Modigliani	2004	executive producer	
Silence Becomes You	2005	co-producer	
Forest of the Gods	2005	executive producer	
Joy Division	2006	executive producer	
Day of Wrath	2006	executive producer	
My First Wedding	2006	producer	
Chuck the Eco Duck	2009	creator/writer/producer	14 episodes
Medjugorje: Myth or Miracle	2013	consulting producer	
Into the Rainbow / The Wonder	2016	story/writer/producer	
Cult-tastic: Tales from the Trenches with Roger and Julie Corman	2018	creator/writer/producer	13 episodes
