= The World of Hammer =

- Genre: Documentary
- Created by: Robert Sidaway; Ashley Sidaway
- Written by: Robert Sidaway; Ashley Sidaway
- Narrated by: Oliver Reed
- Theme music composer: Brian Bennett
- Country of origin: United Kingdom
- Original language: English
- No. of seasons: 1
- No. of episodes: 13

Production
- Producer: Robert Sidaway
- Editor: Ashley Sidaway
- Running time: 25 minutes
- Production companies: Best of British Films & Television

Original release
- Network: Channel 4
- Release: 12 August – 4 November 1994

The World of Hammer is a British television documentary series created and written by Robert Sidaway and Ashley Sidaway, and produced by Robert Sidaway.

Narrated by Oliver Reed, the thirteen part series was produced in 1990 and originally broadcast on Channel 4 in 1994. It followed the same format as the creator's previous series on the history of British cinema, Best Of British, by looking at the films of Hammer Film Productions on a thematic basis.

== Episodes ==
1. HAMMER STARS: PETER CUSHING

Initial Broadcast Date: 12 August 1994

For over two decades, Peter Cushing brought an unparalleled dignity, grace and dramatic skill to his roles as Sherlock Holmes, Van Helsing, Baron Frankenstein and more, in dozens of classic movies. Whether being stoically heroic or sadistically diabolical, Cushing's work truly became the heart and soul of the Hammer Films dynasty.

Films included: The Abominable Snowman (1957) / The Brides Of Dracula (1960) / The Curse Of Frankenstein (1957) / Dracula (1958) / The Hound Of The Baskervilles (1959) / Fear In The Night (1972) / Frankenstein And The Monster From Hell (1974) / The Mummy (1959) / She (1965) / Twins Of Evil (1971)

2. DRACULA & THE UNDEAD

Initial Broadcast Date: 19 August 1994

For generations of moviegoers, Hammer Films defined the legend of Count Dracula. As portrayed by the Christopher Lee, the Count was brilliantly reborn as a seductive icon of forbidden desire and everlasting evil. Later, the studio would broaden their bloody palette of the undead to further redefine the entire vampire genre. Today, these movies remain among the most visually stunning and thematically provocative vampire films in all of movie history.

Films included: The Brides Of Dracula (1960) / Captain Kronos Vampire Hunter (1972) / Dracula (1958) / Dracula Prince Of Darkness (1966) / Kiss Of The Vampire (1962) / The Legend Of The 7 Golden Vampires (1974) / Scars Of Dracula (1970) / Vampire Circus (1972)

3. LANDS BEFORE TIME

Initial Broadcast Date: 26 August 1994

Few films had a greater impact on the '60s than the unforgettable genre known as ‘Hammer Glamours’ epics that delivered their own singular vision of history—and especially pre-history—with liberal doses of both flesh and fantasy. With special effects as eye-popping as the actresses, these films created puberty's essential bridge between the thrill of cool monsters and the sensation of gorgeous women.

Films included: Blood From The Mummy's Tomb (1971) / Creatures The World Forgot (1971) / The Lost Continent (1968) / One Million Years B.C. (1966) / She (1965) / The Vengeance of She (1968) / The Viking Queen (1967)

4. VAMP

Initial Broadcast Date: 1 September 1994

Through the years, Hammer's depiction of female vampires was consistently groundbreaking and always controversial. In exploring the fine line between forbidden desire and the curse of the undead, Hammer's vamps shocked critics and delighted audiences worldwide with explicit eroticism and stylish decadence.

Films included: The Brides Of Dracula (1960) / Captain Kronos Vampire Hunter (1972) / Dracula (1958) / Dracula Prince Of Darkness (1966) / Kiss Of The Vampire (1962) / Lust For A Vampire (1970) / Twins Of Evil (1971) / The Vampire Lovers (1970)

5. WICKED WOMEN

Initial Broadcast Date: 9 September 1994

The Wicked Women of Hammer included such cult stars and screen legends as Bette Davis, Ingrid Pitt, Joan Fontaine, Martine Beswick, Tallulah Bankhead, Lizabeth Scott and more. From savage horror to tense drama to high camp, these deadly dames delivered some of the most surprising and shocking performances of their entire careers in some of Hammer's most infamous films.

Films included: The Anniversary (1968) / Black Widow (1951) / Countess Dracula (1970) / Doctor Jekyll And Sister Hyde (1971) / Fanatic (1965) / The Nanny (1965) / Stolen Face (1952) / The Witches (1966)

6. TRIALS OF WAR

Initial Broadcast Date: 16 September 1994

Hammer's war films covered controversial stories such as The Camp on Blood Island and The Steel Bayonet, comedies including I Only Arsked and Further Up the Creek and even a remake of the 1938 classic The Lady Vanishes.

Films included: Break In The Circle (1955) / The Camp On Blood Island (1958) / Further Up the Creek (1958) / I Only Arsked (1958) / The Lady Vanishes (1979) / The Secret of Blood Island (1964) / Up the Creek (1958) / Ten Seconds To Hell (1959) / The Steel Bayonet (1957) / Yesterday's Enemy (1959)

7. SCI-FI

Initial Broadcast Date: 23 September 1994

Hammer's science-fiction films are a classic genre unto themselves. For nearly three decades, the studio presented fantastic tales of space travel, alien invasions, nuclear mutation, and more with a combination of rare intelligence and crowd-pleasing action. Even today, their adaptations of Nigel Kneale's Quatermass series remain provocative science fiction.

Films included: The Damned (1963) / Dick Barton Strikes Back (1949) / Frankenstein Created Woman (1967) / Quatermass 2 (1957) / Quatermass and the Pit (1967) / The Quatermass Xperiment (1955) / Spaceways (1953) / X the Unknown (1956)

8. MUMMIES, WEREWOLVES & THE LIVING DEAD

Initial Broadcast Date: 30 September 1994

Over the course of three decades, Hammer Films redefined the classic legends of the mummy, the werewolf and the zombie. More than mere "monster movies," these films were frightening new takes on familiar tales, complete with chilling scares, startling violence and the one-of-a-kind visual style that became a worldwide Hammer trademark.

Films included: Blood From The Mummy's Tomb (1971) / Captain Clegg (1962) / The Curse Of The Mummy's Tomb (1964) / Curse Of The Werewolf (1961) / The Legend Of The 7 Golden Vampires (1974) / The Mummy's Shroud (1967) / The Mummy (1959) / The Plague Of The Zombies (1965)

9. CHILLER

Initial Broadcast Date: 7 October 1994

Through the 1950s and 1960s, and running alongside production of the gothic horror films, Hammer made a series of what were known as "mini-Hitchcocks" mostly scripted by Jimmy Sangster, and directed by Freddie Francis and Seth Holt. These low-budget suspense thrillers, often in black-and-white, typically had a twist at the end of the tale.

Films included: Czech Mate (1984) (from Hammer House of Mystery and Suspense) / Hell is a City (1960) / The Last Page (1952) / Maniac (1963) / Paranoiac (1963) / Shatter (1974) / Whispering Smith Hits London (1952) / Straight On Till Morning (1972)

10. THE CURSE OF FRANKENSTEIN

Initial Broadcast Date: 14 October 1994

Based on Mary Shelley's novel, Hammer's startling cycle of Frankenstein films were equally as popular—and controversial—as their renowned Dracula series. In the studio's hands, the legend was reborn as explicit thrillers of gothic horror, all in gloriously gory colour. Portrayed by genre icon Peter Cushing, Baron Frankenstein emerged as a fascinating combination of visionary intelligence, heroic passion and diabolical obsession. As for Frankenstein's monsters, these are the creatures that changed the stitched-up face of horror forever.

Films included: The Curse Of Frankenstein (1957) / The Evil Of Frankenstein (1964) / Frankenstein And The Monster From Hell (1974) / Frankenstein Created Woman (1967) / Four Sided Triangle (1953) / Horror Of Frankenstein (1970) / The Revenge Of Frankenstein (1958)

11. HAMMER STARS: CHRISTOPHER LEE

Initial Broadcast Date: 21 October 1994

Christopher Lee was one of Hammer's most famous stars. From his debut in The Curse of Frankenstein, he went on to make the role of Count Dracula his own starring in eight of Hammer's Dracula productions. Lee also starred in many other of the studio's films from The Hound Of The Baskervilles (1959) to To the Devil a Daughter.

Films included: The Curse Of Frankenstein (1957) / The Devil Rides Out (1968) / The Devil-Ship Pirates (1964) / Dracula (1958) / Dracula Prince Of Darkness (1966) / The Hound Of The Baskervilles (1959) / The Mummy (1959) / Rasputin The Mad Monk (1965) / Scars Of Dracula (1970) / She (1965) / To the Devil a Daughter (1976)

12. HAMMER

Initial Broadcast Date: 28 October 1994

Hammer Films is one of the most famous independent British film production companies as well as one of the most successful. Its output continues to inspire many of the genre films made today and many of the cinema's foremost directors. This episode takes a general look across the various genres Hammer explored.

Films included: The Camp On Blood Island (1958) / Cloudburst (1951) / The Curse Of Frankenstein (1957) / Dracula (1958) / Holiday On The Buses (1973) / Men of Sherwood Forest (1954) / One Million Years B.C. (1966) / The Plague Of The Zombies (1965) / The Nanny (1965) / Quatermass 2 (1957) / Quatermass And The Pit (1967) / The Steel Bayonet (1857) / That's Your Funeral (1972)

13. COSTUMERS

Initial Broadcast Date: 4 November 1994

Films included: The Brigand Of Kandahar (1965) / A Challenge For Robin Hood (1967) / The Devil-Ship Pirates (1964) / Dick Turpin Highwayman (1956) / The Pirates Of Blood River (1962) / The Scarlet Blade (1963) / The Stranglers Of Bombay (1959) / Sword Of Sherwood Forest (1960) / Wolfshead: The Legend of Robin Hood (1969)

== Production credits ==
Narrated by Oliver Reed

Written and created by Ashley Sidaway and Robert Sidaway

Produced by Robert Sidaway

Series Edited by Ashley Sidaway

Title Theme Composed by Brian Bennett

On Line Editor Mike Peatfield

Sound Paul Hamilton

Assistant Editors Amanda Jenks, Alyssa Osment

Production Assistant Caroline Beecham

Production Manager Evan M. Jones

Production Secretary Joanne Atkins

For Hammer Films Graham Skeggs, Karen Woods, Wendy Smith

Post Production by Sound Developments Studios, Fountain Television, TV1

Film Archivists John Herron, Steve Rickersby, Mike Dragesic, Steve Leroux

Executive Producer John Thompson

Best of British format created by Ashley Sidaway, Robert Sidaway, Maurice Sellar, Lou Jones

Roy Skeggs Presents for Hammer Films / a Best of British Films & Television Production
