= Wicked Willie (series) =

1990 comedy animation series

Wicked Willie is a 1990 comedy animation series based on the character Wicked Willie and the internationally best-selling series of cartoon books about the continuing adventures of a man and his "best friend" (his penis). The series was directed by Bob Godfrey, produced by Robert Sidaway, and written by Gray Jolliffe with additional material by Ashley Sidaway, Peter Mayle and Ron Collins.

The series consisted of eleven episodes titled:

- Hello Willie

- Willie On Women

- Willie's Away

- Willie: The Father Of Invention

- Willie And Your Stars

- Willie Goes Green

- Willie Goes Down In History

- Willie On Men

- Danger: Willie At Work

- Willie Meets The Modern Miss

- Dear Willie

Though banned on television, the video releases were enormously successful when released on home video in 1990 and 1991. Linked by footage of the character of Wicked Willie performing stand-up comedy, the first release on VHS was titled Wicked Willie The Video. Subsequent versions were released as Wicked Willie The Movie and Wicked Willie Rides Again. The two releases have subsequently been re-issued in a single collection on DVD.
