= Rainbow (1996 film) =

- Rainbow promotional poster
- Directed by: Bob Hoskins
- Written by: Ashley Sidaway; Robert Sidaway
- Produced by: Robert Sidaway; Nicolas Clermont; Gary Smith
- Starring: Bob Hoskins; Terry Finn; Jacob Tierney; Saul Rubinek; Dan Aykroyd
- Cinematography: Freddie Francis
- Edited by: Ray Lovejoy; Ashley Sidaway (sup)
- Music by: Alan Reeves
- Production companies: Filmline International; Winchester Entertainment plc; Paragraph International; Screen Partners Ltd.
- Distributed by: First Independent Films
- Release date: July 26, 1996; (United Kingdom)
- Running time: 101 minutes
- Countries: United Kingdom; Canada
- Language: English
- Budget: US$10 million

Rainbow is a 1996 family adventure film directed by Bob Hoskins, written by Ashley Sidaway and Robert Sidaway and starring Hoskins, Terry Finn, Jacob Tierney, Saul Rubinek and Dan Aykroyd. The story concerns four children and a dog whose journey in a magical rainbow results in an adventure that finds them on a race against time to save the world.

Rainbow was the world's first all digital film, shot in high-definition videowith solid state electronic cinematography cameras from Sony. With over 35 minutes of digital image processing and visual effects, all post production, sound effects, editing and scoring were completed digitally. The digital HD image was transferred to 35mm negative using Sony's Electron Beam Recorder for theatrical release.

== Synopsis ==
Mike "Mikey" Bailey is a rambunctious boy living in Hudson Harbour, New Jersey with his grandfather Frank, a magician; his single mother Jackie, who works in the newsroom at a local TV station; and his older brother Steve, who is a loner and wishes to join a local gang of teenagers. Mike encounters a stray dog who he names Mutt, who leads him to a spot where he seemingly witnesses a rainbow actually land. He tells his friends Pete and Tessy of his encounter and takes them to the landing site, but they do not believe his claims. At the site they find a triangular crater. Tessy takes a soil sample and tests it, and the soil illuminates in colour and vanishes in her hand. Mike, Pete, and Tessy prepare a project to track down the next rainbow and examine it.

Eventually, a rainbow appears and the three, along with Steve and Mutt, race across town on their bicycles to get to the rainbow. Upon arrival, they witness it land and are sucked into a colourful passageway, taking photographs as they go. They are surrounded by sparkling lights, when turn into pieces of gold when touched. Steve pockets three of the pieces, which causes the rainbow to vanish and drop the group into a cornfield in Kansas. The farmer takes them to the office of sheriff Wyatt Hampton, who calls Jackie at work to make arrangements to send the kids home. The sheriff takes the kids to the airport, where they sneak away to get their pictures developed and lead the sheriff on a wild chase before boarding their flight. They arrive back in Hudson Harbor, where they are mobbed by reporters who had been tipped off by Jackie's boss. Jackie and Frank come to the children's aid, but everyone except Frank thinks the kids had stowed away on a flight to Kansas are lying about the rainbow. They get in trouble at school and turn the photos they took over to their science teacher, Sam Cohen.

The next day, colour begins to drain from the world, and people begin to either act aggressively towards each other or fall unconscious. Sam realizes that there weren't any flights that could've taken the children to Kansas in time, and after looking at their pictures, discovers their project and finds the crater. Steve sells one of the pieces of gold to a pawnshop, and uses the money to buy a motorcycle and leather jacket, and tries to use another piece to buy his way into the gang, but they gang beat him up and steal the bike, jacket, and gold from him.

The children, Frank, Jackie and Sam all deduce that due to Steve's removal of the gold pieces, the rainbow has been damaged and caused colour to be drained from the world, preventing plants from generating oxygen through photosynthesis. The group split up to retrieve the gold pieces. Mike and Frank break into the pawn shop and retrieve a piece of the gold, barely escaping the violent mobs roaming the streets. Steve, Pete and Sam go to the gang's hideout, which they fill with helium as a distraction so Steve can steal back his stuff. With time almost up before all the oxygen is gone from the world, Mike, Steve and Mutt race on his motorcycle through the violent mobs to the new rainbow's landing site. Mike and Mutt are absorbed by the rainbow, but Mike tosses the gold pieces back into it, causing a rain which restores color to the world. Mike and Mutt ride the rainbow to a tropical rainforest, as the film ends.

== Cast ==
- Willy Lavendel as Mike Bailey, the main character who seeks to chase the rainbow.
- Jacob Tierney as Steve Bailey, Mike's older brother who wants to join a local street gang.
- Jonathan Schuman as Pete, one of Mike's friends.
- Eleanor Misrahi as Tissy, Mike's other friend who shows great intelligence.
- Bob Hoskins as Frank Bailey, Mike's grandfather who is a skilled magician.
- Terry Finn as Jackie Bailey, Mike and Steve's mother.
- Saul Rubinek as Sam Cohen, a school science teacher.
- Dan Aykroyd as Sheriff Wyatt Hampton, the sheriff of Sativa Falls in Kansas.
- Richard Jutras as Deputy Clarence Head, Hampton's silent deputy who spitwads as a running gag.

== Production ==
Principal photography took place in Oxford and Montreal on 21 September 1994, the start of a nine-week shoot through to the end of November. This included two weeks of green screen studio filming.

Clarenceville, a 30-minute drive from Montreal, was the site of the important cornfield scenes (doubling for Kansas), and the opening and closing of the film features aerial footage in New York City and Hawaii. The remainder was shot in Montreal.

Montreal was chosen for the production site due its ideal mix of architecture and weather conditions. "When the script was originally written, the locale was set in Washington D.C." Visual Consultant, 2nd Unit Director and Executive Producer David L. Snyder stated. "When we arrived in Montreal Bob and I made the decision to change the locale to New Jersey and not move the production around, as we had found everything we needed in Quebec. A fictional city located in New Jersey can be fairly nondescript and much less identifiable than Boston, New York City, or Washington for that matter."

Hoskins chose Snyder to establish the appropriate look after their experience working together on Super Mario Bros.

Pre-production commenced at Ealing Studios, London prior to the move to Montreal. The Ealing conferences dealt with script readings and visual concepts, including some preliminary filming of various 'practical' man-made rainbows.

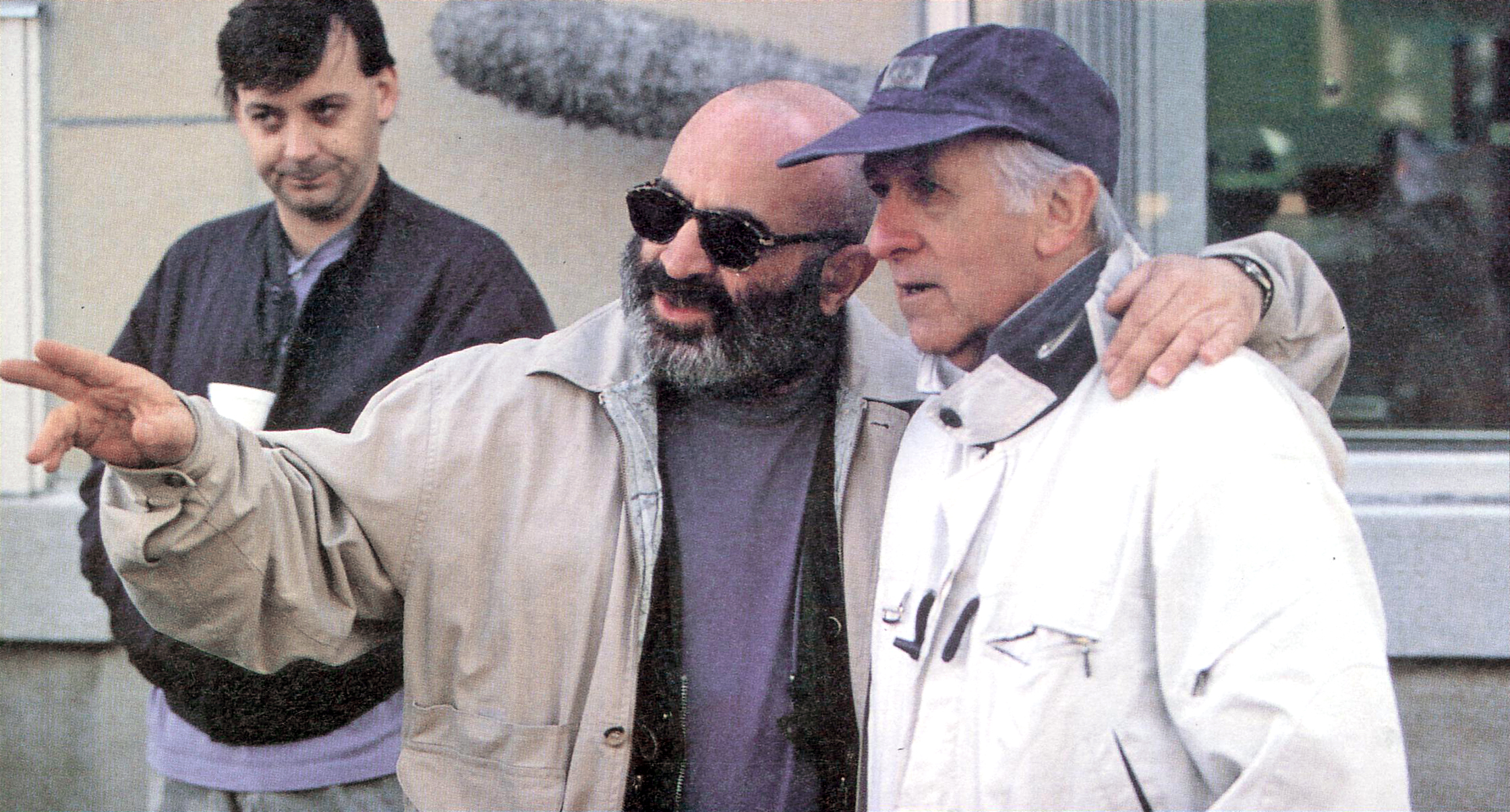
Bob Hoskins, Freddie Francis

Once in Canada, Snyder met with Production Designer Claude Pare and asked him to turn his concepts into reality, which included design ideas for the Hudson Harbor settings. A primary task involved taking a French-Canadian city and replacing all the French language signage with English language graphics and signage.

For a film that's featured set-piece is a ride through the Rainbow and whose story features the loss of colour to the world, costume designer Janet Campbell's role was especially important.

Each character's look was also designed to reflect his or her individuality. "Steve is one good example," says Campbell. "He's older than the other kids and is a rebel, so the colors I've chosen for him are darker. But toward the end, when his true nature begins to shine through, the colors of his clothing become brighter."

The best example of Campbell's attempts to showcase colour came in the guise of Jack The Prophet, the character which warns about the impending advent of doomsday.

In early October, in the area of Montreal known as the Plateau Mont Royal, the cast and crew spent several days filming both the inside and outside of an authentic American diner. The Galaxie Diner, transformed for the film into Ynez and Charlie's Galaxie Diner, serving Spanish-Chinese food, plays an important part of the film.

About seventy-five extras were needed to portray a mob brandishing baseball bats, overturning cars and generally causing havoc, as the world turns headlong into disaster. Opposing them are 15 members of Montreal's actual SWAT team (many of whom had prior experience working on films) and several mounted policemen.

The eight-strong stunt crew included veteran, five-time world karate champion, Jean Frenette. He performed the motorcycle jump over a car and through the deadly 'Wall of Fire', with a pillion rider seated behind him.

To achieve the floating quality for the interior of the Rainbow, originally the traditional special effects concept of harnesses and wire rigs hanging the actors from the rafters was suggested. However, the film's Visual Effects Supervisor, Steven Robiner, had a different idea. Robiner said "Aesthetics was my main concern; we wanted to show the kids really floating through the rainbow, and none of these actors were gymnasts so I felt strongly that it would be much easier for them to express this feeling of floating and weightlessness being underwater. It was also going to be much easier in the post production process to composite the children within the rainbow, and not have to worry about hand-painted wire-removal." Robiner's plan was to submerge a green screen inside a diving training pool that had an instructors' window, under the water, at the side. Fortunately, a nearby Montreal university, located in Montreal's east end, had exactly the type of pool he was looking for. At first this underwater concept was questioned as being too radically different and untried, however after Robiner pointed out this would also save the production about 3 days of shooting because more than 70% of the rainbow interior scenes could all be shot at this one single pool location with a locked off camera and lights, the producers agreed.

To help the children adjust to this potentially hostile environment, the producers engaged the services of aquatic consultant Daniel Berthiaume. Shooting under water lasted for two full days and Berthiaume was in the water for periods of three to five hours at a time.

The last portion of the shoot continued on a large sound stage in Montreal, where the Visual Effects segments involving the kids travelling through the rainbow was to be filmed. The stage's 3-story high walls and floor were all painted with the special green coloured paint necessary for the compositing process. Special mechanical seats, platforms and camera rigs concept designs were made by Steven Robiner and John Galt and then engineered and built by Special Effects Supervisor Antonio Vidosa and his crew. For a shot in which the four kids are to float, spinning in the form a circle with each child holding the hand of the kid on each side of them, with their heads together and feet at the outer edge, then they let go their hands and each spin off and away from the others. Originally it was suggested to do this with the four actors hanging on wires, but Robiner rejected that idea because "hanging four kids on wires just seemed to be a dangerous and time-consuming idea, on top of being difficult for them to perform in..."

To produce a shot in which the kids are supposed to be spinning head over heals while floating in the rainbow, another rig was used that let the actor remain motionless while the camera rotated 720 degrees over his head, behind his back, and then under his feet and up again. The old style HD cameras had umbilical cables for power and signal transmission which needed to be carefully wound around a large spool as the camera rotated.

== Royal connection ==
Autumn Kelly (age 17), later a member of the British royal family by marriage, has a small part as one of the Tigerette gang.

== Release ==
The film opened in the United Kingdom on 26 July 1996, with its primary competition at the box office coming in the form of the British premiere of the US disaster film Twister. It debuted at #9 at the British box office on its opening weekend, which also marked its only appearance in the top 10 on the chart. The film was shown at the Mill Valley Film Festival in October 1998.

== Reception ==
The film opened in the UK to negative reviews from various critics, some of whom lauded its technical milestone, but almost all of whom were critical of its script and Hoskins' direction. In his one-star review of the film for the Daily Mirror, Simon Rose remarked that "despite improvements in the technology, Rainbow has the look and feel of naff American kids' TV. It feels as if a five-minute segment on Sesame Street had been stretched to 100 minutes." Derek Malcolm of The Guardian said that "this cautionary ecological tale, which suggests that tampering with nature has penalties, includes some decent playing and a warmly human tone, but only the most cursory of special effects and very little dramatic drive." Ryan Gilbey of The Independent said that "as entertainment or education, it's unforgivably inept and should be used only in the event of Muppet Treasure Island being sold out. And there being nothing on TV. And no more relatives to visit." Alexander Walker of the London Evening Standard said that "the humour is laboured, the pace woefully inconsistent (it veers from magic realism through clubfooted farce to kiddie noir) and the tone so uncertain that belief remains less suspended than hung, drawn and quartered". Quentin Curtis of The Daily Telegraph said that the film "has a warm heart, but little else, despite enthusiastic cameos from Dan Aykroyd and Saul Rubinek." Quentin Falk of the Sunday Mirror, one of a number of critics to reference Hoskins' then-recurring role as spokesman for British Telecom, said that the actor "keeps telling us it's good to talk, but we could do without his lecture on the state of the environment in the well-meaning but dire family thriller Rainbow, which he co-stars in and directs." Graham Young of the Birmingham Evening Mail mentioned the technical milestone, and said that "if this saturated-video style technique takes off—and it's backers believe it could have halved the special effects costs of Jurassic Park—Rainbow will at least have one claim to fame even if, for the most part, its worthy ecological message falls short of delivering an exciting adventure." Mike Davies of The Birmingham Post wrote that "the leaden manner in which Hoskins chooses to have his young stars do this is one singularly lacking in pace, humour (unless you count Dan Aykroyd's numbskull sheriff falling down a lot), or anything resembling fun or excitement. Even the much vaunted colour saturation ride inside the rainbow is so much blurry dreariness. There's no pot of gold at the end of this rainbow; just a crock of something else entirety. Only take your kids if you want to put them off movies for life." Kevin Bourke of the Manchester Evening News wrote that "the mixture of some rather fey effects with some surprisingly strong and almost disturbing scenes of the world going mad doesn't really work and Rainbow is not a film that's going to seize too many people's imaginations." Michael Wood of the Coventry Evening Telegraph wrote that "this ecological, cautionary tale for kids doesn't live up to the state-of-the-art special effects technology it uses." A short capsule review from the Daily Star read: "Right at the beginning, a wise man shouts: 'Hey put that man out!' Sadly, no one takes a blind bit of notice — leaving Bob to Carry On Boring. Hoskins must have had his lines badly crossed when he quit his steady job as BT's salesman to star in and direct this early-for-Christmas turkey. [...] If your kids need to be punished, send them to see it."

Philip Kemp's review in Sight & Sound, August 1996, commented that "the story is put across with energy and imagination" and pointed out that the scenes where "colour drains away and society starts tearing itself apart… are genuinely disturbing [with] effective use of transitions between colour and monochrome." Kemp further reflected that the "chief credit for the clarity and richness of the images should go to veteran cinematographer Freddie Francis, whose experience of colour/monochrome effects goes back 40 years to his work with Oswald Morris on John Huston's Moby Dick." In an edition of The Times, Geoff Brown also complimented Francis' photography, saying that "Hopkins may not get the film's pacing right, but he knows enough to hire a distinguished visual photographer to deliver the necessary visual tricks."

According to Halliwell's Film Guide, Rainbow was a "heavy-handed, didactic children's film that strives for a fairy-tale quality, but too frequently falls flat."

On the review aggregator website Rotten Tomatoes, 13% of 8 critics' reviews are positive, with an average rating of 2.5/10.
