= The Game of the Century (TV series) =

- Genre: Documentary
- Written by: Robert Sidaway
- Directed by: Derek Conrad
- Country of origin: United Kingdom
- Original language: English
- No. of seasons: 1
- No. of episodes: 6

Production
- Producer: Robert Sidaway
- Cinematography: Harvey Harrison
- Running time: 30 minutes
- Production company: Conrad Film Associates / Polytel Film

Original release
- Network: BBC1
- Release: 23 April – 28 May 1978

The Game of the Century is a British television documentary series produced by Robert Sidaway and made as an independent production in association with the BBC, which provided use of its football library.

The six-part series was a preview of the 1978 FIFA World Cup with a look back at some of the great players and top matches of previous tournaments.

The series debuted on BBC One on 23 April 1978. The remainder of the series was shown on consecutive Sundays with the final episode broadcast on 28 May 1978.

A book to accompany the series was written by Robert Sidaway and Bob Wilson and published by Fontana on 17 April 1978.

Argentina Heroes (We're On Our Way), the theme song from the series, was released by Pye Records on 28 April 1978. The song was performed by Moon Williams, produced by Paul Rade and written by Reade / Marshall. On the B side of the single was So Good So Far, another song featured in the series.

== Episodes ==
1. THE SUPERSTARS

Initial Broadcast Date: 23 April 1978

A tribute to some of the great names of the game - George Best, Franz Beckenbauer, Johan Cruyff and Pelé - how they became stars and what they achieved. In addition, action features new names, like Brazil's Zico, who were looking to become the superstars of the 1978 FIFA World Cup Finals in Argentina.

2. THE MEN YOU LOVE TO HATE

Initial Broadcast Date: 30 April 1978

Much of the responsibility for a trouble-free World Cup rests with the referees. This program features two of the world's best - Arnaldo Cézar Coelho of Brazil and Clive Thomas of Wales - as well as Sir Stanley Rous who perfected the modern system of refereeing.

3. WINNERS AND LOSERS

Initial Broadcast Date: 7 May 1978

The third program traces the growth of international soccer from the earliest match to the 1974 FIFA World Cup final in Germany, and includes action from every World Cup tournament.

4. FROM TAMPA BAY TO TIMBUKTU

Initial Broadcast Date: 14 May 1978

Part 4 concentrates on the new soccer nations, including Iran, who made their debut in the 1978 FIFA World Cup Finals in the same group as Scotland. But nowhere was the game growing faster than in the United States, whose clubs were spending vast sums in recruiting some of the best players in the world and aiming to be World Cup finalists in the 1980s.

5. THE SWEAT MERCHANTS

Initial Broadcast Date: 21 May 1978

What does it take to be a World Cup manager? How do men cope with the pressures of winning and losing? Part 5 features the men in the hot seat: Helmut Schoen of West Germany, Claudio Coutinho of Brazil, Cesar Luis Menotti of Argentina, and Ally MacLeod of Scotland, all determined that their teams will finish among the medals.

6. THE CIRCUS COMES TO TOWN

Initial Broadcast Date: 28 May 1978

Broadcast four days before the beginning of 1978 FIFA World Cup, the last in the series looks at preparations for the Finals themselves and the goals which took the 16 countries to Argentina.
