= One Man and His Bog =

Book by Barry Pilton

- First edition
- Author: Barry Pilton
- Illustrator: Gray Jolliffe
- Language: English
- Genre: travel
- Publisher: Corgi
- Publication date: 1986
- Publication place: United Kingdom
- Media type: Print
- Pages: 144
- ISBN: 0-552-12796-5

One Man and His Bog (subtitled: The Reluctant Rambler's Guide to Walking the Pennine Way) is a 1986 travelogue book written by Barry Pilton and published by Corgi which started life as a series of talks on BBC Radio 4. It gives a light-hearted account of his walking the full length of the Pennine Way in 21 days, from Edale in Derbyshire to Kirk Yetholm in the Scottish Borders. The book has a foreword by Mike Harding and illustrations by Gray Jolliffe.

The book opens with an author's note: "If this book should in some small way encourage people to take up walking themselves, then the author suggests they read the book again more carefully".

It includes humorous tales of the people he met on the route, his overnight stops primarily at Youth Hostels, and the toll it took on his body. A glossary of "Difficult Technical Terms" is also included, for example "Compass – instrument for establishing you are lost".

The book's title refers to that of the well-known television series One Man and His Dog, which features sheepdog trials, often in the Pennines and other upland areas.

== One Man and His Log ==
In 1988 Barry Pilton wrote a follow-up book, One Man and His Log (subtitled The Cautionary and True Tale of Five Buffoons and a Barge) also illustrated by Gray Jolliffe, recounting a journey along the Canal du Nivernais from Corbigny to Clamecy in central France.
