= Wicked Willie =

Humorous British cartoon character

Wicked Willie Reloaded book cover featuring the eponymous Wicked Willie

Wicked Willie is a humorous British cartoon character personified as a talking penis, created by Gray Jolliffe (illustrator) and Peter Mayle (writer). He first appeared in the book Man's Best Friend, published in 1984. He has subsequently appeared in Wicked Willie – The Movie, and the board game, The Wicked Willie Game. Jolliffe has said that the idea for Wicked Willie came to him one day, while he was in the bath. A more detailed history of Wicked Willie is found in the book Wicked Willie Reloaded.

Journalist Peter Silverton described it thus: "...comic books about a man and his Wicked Willie. It was a dialogue—mostly about women, of course—between the two. Its irony is that the 'dreadful little trouser mole' is by far the sharper of the two brains".

== Personification ==
Author Peter Mayle describes Wicked Willie as "a rampant penis". In her book Communicating Gender, Suzanne Romaine notes:

"The personification metaphor suggests that the penis leads a life of its own. It has been popularized in Britain in the form of the Wicked Willie books, where Willie is referred to as "Man's Best Friend".

Scottish feminist linguist Deborah Cameron notes that:

"In England, there is a popular cartoon character called "Wicked Willie" [...] The underlying conceit is that men secretly regard their penis as an individual in its own right (and one to whom they are deeply attached). Though the cartoon is a joke, it presumably speaks to a widely recognized, culturally constructed experience of the penis as an uncontrollable Other, with a life of its own".

The character also contributed to the permissiveness and acceptance of sex on the high street. British journalist Libby Purves writes:

"High street shops no longer bother to put their hopping penises on a high shelf, and nor do bookshops selling Wicked Willie and the like."

== Reception ==
In March 1987, the book Wicked Willie's Guide to Women was in the number seven position in the paperback nonfiction section of the month's bestsellers. Almost a year later, Wicked Willie's Low-down on Men had reached number 6 in the same chart.

== Bibliography ==
- Man's Best Friend: Introducing Wicked Willie in the Title Role, illustrated by Gray Jolliffe, Crown (New York, NY), 1984.
- Wicked Willie's Guide to Women: A Worm's-Eye View of the Fair Sex, illustrated by Gray Jolliffe, Pan Books (London, England), 1986, Crown (New York, NY), 1987.
- Wicked Willie's Low-down on Men by Peter Mayle, Gray Jolliff, ISBN 0-330-30137-3, ISBN 978-0330301374. 64 pages. 1987
- Wicked Willie's Guide to Women: The Further Adventures of Man's Best Friend, illustrated by Gray Jolliffe, Crown (New York, NY), 1988.
- The World According to Wicked Willie by Peter Mayle, Gray Jolliffe, ISBN 0-330-30536-0, ISBN 978-0330305365. 64 pages (1988)
- Wicked Willie Stand Up Comic Book, by Peter Mayle, Gray Jolliffe and Peter May (Hardcover - Aug 1990), ISBN 0-330-31629-X ISBN 978-0330316293, 16 pages
- Wicked Willie Does Stand Up, by Gray Jolliffe, ISBN 1-85479-859-6 ISBN 978-1854798596 (30 Aug 2002), 7 pages
- Wicked Willie: Reloaded, by Gray Joliffe, publisher: Prion Books Ltd, Sept 2004, ISBN 1-85375-541-9, ISBN 978-1853755415. 64 pages.

=== DVDs ===
- Wicked Willie – The Movie & Comes again... and again – The Complete Wicked Willie [2010], Bob Godfrey (director). 83 minutes
