= Steven Robiner =

American visual effects supervisor

Steven Robiner is an American visual effects supervisor.

== Biography ==
Robiner earned an MFA from the University of Southern California. He then supervised and co-produced the first ever digital visual effects motion picture created featuring the Marvel comic book super-hero Silver Surfer during his post graduate tenure at USC. After high acclaim and awards for that short, Robiner was quickly scooped up by the Hollywood feature film world where he quickly rose to prominence as a supervisor in the new digital medium of High Definition. He was an above-the-line credited visual effects supervisor for the first-ever all digital motion picture Rainbow in 1996 starring Dan Aykroyd and Bob Hoskins, followed by The Long Kiss Goodnight starring Geena Davis, and several other feature films, including one starring Scarlett Johansson in her first adult role.

After serving for over five years as the Senior Visual Effects Supervisor at the Sony Pictures High Definition Center, Robiner moved on to producing and supervising independent projects, such as the multiple award-winning comedy Damned If You Do starring David Alan Grier. After 17 years, and numerous awards in the film industry, Steven Robiner chose to focus on painting, photography, mixed-media artwork and other literary projects culminating in an online collective of award-winning pieces. By 2006, he had amassed a significant track record as an award-winning new artist, with multiple juried and invitational gallery shows to his credit.

== Notes ==
http://Robiner.com http://naturascapes.com
