= The Valley (novel) =

2005 novel by Barry Pilton

- First edition
- Author: Barry Pilton
- Language: English
- Genre: Comedy
- Publisher: Bloomsbury
- Publication date: 2005
- Publication place: United Kingdom
- Media type: Print
- Pages: 288
- ISBN: 0-7475-7168-6
- Followed by: Town with No Twin

The Valley is the first novel by Barry Pilton, published in 2005 by Bloomsbury. It is a humorous account of the effect of outsiders on the rural status quo in a fictional mid-Wales valley during the 1980s and is being adapted for television.

== Plot introduction ==
Those living in the insular Nant Valley believe they are immune to the changes going on in the outside world. However, outsiders have discovered the rural idyll and are moving in to enjoy its benefits. Dafydd, the ubiquitous postman, is uncertain the Valley is ready for newcomers. The mysterious Stefan buys a derelict manor house and tries to become a squire - but finds his money impresses no-one and can't even get a drink in the pub as Gwillim the landlord hates all customers. Jane and Rob, artistic but impoverished urbanites, want to live The Good Life, but their passion for alfresco nudity has tragic repercussions for the farming community. Gradually the fabric of rural life comes undone as local and outsider collide with dramatic results.

== Sequels ==
Two sequels have been written continuing the story of the characters introduced in The Valley:

- Town with No Twin (2007) ISBN 0-7475-8956-9
- Land of My Neighbours (2009) ISBN 1-4088-0272-4
