= Gray Jolliffe =

British illustrator and cartoonist

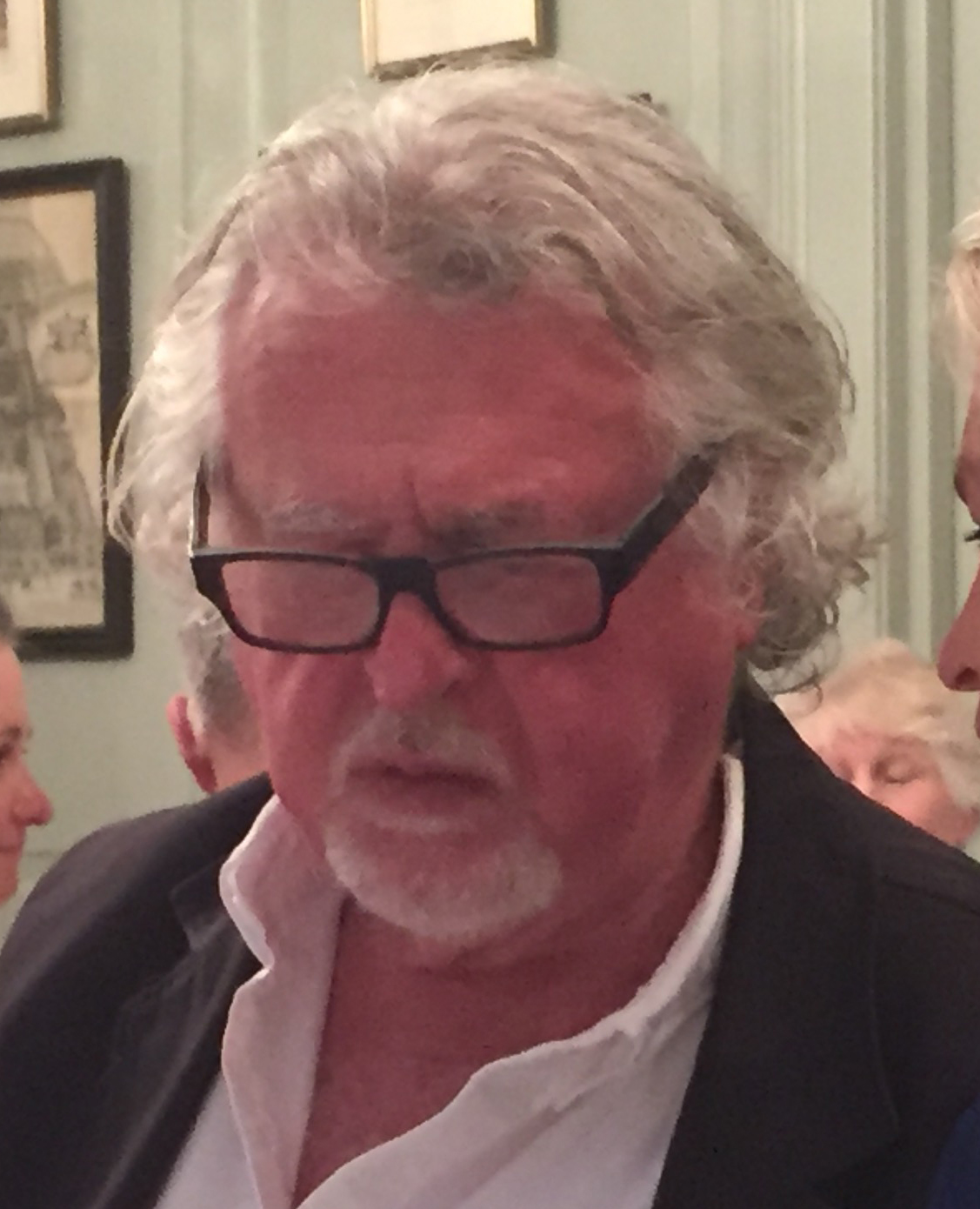
Gray Jolliffe, British Cartoonist

Graham Jolliffe (born 1937, St Germans, Cornwall, UK) is a British illustrator and cartoonist. His work includes Chloe & Co in the Daily Mail, and the Wicked Willie character that first appeared in the book, Man's Best Friend in 1984. He uses ink, and colours his work using the TRIA marker system from Letraset.

== Early life ==
He attended The King's School, Peterborough, where R.K. Jolliffe was later Head Boy.

== Career ==
Jolliffe started as an advertising copywriter with Maxwell Clarke on Fleet Street but then became a cartoonist and illustrator; for example illustrating One Man and His Bog by Barry Pilton in 1986. He became Cartoonist of the Year in 1997 and has worked for the Boase Massimi Pollitt (BMP) agency.

He illustrated Sir Terry Pratchett's The Unadulterated Cat in 1989

He wrote the Wicked Willie books with Peter Mayle.

He illustrated the Easy Peasy People series with the late Roger Hargreaves.

Through the 1980's he had a strip cartoon on the inside back cover of Creative Review magazine titled variously The Krative Jungle and The Crative Jungle.
