= Cult-tastic: Tales from the Trenches with Roger and Julie Corman =

Documentary series

Cult-tastic: Tales from the Trenches with Roger and Julie Corman is a documentary series looking at the films of Roger Corman and Julie Corman.

Created, written and co-produced by Robert Sidaway and Ashley Sidaway, it was filmed over a four month period in Los Angeles, California during 2018.

The series comprises thirteen 50-minute episodes and features over 130 films, including Rock 'n' Roll High School, The Trip, The Wild Angels, Death Race 2000, Piranha, Bloodfist, Black Scorpion, Little Shop of Horrors, Eat My Dust! and Humanoids from the Deep.

The series is produced by Shout! Studios (the production arm of Shout! Factory) and Ace Film HK in association with Friendship Films.
