= The Unadulterated Cat =

Book by Terry Pratchett

- First edition
- Author: Terry Pratchett
- Illustrator: Gray Jolliffe
- Language: English
- Subject: Cat behavior
- Genre: Humour
- Publisher: Gollancz (1989, 1992); Orion (2002)
- Publication place: United Kingdom
- Media type: Hardcover and paperback
- Pages: 160
- ISBN: 978-0-7528-5369-7

The Unadulterated Cat by Terry Pratchett, illustrated by Gray Jolliffe, is a book written to promote what Pratchett terms the 'Real Cat', a cat who urinates in the flowerbeds, rips up the furniture, and eats frogs, mice and sundry other small animals. The opposite of the Real Cat is the 'Fizzy Keg Cat', a well-behaved and bland kind, as seen on cat food advertisements. It was first published 1989 by Gollancz.

== Translations ==
- Автентичната котка (Bulgarian)
- Nefalšovaná kočka (Czech)
- De echte kat (Dutch)
- Tosikissa ei kirppuja kiroile (Finnish)
- Sacrés chats ! (French)
- Die gemeine Hauskatze (German)
- Az igazi macska: Kampány az igazi macskáért (Hungarian)
- Il Gatto D.O.C. (Italian)
- Kot w stanie czystym (Polish)
- Кот без дураков (Russian)
- Riktiga Katter bär inte Rosett (Swedish)
- Справжнісінький кіт (Ukrainian)
