= Into the Rainbow =

- Teaser poster
- Chinese: 奇迹：追逐彩虹
- Directed by: Norman Stone; Gary Mak
- Written by: Ashley Sidaway; Robert Sidaway; Lindsay Edmonds
- Produced by: Iain Brown; Richard Fletcher; Emma Slade; Zhou Difei
- Starring: Willow Shields; Maria Grazia Cucinotta
- Cinematography: Richard Bluck
- Edited by: Peter Roberts
- Music by: Tom McLeod
- Production companies: Beijing Tianrun Media; Libertine Pictures; TW Films
- Distributed by: Stellar Mega Films (China); Rialto Distribution (New Zealand)
- Release dates: 8 April 2017 (TIFF Kids); 1 November 2017 (Canada)
- Running time: 88 minutes
- Countries: China; New Zealand
- Language: English
- Budget: US$20 million

Into the Rainbow (titled: 奇迹：追逐彩虹; The Wonder: Chasing Rainbows) is a 2017 fantasy adventure film directed by Norman Stone, co-directed by Gary Wing-Lun Mak, and written by Ashley Sidaway and Robert Sidaway. The film stars Willow Shields, Leo Wu, Maria Grazia Cucinotta, Joe Chen, Jacqueline Joe, Archie Kao and Christy Chung. The film is a co-production between China and New Zealand. The film was shot in 3D.

== Plot ==
Two troubled teenage girls, Rachel and Grace, discover an incredible natural phenomenon and find themselves transported inside a super-powered rainbow to China. Due to this, they disturbed nature's balance and are chased down by an obsessed scientist and her mysterious international organisation. Using Rachel's connection to the energy of the rainbow and with help from their new friend Xiao Cheng, they must race against time to restore nature's balance before catastrophic storms destroy the entire Pacific and threaten the world.

== Cast ==
- Willow Shields as Rachel
- Maria Grazia Cucinotta as Julia Bianchi
- Leo Wu as Xiao Cheng
- Jacqueline Joe as Grace
- Joe Chen as Lian
- Archie Kao as Song
- Christy Chung as Mei
- Emmett Skilton as Tom Williams
- Tania Nolan as Lindsay
- Bruce Hopkins as Major
- Chelsie Preston Crayford as Susan
- Peter Feeney as Scientist
- Colin Moy as Ben
- Tessa Rao as Koia
- Sophie McIntosh as Koia's girl
- Sylvia Rands as Gini
- Talia Pua as Sea Shore customer
- Scarlett Sills as young Rachel

== Production ==
The film was shot in Qingdao, China and Auckland, New Zealand.

== Release ==
The film was shown at the TIFF Kids International Film Festival during April 2017.

The film received its United States. Premiere with a Gala Screening at the Savannah Film Festival on 4 November 2017. and was Opening Night film of the Asia Pacific Film Festival in Auckland on 28 October 2017.

After a limited theatrical release in China during April 2019, the film was scheduled for a nationwide release on January 25, 2020, during the Chinese New Year holidays. Due to the coronavirus outbreak, the release was delayed and the film made available through the Smart Cinema online app. It was subsequently announced that the film's theatrical release in China was scheduled for April 5, 2020.

== Novel ==
A novel titled The Wonder, Into The Rainbow was written by Robert Sidaway and Ashley Sidaway based on the story and screenplay. The book includes a foreword written by Willow Shields. It was first published by Steam Press, part of the Eunoia Publishing Group, in October 2017. In 2019 it was made available as an ebook in both English and Simplified Chinese.
