= When Time Got Louder =

2022 Canadian film directed by Connie Cocchia

- Film poster
- Directed by: Connie Cocchia
- Written by: Connie Cocchia
- Produced by: Jason Bourque; Connie Cocchia; Ken Frith
- Starring: Willow Shields; Lochlyn Munro; Elizabeth Mitchell
- Cinematography: Graham Talbot; Nelson Talbot
- Edited by: Asim Nuraney
- Music by: Chris Hyson
- Production companies: Cocchia Productions; Gold Star Productions
- Distributed by: Levelfilm
- Release date: June 22, 2022 (Frameline)
- Running time: 114 minutes
- Country: Canada
- Language: English

When Time Got Louder is a 2022 Canadian coming-of-age drama film, written, produced, and directed by Connie Cocchia. The film stars Willow Shields as Abbie, a young woman who experiences independence for the first time when she goes off to college and begins a new romance with Karly (Ava Capri), while still being torn by the need to help her parents, Mark (Lochlyn Munro) and Tish (Elizabeth Mitchell), care for her autistic brother Kayden (Jonathan Michael Simao).

The film debuted at the 2022 Frameline Film Festival, and had its Canadian premiere at the 2022 Vancouver International Film Festival.

When Time Got Louder was nominated for 10 Leo Awards (2023), screened at over 40 film festivals in 4 continents and Cocchia’s work for the film and her charity Growing Together were recognized as a recipient of the BC Community Achievement Award.
