= Best of British (TV series) =

- Company logo used on series
- Genre: Documentary
- Created by: Robert Sidaway; Ashley Sidaway; Maurice Sellar; Lou Jones
- Written by: Robert Sidaway; Ashley Sidaway; Maurice Sellar; Lou Jones
- Narrated by: John Mills; Anthony Quayle
- Theme music composer: Rob Waugh
- Country of origin: United Kingdom
- Original language: English
- No. of seasons: 5
- No. of episodes: 67

Production
- Producer: Robert Sidaway
- Running time: 25 minutes
- Production companies: Best of British Films & Television

Original release
- Network: BBC1
- Release: 22 April 1987 – 31 March 1994

Best of British is a British television documentary series, created by Robert Sidaway, Ashley Sidaway, Maurice Sellar and Lou Jones and produced by Robert Sidaway.

Narrated by John Mills and Anthony Quayle, the series comprised five seasons and sixty seven episodes all originally broadcast on BBC1.

Designed as entertainment for a broad audience, the complete series encompasses a comprehensive view of British cinema from the 1930s to the 1980s by examining a different theme and or genre in each episode through the extensive use of film clips.

The series debuted on 22 April 1987. The final episode was broadcast on 31 March 1994.

The UK company Best Of British Films & Television was established due to the success of the series.

== Production ==
=== Season 1 ===
The creators had worked together in 1985 on the one hour documentary special Around The World In Seven Minutes and Four Times On Saturday, about the Pathé News and Movietone News cinema newsreels and their lead commentators Bob Danvers-Walker and Leslie Mitchell. The successful relationship established with Barry Brown (at the time Head of Acquisitions at the BBC) led to the pre-purchase of Season One, which was then made independently by Charisma Films.

Produced during 1986, Season One comprised ten episodes and featured films produced and distributed by the Rank Organisation over a fifty-year period from the 1930s to the 1980s. Produced by Robert Sidaway for Best of British Films & Television and Charisma Films, all the programs were written by Robert Sidaway, Ashley Sidaway, Maurice Sellar and Lou Jones and narrated by John Mills.

Commencing Wednesday 22 April 1987, the episodes were broadcast on a weekly basis at 7:35 pm. Each episode was 25 minutes in length, apart from Things That Go Bump in the Night (Episode 1.07) which was edited down to 19 minutes by the BBC due to the intense nature of the content for the early evening timeslot.

=== Book ===
A book based on Season One and titled The Best of British: A Celebration of Rank Film Classics was written by Robert Sidaway, Ashley Sidaway, Maurice Sellar and Lou Jones and published by Sphere Books in April 1987 to coincide with the broadcast of the series.

=== Wogan specials ===
Two specials of the television chat show Wogan were hosted by Terry Wogan to tie-in with the series and featured a number of British cinema stars, including John Mills, Stewart Granger, Peter Cushing, Kenneth Williams and Norman Wisdom. The first special was broadcast on Friday 22 May 1987 (duration 35 minutes) and the second special on Monday 25 May 1987 (duration 40 minutes).

=== Season 2 ===
Season Two comprised sixteen episodes and continued the detailed look at films produced and distributed by the Rank Organisation. Produced by Robert Sidaway for Best of British Films & Television and Charisma Films, all the programs were written by Robert Sidaway, Ashley Sidaway, Maurice Sellar and Lou Jones and narrated by John Mills.

Production took place during late 1987 and 1988. During production of Season Two, the series theme music was recorded by the National Philharmonic Orchestra. Nicholas Raine arranged and conducted the sessions at CTS Studios in Wembley. The music was released by RCA in June 1987 with a Love Theme arrangement on the A side and the Main Theme on the B side. The orchestral version of the music was used on Seasons Two to Five.

The first five episodes were initially broadcast commencing on 10 August 1988.

== Episodes ==
=== Season 1 ===
No.	Title	Narrator	Written by	Original release date
1.01	"The Heroes"	John Mills	Robert Sidaway, Ashley Sidaway, Maurice Sellar and Lou Jones	22 April 1987
From Tom Brown to Bulldog Drummond, from Biggles to Bond, the 20th Century British hero was represented as schoolboy, sleuth, soldier, sailor, sky-pilot and spy, and film portrayed them in all their different personalities – romantic, gritty, superior, gutsy, charming, and even with a tongue-in-cheek humour. Featured stars include Dirk Bogarde, Jack Hawkins, Stewart Granger, Kenneth More, Leslie Howard, David Niven and John Mills in films such as Reach for the Sky, We Dive at Dawn, A Tale of Two Cities and A Matter of Life and Death.
1.02	"Leave 'Em Laughing"	John Mills	Robert Sidaway, Ashley Sidaway, Maurice Sellar and Lou Jones	29 April 1987
Some of British cinema's most famous comedians are featured in classic scenes from several of their best known movies. Stars included Norman Wisdom, Stanley Holloway, Will Hay, Arthur Askey, Frankie Howerd and the Carry On team in films such as On the Beat, Oh, Mr Porter!, The Ghost Train and Carry On Doctor.
1.03	"I Spy"	John Mills	Robert Sidaway, Ashley Sidaway, Maurice Sellar and Lou Jones	6 May 1987
A look at British spy stories, ranging from classic Alfred Hitchcock thrillers of the 1930s to eighties paranoia in Defence of the Realm a mixture of the commonplace with the extraordinary - the ease with which laughs turn into thrills, the way a coded secret can suddenly mean life or death for a group of innocent people. Featured stars include Robert Donat, Kenneth More, Deborah Kerr and Margaret Lockwood in films such as Sabotage, the original 1938 version of The Lady Vanishes as well as the 1979 remake The Lady Vanishes and all three film adaptations of John Buchan's The Thirty-Nine Steps, The 39 Steps, The 39 Steps and The Thirty Nine Steps.
1.04	"The English Roses"	John Mills	Robert Sidaway, Ashley Sidaway, Maurice Sellar and Lou Jones	13 May 1987
During the 1940s and 50s, British films featured a number of female stars who portrayed fiery, independent characters in distinctive settings and stories than emanated from the events of World War II and the cultural aftermath. Featured stars Phyllis Calvert, Patricia Roc, Margaret Lockwood, Virginia McKenna, Deborah Kerr and Jean Simmons in films such as Madonna of the Seven Moons, Love Story (1944 film), The Wicked Lady, A Town Like Alice, Black Narcissus and The Blue Lagoon.
1.05	"The All-Singing, All-Dancing Show"	John Mills	Robert Sidaway, Ashley Sidaway, Maurice Sellar and Lou Jones	20 May 1987
Elaborate musical sequences from the golden age of British musicals highlight the talents of stars such as Jessie Matthews, Jack Buchanan, Jean Kent and Kay Kendall in such films as Evergreen, As Long As They're Happy, Trottie True and London Town.
1.06	"The War Game"	John Mills	Robert Sidaway, Ashley Sidaway, Maurice Sellar and Lou Jones	27 May 1987
Some of British cinema's best and most enduring films have centered on stories and themes from wartime. This episode included stars like David Niven, Noël Coward, Trevor Howard and John Mills in classics such as A Matter of Life and Death, In Which We Serve, The Way Ahead, The Life and Death of Colonel Blimp, The Way to the Stars, Reach for the Sky, 49th Parallel, Henry V.
1.07	"Things That Go Bump in the Night"	John Mills	Robert Sidaway, Ashley Sidaway, Maurice Sellar and Lou Jones	3 June 1987
Ghosts and ghouls have been a dominant and popular genre from the beginnings of British cinema, whether treated for thrills or comedy. This episodes included films like A Place of One's Own, Blithe Spirit, Don't Take It to Heart and The Clairvoyant and stars such as James Mason, Margaret Rutherford, Richard Greene and Claude Rains.
1.08	"Fine And Dandy"	John Mills	Robert Sidaway, Ashley Sidaway, Maurice Sellar and Lou Jones	10 June 1987
Costume dramas have been a staple of British cinema, especially during the 1940s when the Gainsborough melodramas resulted in some of the successful and popular films of the period. This episode looked at some of the best examples of the genre, mixing sumptuous film-making artistry with propulsive narratives. Stars included James Mason, Margaret Lockwood, Phyllis Calvert, Patricia Roc, Stewart Granger, Dennis Price, Jean Kent and Dulcie Gray in films such as The Wicked Lady, The Man in Grey, Fanny by Gaslight, Madonna of the Seven Moons and The Magic Bow.
1.09	"The Eccentrics"	John Mills	Robert Sidaway, Ashley Sidaway, Maurice Sellar and Lou Jones	17 June 1987
The combination of distinctive actors and characters have produced some of the most indelible and memorable scenes in British cinema. This episode features some of the true originals of British cinema including Margaret Rutherford, Peter Sellers, Alastair Sim and Edith Evans in films such as Blithe Spirit, Waltz of the Toreadors, Cottage to Let and The Importance of Being Earnest.
1.10	"Power And Prejudice"	John Mills	Robert Sidaway, Ashley Sidaway, Maurice Sellar and Lou Jones	24 June 1987
British cinema has always has a strong tradition for powerful reflections on contemporary life, social and psychological dramas that mix insightful commentary and identifiable characters with involving narratives. Featured stars include Richard Harris, Patricia Roc, Stanley Baker and James Mason in films such as This Sporting Life, When the Bough Breaks, Violent Playground and Odd Man Out.

=== Season 2 ===
No.	Title	Narrator	Written by	Original release date
2.01	"Classic Tales"	John Mills	Robert Sidaway, Ashley Sidaway, Maurice Sellar and Lou Jones	10 August 1988
Highlights from some of the best-known literary adaptations British cinema has produced, including The Importance of Being Earnest, Oliver Twist, Great Expectations, The Card and The History of Mr. Polly.
2.02	"Action Men"	John Mills	Robert Sidaway, Ashley Sidaway, Maurice Sellar and Lou Jones	19 August 1988
Stars such as Oliver Reed, Stanley Baker, Howard Keel and Peter Finch feature in films highlighting thrills and action, including Hell Drivers, The Trap, Sea Fury, Floods of Fear and Robbery Under Arms .
2.03	"All in the Game"	John Mills	Robert Sidaway, Ashley Sidaway, Maurice Sellar and Lou Jones	2 September 1988
A look at the combination of stars and sporting themes that have produced winning cinema, including Richard Harris as a rugby player in This Sporting Life, Stanley Baker in the driving seat in Checkpoint, ski-chump David Tomlinson in All for Mary and Basil Radford and Naunton Wayne as obsessive cricket fans in The Lady Vanishes.
2.04	"Kids"	John Mills	Robert Sidaway, Ashley Sidaway, Maurice Sellar and Lou Jones	7 September 1988
Celebrating young scene stealers including John Howard Davies, Jon Whiteley, Vincent Waters, Hayley Mills and Juliet Mills in British movies such as Oliver Twist, Dangerous Exile, The Kidnappers, Tiger Bay and The History of Mr Polly.
2.05	"Film Fun"	John Mills	Robert Sidaway, Ashley Sidaway, Maurice Sellar and Lou Jones	14 September 1988
Comedy sequences from films such as The Early Bird, The Frozen Limits, The Intelligence Men, Band Waggon and Carry On Loving feature stars like Norman Wisdom, the Crazy Gang, Morecambe and Wise, Arthur Askey and the Carry On team.

The remaining eleven episodes were broadcast between 11 January 1989 and 22 March 1989.

No.	Title	Narrator	Written by	Original release date
2.06	"Animal Antics"	John Mills	Robert Sidaway, Ashley Sidaway, Maurice Sellar and Lou Jones	11 January 1989
2.07	"Love Story"	John Mills	Robert Sidaway, Ashley Sidaway, Maurice Sellar and Lou Jones	18 January 1989
2.08	"All at Sea"	John Mills	Robert Sidaway, Ashley Sidaway, Maurice Sellar and Lou Jones	25 January 1989
2.09	"Doctors And Nurses"	John Mills	Robert Sidaway, Ashley Sidaway, Maurice Sellar and Lou Jones	1 February 1989
2.10	"Heaven And Earth"	John Mills	Robert Sidaway, Ashley Sidaway, Maurice Sellar and Lou Jones	8 February 1989
2.11	"New Frontiers"	John Mills	Robert Sidaway, Ashley Sidaway, Maurice Sellar and Lou Jones	15 February 1989
2.12	"Woman's Own"	John Mills	Robert Sidaway, Ashley Sidaway, Maurice Sellar and Lou Jones	22 February 1989
2.13	"English Gentlemen"	John Mills	Robert Sidaway, Ashley Sidaway, Maurice Sellar and Lou Jones	1 March 1989
2.14	"Reel Lives"	John Mills	Robert Sidaway, Ashley Sidaway, Maurice Sellar and Lou Jones	8 March 1989
2.15	"Going Places"	John Mills	Robert Sidaway, Ashley Sidaway, Maurice Sellar and Lou Jones	15 March 1989
2.16	"Gotta Sing, Gotta Dance"	John Mills	Robert Sidaway, Ashley Sidaway, Maurice Sellar and Lou Jones	22 March 1989

=== Season 3 ===
No.	Title	Narrator	Written by	Original release date
3.01	"Star"	Anthony Quayle	Robert Sidaway, Ashley Sidaway, Maurice Sellar and Lou Jones	19 March 1990
Audiences have always taken to their hearts favourite performers whose appeal transcends international barriers. Featured are such names as Michael Caine, Henry Fonda and Meryl Streep in films including The Eagle Has Landed, On Golden Pond and Sophie's Choice.
3.02	"Bonds of Love"	Anthony Quayle	Robert Sidaway, Ashley Sidaway, Maurice Sellar and Lou Jones	26 March 1990
A look at the portrayal of relationships between friends, lovers and families in films such as Brief Encounter, On Golden Pond and Voyage of the Damned.
3.03	"Against All Odds"	Anthony Quayle	Robert Sidaway, Ashley Sidaway, Maurice Sellar and Lou Jones	2 April 1990
The thrill and excitement of action movies highlighted by films such as Raise the Titanic, Hawk The Slayer and Escape to Athena with stars including Michael Caine, Gene Hackman and Elliot Gould.
3.04	"Best Sellers"	Anthony Quayle	Robert Sidaway, Ashley Sidaway, Maurice Sellar and Lou Jones	9 April 1990
From the Bible to Charles Dickens and Alexander Dumas, literature has been a rich source of cinematic entertainment. Featured productions include Great Expectations, The Man In The Iron Mask and Moses The Lawgiver, with stars such as Burt Lancaster and Richard Chamberlain.
3.05	"Crimetime"	Anthony Quayle	Robert Sidaway, Ashley Sidaway, Maurice Sellar and Lou Jones	23 April 1990
A look at films showing the profits of crime and the wages of sin, including Return Of The Pink Panther, Love And Bullets and Madam Sin with stars like Peter Sellers, Charles Bronson and Bette Davis.
3.06	"The Detectives"	Anthony Quayle	Robert Sidaway, Ashley Sidaway, Maurice Sellar and Lou Jones	30 April 1990
The downbeat doggedness of Philip Marlowe, the suave charm of Simon Templar, the comic ineptitude of Inspector Clouseau. Films featured include Farewell My Lovely and Return Of The Pink Panther, with stars such as Robert Mitchum and Peter Sellers.
3.07	"The Way We Are"	Anthony Quayle	Robert Sidaway, Ashley Sidaway, Maurice Sellar and Lou Jones	14 May 1990
From the sun-kissed sidewalks of California to the dingy streets of London, filmmakers reflect on modern society in films such as From A Far Country and Rising Damp with stars such as Peter Fonda, Sam Neill and Leonard Rossiter.
3.08	"Just An Illusion"	Anthony Quayle	Robert Sidaway, Ashley Sidaway, Maurice Sellar and Lou Jones	21 May 1990
Highlighting the magic of special effects in films like Saturn 3. Raise the Titanic and Capricorn One with stars including Kirk Douglas, Omar Sharif and Telly Savalas.
3.09	"Strength Of Character"	Anthony Quayle	Robert Sidaway, Ashley Sidaway, Maurice Sellar and Lou Jones	4 June 1990
A look at the wide-ranging skills of actors including Laurence Olivier, Robert Duvall and James Stewart.
3.10	"The Dark Side"	Anthony Quayle	Robert Sidaway, Ashley Sidaway, Maurice Sellar and Lou Jones	30 October 1990
Moments from films that have explored the dark side of mystery and imagination, featuring Richard Burton, Kirk Douglas and Terence Stamp.

=== Season 4 ===
No.	Title	Narrator	Written by	Original release date
4.01	"A Class of Their Own"	John Mills	Robert Sidaway, Ashley Sidaway, Maurice Sellar and Lou Jones	24 September 1990
4.02	"The Gentle Touch"	John Mills	Robert Sidaway, Ashley Sidaway, Maurice Sellar and Lou Jones	25 September 1990
4.03	"Private Lives"	John Mills	Robert Sidaway, Ashley Sidaway, Maurice Sellar and Lou Jones	26 September 1990
4.04	"The Romantics"	John Mills	Robert Sidaway, Ashley Sidaway, Maurice Sellar and Lou Jones	27 September 1990
4.05	"World of Adventure"	John Mills	Robert Sidaway, Ashley Sidaway, Maurice Sellar and Lou Jones	28 September 1990

=== Season 5 ===
No.	Title	Narrator	Written by	Original release date
5.01	"Rock 'N' Roll"	John Mills	Robert Sidaway, Ashley Sidaway, Maurice Sellar and Lou Jones	1 June 1993
5.02	"Villain"	John Mills	Robert Sidaway, Ashley Sidaway, Maurice Sellar and Lou Jones	15 June 1993
5.03	"George and Gracie"	John Mills	Robert Sidaway, Ashley Sidaway, Maurice Sellar and Lou Jones	20 September 1993
5.04	"Independent Woman"	John Mills	Robert Sidaway, Ashley Sidaway, Maurice Sellar and Lou Jones	21 September 1993
5.05	"Who Dunnit"	John Mills	Robert Sidaway, Ashley Sidaway, Maurice Sellar and Lou Jones	22 September 1993
5.06	"Song And Dance"	John Mills	Robert Sidaway, Ashley Sidaway, Maurice Sellar and Lou Jones	23 September 1993
5.07	"Scales of Justice"	John Mills	Robert Sidaway, Ashley Sidaway, Maurice Sellar and Lou Jones	4 October 1993
5.08	"Classic Characters"	John Mills	Robert Sidaway, Ashley Sidaway, Maurice Sellar and Lou Jones	20 December 1993
5.09	"When We Were Young"	John Mills	Robert Sidaway, Ashley Sidaway, Maurice Sellar and Lou Jones	21 December 1993
5.10	"Home Sweet Home"	John Mills	Robert Sidaway, Ashley Sidaway, Maurice Sellar and Lou Jones	22 December 1993
5.11	"History in the Making"	John Mills	Robert Sidaway, Ashley Sidaway, Maurice Sellar and Lou Jones	23 December 1993
5.12	"Ealing Comedies"	John Mills	Robert Sidaway, Ashley Sidaway, Maurice Sellar and Lou Jones	24 December 1993
5.13	"Affairs of the Heart"	John Mills	Robert Sidaway, Ashley Sidaway, Maurice Sellar and Lou Jones	27 December 1993
5.14	"Cliffhanger"	John Mills	Robert Sidaway, Ashley Sidaway, Maurice Sellar and Lou Jones	28 December 1993
5.15	"Behind The Lines"	John Mills	Robert Sidaway, Ashley Sidaway, Maurice Sellar and Lou Jones	29 December 1993
5.16	"Money Matters"	John Mills	Robert Sidaway, Ashley Sidaway, Maurice Sellar and Lou Jones	30 December 1993
5.17	"Things To Come"	John Mills	Robert Sidaway, Ashley Sidaway, Maurice Sellar and Lou Jones	31 December 1993
5.18	"Slapstick"	John Mills	Robert Sidaway, Ashley Sidaway, Maurice Sellar and Lou Jones	2 January 1994
5.19	"Rebel"	John Mills	Robert Sidaway, Ashley Sidaway, Maurice Sellar and Lou Jones	16 February 1994
5.20	"Supernatural"	John Mills	Robert Sidaway, Ashley Sidaway, Maurice Sellar and Lou Jones	23 February 1994
5.21	"A Way of Life"	John Mills	Robert Sidaway, Ashley Sidaway, Maurice Sellar and Lou Jones	23 February 1994
5.22	"Fantasy"	John Mills	Robert Sidaway, Ashley Sidaway, Maurice Sellar and Lou Jones	2 March 1994
5.23	"Chase"	John Mills	Robert Sidaway, Ashley Sidaway, Maurice Sellar and Lou Jones	9 March 1994
5.24	"Conflict"	John Mills	Robert Sidaway, Ashley Sidaway, Maurice Sellar and Lou Jones	10 March 1994
5.25	"Battle Cry"	John Mills	Robert Sidaway, Ashley Sidaway, Maurice Sellar and Lou Jones	23 March 1994
5.26	"Thriller"	John Mills	Robert Sidaway, Ashley Sidaway, Maurice Sellar and Lou Jones	31 March 1994
