= Barry Pilton =

British writer

Barry Pilton (born 1946 in Croydon, Surrey) is a travel writer, radio and television comedy scriptwriter and novelist. He was educated in Dulwich College and King's College London. In 1967-8 he taught English in Paris and from 1969 worked as a journalist on the Sunday Post, becoming a freelance writer in 1976. He has worked on Not the Nine O'Clock News, Shelley, Week Ending and Spitting Image. Between 1984 and 1999 he lived in Llandefailogfach near Brecon in Mid Wales and his first novel The Valley is concerned with the effect of outsiders on the rural status quo. He now lives in Bristol, and is working on a television adaptation of The Valley.

== Travel Writing ==
- Miles of London (1981) (with Sybil Harper) ISBN 0-354-04652-7
- One Man and His Bog (1986) (on walking the Pennine Way) ISBN 0-552-12796-5
- One Man and His Log (1988) (on sailing the Canal du Nivernais in France) ISBN 0-552-13233-0
- An Innocent Abroad (1997) ISBN 0-552-99717-X

== Novels ==
- The Valley (2005) ISBN 0-7475-7168-6
- Town with No Twin (2007) ISBN 0-7475-8956-9
- Land of My Neighbours (2009) ISBN 1-4088-0272-4
