= Dark Knight (TV series) =

- Genre: Action; Adventure
- Created by: Terry Marcel
- Written by: Ashley Sidaway; Keith Claxton; Phil O'Shea; Ben Aaronovitch; Andrew Cartmel
- Directed by: Keith Claxton; Terry Marcel; Harley Cokeliss; Declan Eames; Mark Ezra
- Starring: Charlotte Comer; Ben Pullen; Peter O'Farrell; Marama Jackson; Cameron Rhodes; Todd Rippon; Jeffrey Thomas; Desmond Kelly; Michael Wilson
- Music by: Mike Jones
- Country of origin: United Kingdom
- Original language: English
- No. of seasons: 2
- No. of episodes: 26 (list of episodes)

Production
- Executive producers: Phil Wallbank; Joseph D'morais
- Producers: Phil Wallbank; Terry Marcel; Joseph D'Morais
- Editor: Terry Marcel
- Production companies: Dark Knight Productions; Palana Productions

Original release
- Release: 1 July 2000 – 27 January 2002

Dark Knight is a 2000 TV series, based on Sir Walter Scott's novel Ivanhoe. This joint New Zealand/England production attempted to capitalize on the same sword and sorcery market successfully mined by Xena: Warrior Princess.

== Plot ==
In the year of 1193, Richard the "Lionheart", King of England, led the third Great Crusade to reclaim the Holy Land from the Turks. After the battle, on their return home to England, Richard and his Knights are captured by the forces of Austria's Emperor, and held prisoners of war in the castle of Austria. In the castle dungeon, the knights are being tortured to tell the Austrians the location of King Richard's treasure. But the knights reply "there is no treasure". The guards don't believe them. Then one of the English knights, Tancred, tells the head-guard that they do have one treasure that all of England will pay for - "King Richard" himself! The head-guard understands what he means - "a ransom.” Tancred agrees to return to England, to collect the ransom, telling the guard that Richard's brother Prince John will pay dearly for the king's freedom. The guard orders Tancred to tell the prince to raise "100,000 gold crowns.” He tells him when the Austrians have the money, King Richard and his Knights will be free and have their passage home. He gives Tancred three months; if he doesn't get the ransom in time, the Austrians will start killing his fellow knights. Of course, the knight chained close to Tancred believes the part about Prince John paying for King Richard's ransom to be false. The knight's name is Ivanhoe. As the guards release Tancred to return to England, looking the other way, Ivanhoe sees a sword close to him, kicks it into the air, and grabs it. The head-guard looks back and rushed over to Ivanhoe, but he stabs him, and freed himself. One of the other knights asks Ivanhoe release him, too, but the other knights warn Ivanhoe of the guards coming. As the two knights fight their way out, they say that Prince John will never pay Richard's ransom, and that Tancred will betray them all. Then one of the guards shoots the brave knight in the chest with a crossbow. He tells Ivanhoe, "King Richard must be ransomed! England must be saved! Go, Ivanhoe! Go!" Ivanhoe kills the guard, and runs out the door. He escapes on a horse, and rides off west, towards England. Ivanhoe returns home a month later, planning to return to his family home to make peace with his father, raise the ransom, and restore King Richard to the throne of England.

== Cast ==
- Ben Pullen as Ivanhoe
- Charlotte Comer as Rebecca
- Peter O'Farrell as Odo
- Jeffrey Thomas as Mordour
- Christopher Neame as Mordour (first 2 episodes)
- Cameron Rhodes as Prince John
- Todd Rippon as Falco
- Michael Wilson as Friar Bacon
- Desmond Kelly as Fingal
- Adam Brookfield as Tancred
- Dwayne Cameron

== Episodes ==
=== Season 1 ===
- E1 - Dark Knight, Pt. 1 - 2000-07-01
- E2 - Dark Knight, Pt. 2 - 2000-07-01
- E3 - Marjan the Magnificent - 2000-07-08
- E4 - King of the Woods - 2000-07-15
- E5 - Ultimate Sword - 2000-07-22
- E6 - Spellbound - 2000-07-29
- E7 - Games Master - 2000-08-05
- E8 - Possessor - 2000-08-12
- E9 - Deadly Assassin - 2000-08-19
- E10 - Golden Bird - 2000-08-26
- E11 - Dragon Singer - 2000-09-09
- E12 - High Elf - 2000-09-16
- E13 - Stolen Souls - 2000-09-23

=== Season 2 ===
- E1 - Boneman - 2001-11-17
- E2 - Puppet Master - 2001-11-24
- E3 - Damned - 2001-12-01
- E4 - The Claw - 2001-12-08
- E5 - Black Tree - 2001-12-15
- E6 - Kha - 2001-12-22
- E7 - Stormguard - 2001-12-29
- E8 - Shadowraiths - 2002-01-06
- E9 - Streng - 2002-01-13
- E10 - Thunderknight - 2002-01-20
- E11 - Scorpion - 2002-01-27
- E12 - Stonegod
- E13 - Shameer

== Released as DVD ==
While originally set to be released as a television series, the episodes were instead edited together and released as a 91-minute DVD in 2002, distributed by MTI Home Video and 20th century Fox... as Darkest Knight in the United Kingdom and as Fantasy Quest in the United States. AllRovi offered that series star, "humorless Ben Pullen, who looks like a young, underdeveloped Arnold Schwarzenegger, and CGI monsters that look like they were shot from a video game screen, no doubt were the potential TV series' downfall.
