= Bob Danvers-Walker =

British radio, television and newsreel announcer (1906–1990)

- Born: Cyril Frederick Danvers-Walker; 11 October 1906; Cheam, Surrey, England
- Died: 17 May 1990 (aged 83); Oxford, Oxfordshire, England
- Occupations: Radio, television and newsreel presenter
- Known for: Voice of Pathé News
- Spouse: Vera Nita White (m. 1933)

Cyril Frederick "Bob" Danvers-Walker (11 October 1906 – 17 May 1990) was a British radio and newsreel announcer best known as the voice of Pathé News cinema newsreels during the Second World War and for many years afterward.

His voice was described as "clear, fruity and rich, with just the suggestion of raffishness". Kenneth Branagh has stated that he was consciously imitating Danvers-Walker's "perky tone" in a spoof "newsreel" segment in his 2000 film Love's Labour's Lost.

== Biography ==
Born in Belmont near Cheam, Surrey, Danvers-Walker was the son of William Charles Danvers-Walker, an Australian, who married in 1901 Lilian Danvers, daughter of Frederic Charles Danvers. He used the surname Walker to the 1950s. He spent much of his childhood in Tasmania and began his radio career in Melbourne, in 1925, moving on briefly to 2FC in Sydney, in 1932, before returning to the United Kingdom the same year.

From 1932 to 1939, Walker worked as a presenter for the International Broadcasting Company (IBC) network of commercial radio stations broadcasting in English to Britain from the continent. He became Chief Announcer at Radio Normandy. He also helped the IBC to set up radio stations at Toulouse, Paris, Lyon, Madrid, Barcelona, and Valencia, but Radio Normandy was always the company's flagship station, and Danvers-Walker was heard regularly over its airwaves until the station was closed down at the start of the Second World War in 1939.

Danvers-Walker wanted to join the BBC as soon as the war started, but was prevented by a BBC rule against employing anyone who had worked on commercial radio. This rule was quietly dropped in 1943, and from then on he was deployed on a variety of morale-boosting wartime BBC radio shows, including Round and About and London Calling Europe. He was the commentator for the British Pathé newsreel, a job he held continuously from 1940 to 1970.

Bob Danvers-Walker also worked freelance for many radio and television outlets. He was the announcer on the "rebel" version of the comedy programme Much-Binding-in-the-Marsh on Radio Luxembourg when the show was in temporary exile from the BBC (1950–51), and for the science-fiction series Dan Dare, Pilot of the Future on the same station (1951–55). He took part in the "stunt" programme People are Funny on Luxembourg, recorded around the UK and presented by Peter Martyn.

The arrival of ITV (commercial television) in 1955 brought new opportunities, including as the announcer on Michael Miles' game show Take Your Pick! (1955–68) and its successor programme, Wheel of Fortune (1969–71). At BBC Radio, Danvers-Walker was one of the regular presenters of Housewives' Choice throughout the 1950s, and contributed to many other programmes, including in the 1960s Holiday Hour and Countryside. For BBC Television he featured regularly in Saturday Night Out. He also appeared in a number of feature films, often as himself.

In 1985 and 1986, he appeared in the documentary Around The World In Seven Minutes And Four Times On Saturday, which was broadcast on BBC Two.

Danvers-Walker died of cancer in the Churchill Hospital, Oxford, England, on 17 May 1990, and was survived by his wife Vera Nita White, whom he had married in 1933; they had a son and a daughter. On an audio clip from Radio Normandy, his colleague Roy Plomley is heard referring to him as "Bob Walker", but he was described as "C. Danvers-Walker" in the station's programme schedules printed in Radio Pictorial on (for example) 3 May 1935. Conversely, a 1962 Pathé News Issue Sheet lists him as "R. Walker".

== Honours ==
Danvers-Walker was named The World's Most Durable Commentator in the Guinness Book of Records.

== Sources ==
- Sean Street, "Radio For Sale: Sponsored Programming in British Radio during the 1930s", Bournemouth University, 1999
- George Nobbs, "The Wireless Stars", Norwich, 1972, SBN 903 61900 8
