= Terry Finn =

American actress

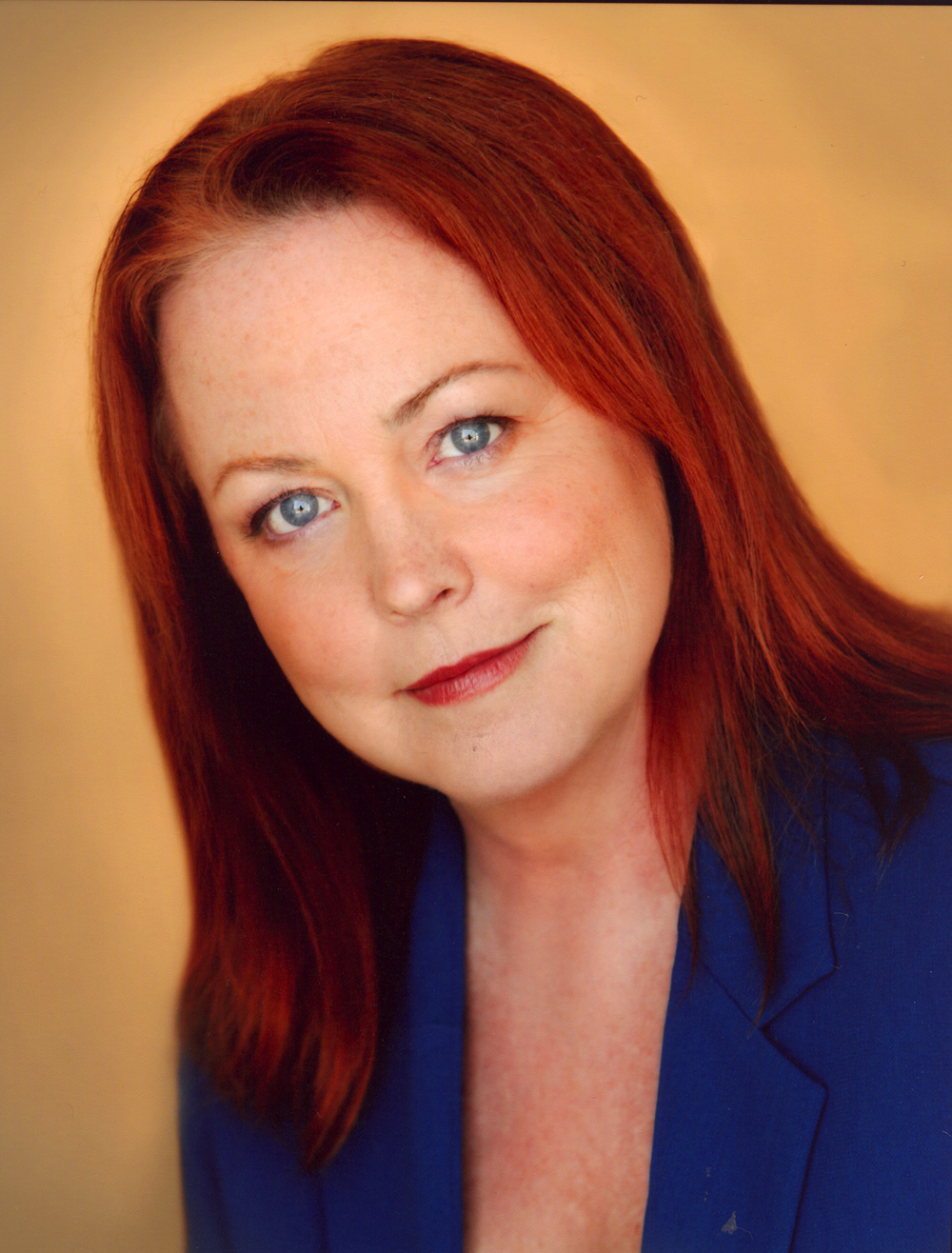
- Born: Teresa Jo Ann Bernadette Finn; August 6, 1955 (age 71); Long Island City, New York
- Education: Iona College (BA)
- Occupation: Actress
- Spouse: David L. Snyder (m. 1990)
- Children: 1

Teresa Jo Ann Bernadette "Terry" Finn (born August 6, 1955) is an American actress best known for creating the role of Gussie Carnegie in the original Broadway cast of the Stephen Sondheim/Hal Prince/George Furth musical comedy Merrily We Roll Along and its Original Cast Album.

== Early life ==
Terry was born in Long Island City, New York, the fifth child of Katherine (née Conley), an elementary school teacher, and Peter David Finn, a New York City fireman stationed in Brooklyn. Growing up on the Island, Finn attended St. Pius X Elementary School in Plainview. She made her stage debut at the age of 11 as a member of the Pius Players in the leading role of Flora in The Innocents. She attended high school at Queen of the Rosary Academy in Amityville where she studied to go on to a teaching career.

Finn began undergrad studies at Iona College in New Rochelle as a psychology major. Following an impromptu audition for Professor Roderick Nash, she was persuaded to switch her major to Communication Arts in the Theatre Department. As a member of the Iona Players, Finn appeared in a series of leading roles, from Blanche Du Bois in A Streetcar Named Desire to Sally Bowles in Cabaret. Following her graduation, she was once again persuaded to return to Iona during post-grad summer session and was cast in the lead as Maria in West Side Story, this was her third Stephen Sondheim musical, which included roles as Marta in Company and Young Dolly in Follies.

== Stage career ==
Finn made her Broadway debut at the Morosco Theatre in Hugh Leonard's A Life as understudy to Dana Delany. Following A Life, casting director Joanna Merlin chose Finn to create the role of Gussie Carnegie in Merrily We Roll Along. With music and lyrics by Stephen Sondheim, book by George Furth and direction by Hal Prince, this stage production is considered a musical theatre legend in spite of the fact that it closed after 52 previews and 16 performances. Despite a flurry of negative reviews, Clive Barnes raved in the New York Post that "A beautifully acrid comic skit is provided by Terry Finn as a producer's wife with even less morals than taste and a turn a phrase that would cause a viper to bite out its tongue in envy," and in the New York Daily News Douglas Watt wrote "There is also good work by Jason Alexander and his gushingly imperious wife Terry Finn." Following the brief run at the Alvin Theatre, the cast gathered at RCA Records Studio 'A' on November 29, 1981 — the day after the show closed — to record the original cast album. The album's popularity eventually led to a "Merrily We Roll Along Original Broadway Cast Reunion Concert" which was staged at the La Guardia Concert Hall in Lincoln Center on September 30, 2002. Following a search outlined in a Broadway.com article entitled "Finding Finn," Merrily director Lonny Price recalled, "Terry was dazzling in the role of Gussie ... I couldn't imagine doing [the reunion] without her and now I'm glad that I don't have to!" Finn was reunited with her original cast mates in the one-night-only benefit that raised more than $200,000 for Musical Theatre Works. Robert Simonson and Kenneth Jones of Playbill.com noted that the "inclusion of lesser-known songs considerably beefed up the role of Gussie, played by Terry Finn, who is barely present on the show's famous original cast album." Finn is interviewed in Best Worst Thing That Ever Could Have Happened, a 2016 documentary film recalling the history of the show and the later lives of its actors, directed by Lonny Price.

Off Broadway, Finn appeared as Pearl Gordon in Clifford Odets's Paradise Lost at The Mirror Repertory Company under the direction of John Strasberg, as Kate Poplin in Big Maggie at the Douglas Fairbanks Theatre, as Audrey in William Shakespeare's As You Like It with the New York Acting Unit and in regional theatre starred as Constanze Weber-Mozart in Peter Shaffer's play Amadeus in The Wells Theatre at The Virginia Stage Company. The Navy News critic Janet Withers wrote that Finn's Constanze is "beautiful, talented and engagingly saucy."

== Television career ==
In addition to work in daytime soap operas in New York City, Finn has appeared in television movies, starring as Margie Moran in Seeds of Tragedy for Fox Television Network, The Disappearance of Nora for CBS Television and Shadow of Obsession on NBC. In her television series debut, she guest starred as Mrs. Kitty Conley in an episode of Trial By Jury entitled 'Psychic Vision'. starring Raymond Burr. Produced by Dick Clark Productions and directed by Marty Passeta, Jr., it aired on September 15, 1989.

== Film career ==
Finn's film debut was in Orion Pictures Bill & Ted's Bogus Journey (1991), followed by the 1993 Hollywood Pictures/Nintendo film Super Mario Bros. Super Mario Bros. star Bob Hoskins invited Finn to co-star in a film project he was planning to star in and direct. This film was the 1995 fantasy Rainbow, with Finn in the leading role of Jackie Bailey and Hoskins as Frank Bailey, Jackie's father-in-law. Between Super Mario Bros. and Rainbow, Finn appeared as the Birthday Mom in Hollywood Pictures' Terminal Velocity (1994). In 2003, she appeared once again with Hoskins in Den of Lions. Finn will next be seen in the 2012 feature film Days of Wrath as Emily Conley.

== Personal life ==
Finn married motion picture production designer David L. Snyder on August 1, 1990, on Central Park West in New York City. They have a son Finn Henry Snyder who was born in Beverly Hills, California, on October 2, 1997. In 2005, they renewed their vows in the former offices of George Harrison's Handmade Films in Los Angeles, California, where they first met in January 1989.
