= David Snyder =

American film and television production designer

- Born: September 22, 1944 (age 81); Buffalo, New York, U.S.
- Occupation(s): Film production designer, art director, producer
- Spouse: Terry Finn (m. 1990)
- Children: 3

David L. Snyder (born September 22, 1944) is an American film and television production designer. He has worked as an art director, producer, and assistant director on films including Blade Runner, Bill & Ted's Bogus Journey, The Whole Nine Yards, and the television programs Buck Rogers in the 25th Century and Battlestar Galactica. He was nominated for the Academy Award for Best Art Direction for his work on Blade Runner at the 55th Academy Awards. The film won the BAFTA for Production Design in 1983.

== Career ==
Snyder was born in Buffalo, New York and attended the Technical High School, where he developed an interest in film work, creating the 1959 Tech High Musical Revue. Twenty years later, he became the assistant art director for the 50th Academy Awards, having spent time as an architectural designer, toy designer and musician. Universal Studios later appointed Snyder as art director for Buck Rogers in the 25th Century, Battlestar Galactica and The Incredible Hulk. In 1982, Snyder worked with Ridley Scott on Blade Runner, for which he shared an Academy Award nomination with production designer Lawrence G. Paull.

Snyder has worked on more than 30 films, and is a member of The Directors Guild of America, The Academy of Motion Picture Arts and Sciences, The Academy of Television Arts and Sciences and the Art Directors Guild.

== Personal life ==
Snyder married his second wife, actress Terry Finn, on August 1, 1990, and the couple have a son Finn Henry. His eldest son, David Michael, is the Director of Corporate Sales for The Milwaukee Bucks basketball team and his daughter, Amy L. Taylor, is a film/TV make-up artist.
