= Willow Shields =

American actress

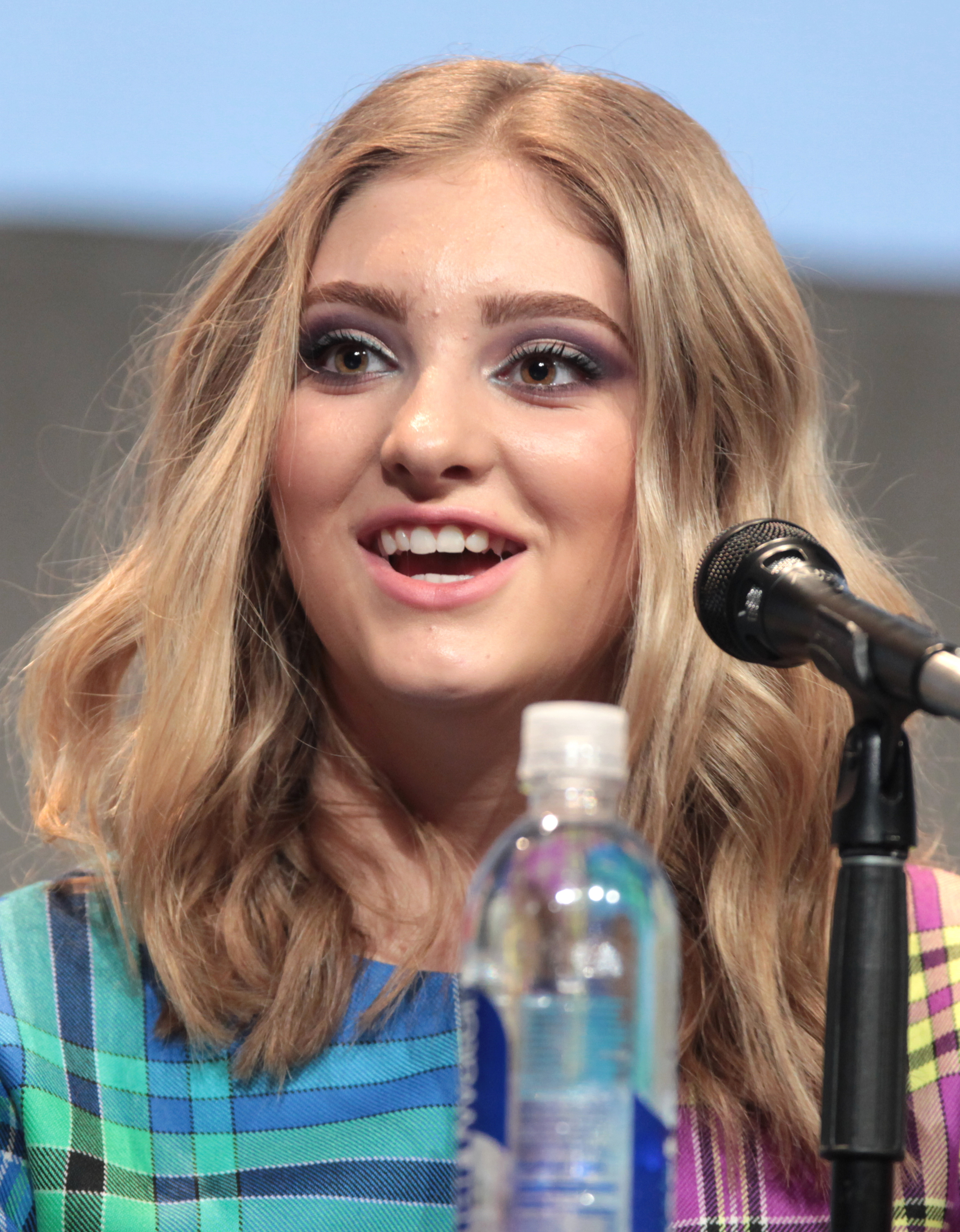
- Shields at San Diego Comic-Con in 2015
- Born: June 1, 2000 (age 26); Albuquerque, New Mexico, U.S.
- Occupation: Actress
- Years active: 2008–present

Willow Shields (born June 1, 2000) is an American actress. She is known for her portrayal of Primrose Everdeen in the sci-fi dystopian adventure film series The Hunger Games (2012–2015). She earned nominations for a Young Hollywood Award and an MTV Award for her performance in the franchise's second and fourth installments respectively.

Shields made her acting debut with a guest appearance on the drama series In Plain Sight (2009), and subsequently starred in a supporting role in the television film Beyond the Blackboard (2011). Following The Hunger Games series, she has since achieved mainstream recognition for headlining the international-production fantasy film Into the Rainbow (2017), and playing Lorian in the drama film Woodstock or Bust (2019) and Serena in the Netflix drama series Spinning Out (2020).

== Early life ==
Willow Shields was born in Albuquerque, New Mexico, the daughter of Carrie and Rob Shields, an art teacher. Her older brother, River, and twin sister, Autumn, are also actors.

== Career ==
=== Beginnings and The Hunger Games film series (2008–2015) ===
Shields' first job was in 2008, where she had a small narrating role in the short film Las Vegas New Mexico 1875. She then made her screen debut for playing Lisa Rogan on the USA drama series In Plain Sight, a minor character seen in the episode "In My Humboldt Opinion" which was released in 2009. In 2011, Shields appeared in the television film Beyond the Blackboard alongside actress Emily VanCamp. In the film, she portrays a homeless child named Grace.

Shields was next cast in the science fiction adventure film The Hunger Games in April 2011, her first feature film role, where she was given the supporting role of Primrose Everdeen. Released the following year in March, The Hunger Games broke several box-office records and emerged as one of the highest-grossing films of its year. It was positively received by critics and audiences, and helped bring Shields widespread recognition. On portraying Primrose, she has said that "just growing up as the character is going to be really fun".

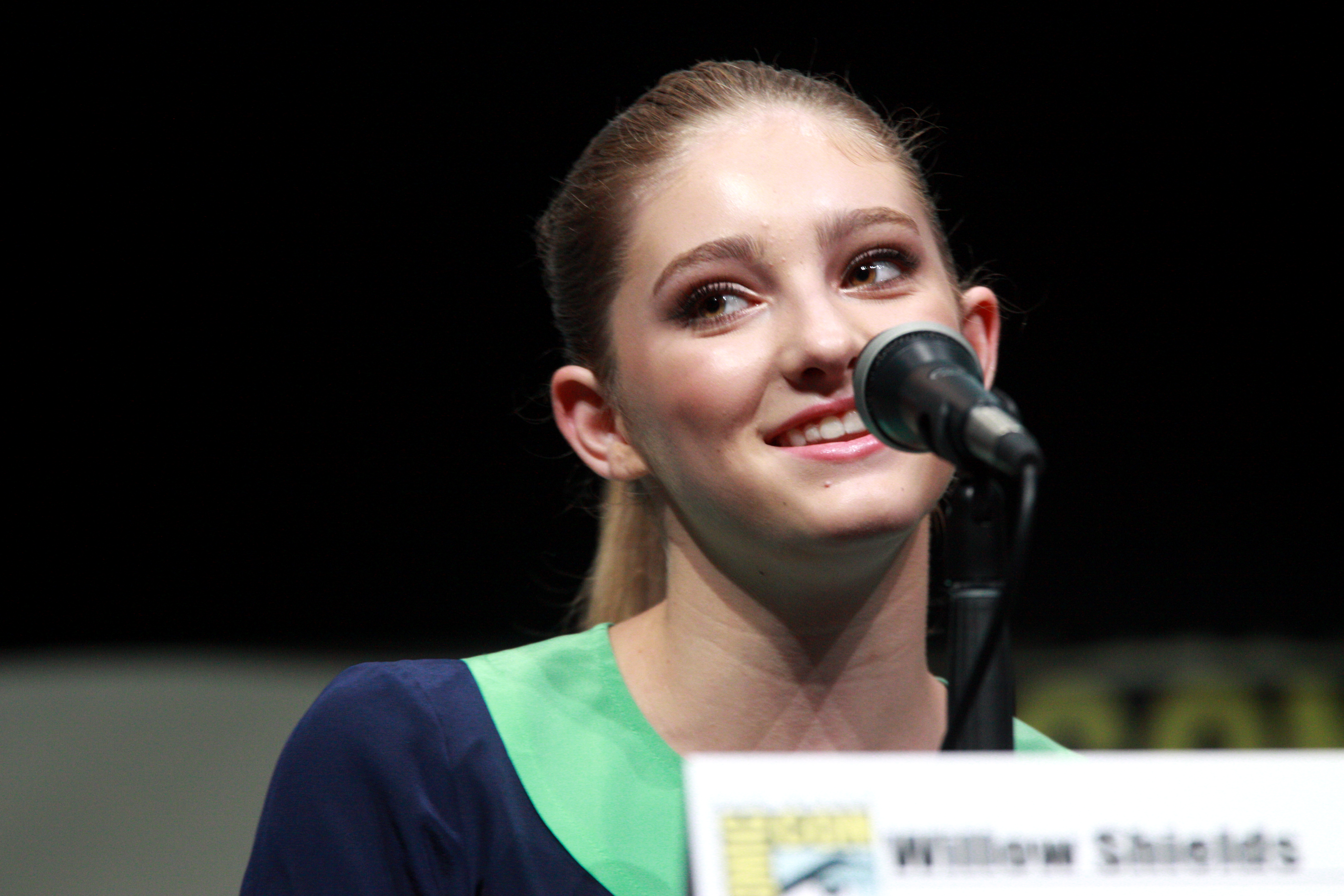
Shields at the 2013 San Diego Comic-Con

Shields went on to reprise the role of Primrose in the rest of the franchise. The series' second installment was the highest-grossing film of 2013, as well as the best received film of the franchise; she earned a nomination for a Young Hollywood Award for her performance in 2014. She was set to reprise the role for the series' final two films, Mockingjay Part 1 and Mockingjay Part 2, released in 2014 and 2015 respectively to critical and commercial success. The four films grossed a collective $2.97 billion at the box-office, which places it at 21st on the list of highest-grossing film franchises of all time. For Mockingjay Part 2, she received a nomination for an MTV Award.

=== Dancing With The Stars and mainstream roles (2016–present) ===
In 2012, it was announced that Shields would star as Rachel in the fantasy film The Wonder. Following a lengthy production, in which filming was done across China and New Zealand, it was released as Into the Rainbow in 2017, across various international film festivals. A theatrical release is planned, albeit it has been halted due to the COVID-19 pandemic. She was also cast in 2012 in the upcoming film A Fall From Grace, which is directed by Jennifer Lynch.

In February 2015, Shields was announced as one of the celebrities to compete on season 20 of the reality series Dancing with the Stars, where her professional partner was Mark Ballas. At age 14, she is the youngest competitor to ever appear on the show; the title previously belonged to Zendaya, who was 16 when she appeared on the series. The couple was controversially eliminated in the seventh week of competition, ultimately finishing in seventh place despite receiving consistently high scores from the judges throughout the season.

Dancing With the Stars performances

Week #	Dance/Song	Judges' score				Result
Week #	Dance/Song	Inaba	Goodman	Hough	Tonioli	Result
1	Cha-Cha-Cha / "Lips Are Movin"	6	6	6	6	No elimination
2	Argentine Tango / "Somebody That I Used to Know"	8	8	8	9	Safe
3	Paso Doble / "Hanuman"	8	8	8	8	Safe
4	Contemporary / "Atlas"	10	9	10	10	Safe
5	Foxtrot / "Alice's Theme"	8	8	9	9	Safe
6	Salsa / "Tequila"; Team Freestyle / "Wipe Out"	9; 10	8; 9	8; 10	9; 10	Safe
7	Jazz /"Electric Feel"; Salsa Dance-Off / "Temperature"	9 Awarded	9; 2	9 Extra	10; Points	Eliminated

In 2018, Shields headlined the coming-of-age independent film Woodstock or Bust as Lorian. Her performance gained praise from critics, and won her an award at the Artemis Women in Action Film Festival. In December of that year, it was announced that Shields was cast in the role of Serena Baker on the Netflix original series Spinning Out. A series centered on figure skating, her stunts were performed by stunt actor Kim Deguise Léveillée. Spinning Out was released in 2020 to generally positive reviews, however it was cancelled after one season.

== Personal life ==
In June 2022, Shields came out as bisexual on Instagram.

== Filmography ==
=== Film ===
Year	Title	Role	Notes
2008	Las Vegas, New Mexico 1875	Girl Watching Gun Fight	Short film; voice role
2012	The Hunger Games	Primrose Everdeen	
2013	The Hunger Games: Catching Fire	Primrose Everdeen	
2014	The Hunger Games: Mockingjay – Part 1	Primrose Everdeen	
2015	The Hunger Games: Mockingjay – Part 2	Primrose Everdeen	
2017	Into the Rainbow	Rachel	Originally titled The Wonder
2019	Woodstock or Bust	Lorian	
2022	When Time Got Louder	Abbie	
2023	Detective Knight: Independence	Ally	
2024	In Fidelity	Greta Ayker	

=== Television ===
Year	Title	Role	Notes
2009	In Plain Sight	Lisa Rogan / Lisa Royal	Episode: "In My Humboldt Opinion"
2011	Beyond the Blackboard	Grace	Television film
2012	R.L. Stine's The Haunting Hour	Eve	Episode: "Intruders"
2015	Dancing with the Stars	Herself / Contestant	Season 20
2019	The Unsettling	Maya	
2020	Spinning Out	Serena Baker	Main role

== Awards and nominations ==
Year	Award	Category	Work	Result	Ref
2014	Young Hollywood Awards	Best Cast-Chemistry Film	The Hunger Games: Catching Fire	Nominated	
2016	MTV Movie & TV Awards	Ensemble Cast	The Hunger Games: Mockingjay – Part 2	Nominated	
2019	Lady Filmmakers Film Festival	Best Supporting Actress	Woodstock or Bust	Nominated	
2019	Artemis Women in Action Film Festival	Best Actress	Woodstock or Bust	Won	
