= Moondial (disambiguation) =

A moondial is a timepiece based on the light of the moon. It may also refer to:

- Moondial (TV serial), a British six-part television serial
- MoonDial, a 2024 studio album by Pat Metheny
