= Triangle Metro Zoo =

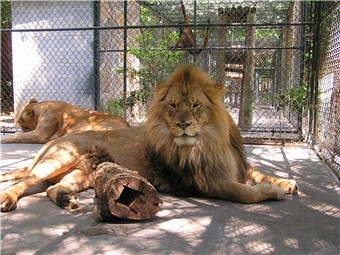
- Triangle Metro Zoo
- Interactive map of Triangle Metro Zoo
- 36.0084°N 78.4994°W
- Date opened: September 1998
- Date closed: 2006
- Location: Wake Forest, North Carolina, United States
- Land area: 40 acres (16 ha)
- No. of animals: ~500
- No. of species: ~85
- Website: www.trianglemetrozoo.com

Triangle Metro Zoo (originally Zoo Fauna) was a privately owned and operated 40-acre (16 ha) zoo that was open from 1998 until 2006. It was located in Wake Forest, North Carolina, United States.

== History ==
The zoo originated from Larry Seibel's long experience in breeding exotic animals, and was opened in 1998. It was situated in a heavily forested area astride a small stream. Its name derives from the area of North Carolina in which the zoo was located, which is called "the Triangle" because it comprises the three larger cities of Raleigh, Durham, and Chapel Hill.

Shortly after the zoo opened in 1998, the barn containing the gift shop and restrooms burned down, and was never rebuilt. The owner cited lack of facilities at the zoo due to this fire, which prevented him from putting up a permanent sign on Capital Boulevard, as one of many factors that led to the lack of funds for the zoo and its eventual closure.

Seibel closed the zoo in February 2006, citing money and personal problems, as well as encroaching development that would require him to fence the entire property. After the zoo closed, the Bengal tiger Raja, who Seibel and staff had rescued from neglectful owners, was moved to the Carnivore Preservation Trust in Pittsboro, North Carolina after having first been quarantined at the North Carolina Zoo. Other animals were transferred to various private collections and zoos.

== Animals ==
The zoo was home to some 500 animals representing 85 species. Mammals at the zoo included a Bengal tiger, blackbuck, Himalayan moon bears, camels, capybara, caracals, coati, donkeys, fallow deer, red kangaroos, lemurs, lions, llama, scimitar oryx, muntjac, sloths, servals, and zebras. Birds at the zoo included chickens, sarus cranes, red-crowned cranes, blue-and-gold macaws, scarlet macaws, military macaws, doves, emu, ostriches, pheasants, pigeons, toucans. Reptiles at the zoo included leopard geckos, bearded dragons, and various species of skinks and snakes.
