= Dark Season =

1991 British science-fiction TV serial

- Dark Season DVD cover, showing Eldritch on the left, and (from top to bottom) Pendragon, Marcie, Tom and Reet on the right
- Created by: Russell T Davies
- Directed by: Colin Cant
- Starring: Victoria Lambert; Ben Chandler; Kate Winslet; Brigit Forsyth; Grant Parsons; Jacqueline Pearce
- Country of origin: United Kingdom
- Original language: English
- No. of series: 1
- No. of episodes: 6

Production
- Producer: Richard Callanan
- Running time: 25 minutes

Original release
- Network: BBC1
- Release: 14 November – 19 December 1991

Dark Season is a British science-fiction television serial for adolescents, screened on BBC1 in late 1991.

== Premise ==
Made up of six 25-minute episodes, the two linked three-part stories tell the adventures of three teenagers and their battle to save their school and their classmates from the actions of the sinister Mr Eldritch. It was the first television drama to be written by Russell T Davies, and is also noteworthy for co-starring a young Kate Winslet in her first major television role.

== Background ==
Russell T Davies was a BBC staff producer working for the children's department at BBC Manchester, running the summertime activity show Why Don't You?. He had gained some television writing experience scripting the comedy dubbed version of The Flashing Blade for the Saturday morning children's programme On the Waterfront in 1989 and the children's sketch show Breakfast Serials the following year, but his real ambition was to write television drama.

To this end, he wrote an on-spec script for the first episode of Dark Season – originally titled The Adventuresome Three – and used the BBC's internal mail system to send it directly to the Head of Children's Programmes, Anna Home. Impressed with the script, Home asked Davies to write a second episode. When Tony Robinson decided to take a break from producing Maid Marian and Her Merry Men, a slot opened up in the Children's BBC schedules for late 1991 and Home decided to use Dark Season to fill it, commissioning Davies to write the remaining episodes of the serial. The series was filmed in Mytchett in Surrey, in Farnborough, Hampshire (Woburn Avenue) and the long-closed Robert Haining Secondary School, in the summer of 1991. Studio scenes were shot at the BBC's Ealing Studios.

Transmitted at 4.35 pm on Thursdays from 14 November to 19 December 1991, each episode would be repeated the Sunday morning following first broadcast. Viewing figures varied from 3.6 to 4.2 million per episode. Davies also penned a novelisation of Dark Season for BBC Books, which was released concurrently with the transmission of the serial and was advertised after each episode. He would later go on to write a second children's science-fiction serial for the BBC, Century Falls, in 1993, before forging a long and successful career in adult television drama. Dark Season was re-shown on BBC One in 1994, and in 2002 was also repeated on the CBBC Channel on digital television, cropped to 14:9 widescreen with the loss of the top and bottom sections of the original picture.

Dark Season was released on DVD by 2|entertain Ltd on 24 July 2006. Upon this release, it received a British Board of Film Classification rating of PG.

== Plot ==
The first three episodes begin with third year secondary school girl Marcie and her two fifth-year friends Tom and Reet becoming suspicious of the sinister Mr Eldritch, whose computer company arrives at the school and distributes free computers to all the pupils.

With the reluctant help of their teacher Miss Maitland they apparently defeat the threat of Eldritch, who disappears. However, the second three episodes tell of the actions of Miss Pendragon, who works for Eldritch and is attempting to revive the massive, secret Behemoth computer from its long-hidden location beneath the school.

At the end of the BBC novelisation, there are indications that Davies had ideas or interest in a potential third adventure using the same characters. A single paragraph describing the opening of an amusement arcade concludes with "...but that's another story."

== Cast and crew ==
The director assigned to Dark Season was Colin Cant, who had a long and highly esteemed reputation in producing BBC children's programmes, having for many years produced the popular school-based teen drama Grange Hill throughout the 1980s and directed classic children's serials such as Moondial (1988).

The three stars were 19-year-old Victoria Lambert as the 13-year-old Marcie, Ben Chandler as Tom and Kate Winslet, in her first major professional acting role, as Reet. There were several supporting actors who were well-known names on British television: Miss Maitland was played by Brigit Forsyth who had starred in the popular sitcom Whatever Happened to the Likely Lads? in the 1970s, and Miss Pendragon was played by Jacqueline Pearce, who was well known for her role as the villainous Servalan in the late 1970s / early 80s BBC science-fiction series Blake's 7, and known by Cant from working with her on the serial Moondial. According to an interview with SFX magazine, Davies said that Pearce was delighted that her character was supposed to be a lesbian, but refused to dye her hair, hence the turban.

== Episodes ==
The episodes were merely numbered, all sharing a gradually-revealed common plot. The six episodes are divided into two stories of three episodes each. The apparent conclusion of the first story at episode 3 seemed so complete to BBC executives that they were, according to Davies, "a bit shocked". This, in part, stemmed from the fact that he had not sold the programme to them as two three-part stories—"in case they told me not to do it!". By the conclusion of episode 6 it becomes apparent to the viewer that all six episodes tell a conjoined story, though split across two seemingly unrelated tales.

No.	Title	Directed by	Written by	Original release date
1	"Episode 1"	Colin Cant	Russell T Davies	14 November 1991
2	"Episode 2"	Colin Cant	Russell T Davies	21 November 1991
3	"Episode 3"	Colin Cant	Russell T Davies	28 November 1991
4	"Episode 4"	Colin Cant	Russell T Davies	5 December 1991
5	"Episode 5"	Colin Cant	Russell T Davies	12 December 1991
6	"Episode 6"	Colin Cant	Russell T Davies	19 December 1991

== Reception ==
The show received increased critical attention following both its release on DVD and Davies' announcement of his programme aimed at the same target audience, The Sarah Jane Adventures.

Television Heaven's review concluded by saying, "By turns amusing, aware, suspenseful, exciting and imaginative, 'Dark Season' stands as an almost criminally overlooked example of children's genre television of the highest quality, and also as an early indication of a future major creative talent in the form of Russell T Davies taking his first steps on the long and winding creative road to a glittering future."

Head writer of series 1 of The Sarah Jane Adventures, Gareth Roberts, found career inspiration in Dark Season. He has said that Dark Season "was exactly what I wanted to do at the time—write a cracking kids' sci-fi show."

Likewise, DVD Times called it "an enjoyable story", but criticised the split of the plot into two-halves as "clumsy". It further bemoaned a "tendency towards handwaving and gobbledygook to resolve the plot(s)".

== Commonality with Doctor Who ==
Dark Season contained some similarity to Doctor Who, which Russell T Davies revived in 2005. Most notably, Marcie occupies a similar narrative space to the Doctor, with Reet and Thomas as her companions. Nevertheless, this broad structural similarity to Doctor Who has been categorically denied by Russell T Davies as intentional. Davies has claimed that the only direct reference to so-called "classic" Doctor Who is a scene in which Reet uses a yo-yo to test gravity.

Nevertheless, elements from this production have been seen in Doctor Who fiction which post-dates Dark Season.

The earliest reference was a direct mention of Marcie in Davies' 1996 Doctor Who – The New Adventures novel Damaged Goods. Later, when Doctor Who was again being produced on television, Davies trapped Rose Tyler behind a door that refused to open In "The End of the World" – just as he had done with Reet in Episode Six of Dark Season. When challenged by their rescuers not to go anywhere, both characters offered the same response: "Where am I gonna go, Ipswich?". Dark Season would again be recalled in 2006, when the similarity between the setting of Dark Season and the 2006 episode "School Reunion" received frequent attention. Though Davies did not write the script for "School Reunion", he requested its relocation from an army base to a school, evocative of Dark Season.

By far the strongest links between the serials are found in Davies' 2008 Christmas special, "The Next Doctor", which recycles elements of the 'Behemoth' in the 'CyberKing'. In both Dark Season and "The Next Doctor", the lead female villains are tricked into enthronement & entrapment inside a monster of their own making, which they accept as their destiny, but this leads to their downfall.

== Revival ==
In September 2021, Russell T Davies announced that he was working on an audiobook version of the original TV show (released in November 2021) and a possible sequel. A sequel audiodrama announcement was confirmed in November 2022 and was released in May 2023 on Big Finish Productions. It featured Kate Winslet, Victoria Lambert, Ben Chandler, and Brigit Forsyth reprising their roles of Reet, Marcie, Tom, and Jessica Maitland. Bethany Antonia, Lu Corfield, Jacob Dudman, Grant Parsons, and Aitch Wylie played Nina Lewis, Miss Maitland, Jack Parton, Mr Eldritch, and Taylor Sullivan respectively.

No.	Title	Directed by	Written by	Released
1	"Spring"	Scott Handcock	Tim Foley	May 2023
2	"Summer"	Scott Handcock	Chris Chapman	May 2023
3	"Autumn"	Scott Handcock	James Goss	May 2023
4	"Winter"	Scott Handcock	Russell T Davies	May 2023
