= Brook Williams =

British actor

- Born: Brook Richard Williams; 22 January 1938; Chelsea, London, England
- Died: 29 April 2005 (aged 67); London, England
- Occupation: Actor
- Years active: 1959–1995
- Spouse: Liz Holloway (divorced)

Brook Richard Williams (22 January 1938 – 29 April 2005) was a British stage actor who also made numerous film and television appearances in small roles.

== Biography ==
His father was the Welsh playwright and actor Emlyn Williams. His older brother Alan was a foreign correspondent and novelist.

Brook was born in London and attended Stowe School in Buckinghamshire. After national service in the RAF he appeared on stage in repertory theatre, in London's West End and abroad on tour.

His film appearances included: The Plague of the Zombies (1966), Where Eagles Dare (1968), Anne of the Thousand Days (1969), Villain (1971), The Wild Geese (1978) and The Sea Wolves (1980). He was a close friend, assistant and advisor to actor Richard Burton who had known him since he was a child and he appeared in several films in which Burton starred. He died of lung cancer aged 67.

== Partial filmography ==
- The V.I.P.s (1963) - First Reporter (uncredited)
- First Men in the Moon (1964) - astronaut (uncredited)
- Hot Enough for June (1964) - Leon
- The Heroes of Telemark (1965) - Einar
- The Plague of the Zombies (1966) - Dr. Peter Tompson
- The Jokers (1967) - Capt. Green (uncredited)
- Where Eagles Dare (1968) - Sgt. Harrod
- Anne of the Thousand Days (1969) - Sir William Brereton
- The Raging Moon (1971) - Hugh Collins
- Raid on Rommel (1971) - Joe Reilly
- Villain (1971) - Kenneth
- Hammersmith Is Out (1972) - Pete Rutter
- Battle of Sutjeska (1973)
- Massacre in Rome (1973) - SS Hauptsturmführer Erich Priebke
- Equus (1977) - Bit part (uncredited)
- The Medusa Touch (1978) - Male Nurse
- The Wild Geese (1978) - Samuels
- Absolution (1978) - Father Clarence
- North Sea Hijack (1980) - Helicopter Pilot
- The Sea Wolves (1980) - Butterworth
- Pascali's Island (1988) - Turkish Officer
- Testimony (1988) - H.G. Wells
- The 5th Monkey (1990) - Dr. Howard
- The Children (1990) - (uncredited)
- England, My England (1995) - Priest
- The Strange Case of Delphina Potocka or The Mystery of Chopin (1999) - Old Scottish Lord (final film role)
