= Jacqueline Pearce =

British actress (1943–2018)

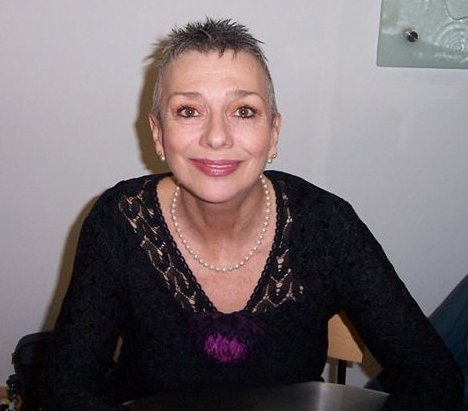
- Jacqueline Pearce at the Blake's 7 Series 2 DVD launch, 2005
- Born: 20 December 1943; Byfleet, Surrey, England
- Died: 3 September 2018 (aged 74); Lancashire, England
- Education: Royal Academy of Dramatic Art; Lee Strasberg Actors Studio
- Occupations: Actress; memoirist
- Years active: 1964–2018
- Known for: Blake's 7; The Two Doctors; The Plague of the Zombies; The Reptile; Moondial
- Spouse: Drewe Henley (m. 1963; div. 1967)

Jacqueline Pearce (20 December 1943 – 3 September 2018) was a British film and television actress. She was best known for her portrayal of the principal villain Servalan in the British science fiction TV series Blake's 7 (1978–1981), a performance which her obituarist in The Times wrote produced "a sexual awakening for a generation of sci-fi fans".

Pearce studied at both the Royal Academy of Dramatic Art and at the Actors Studio. After early roles in two Hammer horror films, The Plague of the Zombies and The Reptile, she played opposite Jerry Lewis in Don't Raise the Bridge, Lower the River. On stage, she acted in Otherwise Engaged, directed by Harold Pinter, and in Tom Stoppard's Night and Day, and she had numerous television, theatre and audio roles, including in Doctor Who, one notable role being the Doctor's companion Cardinal Ollistra in Big Finish Productions audio dramas.

She suffered from clinical depression during periods of her life, which she discussed in her memoir, From Byfleet to the Bush (2012). Pearce spent five years working at the Vervet Monkey Foundation in South Africa, before returning to the UK in 2015.

== Early life ==
Jacqueline Pearce was born in Byfleet, Surrey, on 20 December 1943. She grew up spending time both living at her father's home in Byfleet and with a foster family, after her mother had left when Pearce was 16 months old. She attended the Marist Convent School for Girls at West Byfleet, where one of the teachers encouraged her to pursue her ambition of acting, and after leaving school, Pearce successfully auditioned for the Royal Academy of Dramatic Art (RADA).

== Career ==
After graduating from RADA in 1963, Pearce made her television debut in the series A Question of Happiness, in which she played a waitress in the episode "Watch Me I'm a Bird", alongside her RADA contemporaries Drewe Henley, Ian McShane and John Hurt. In the same year, she flew to Yugoslavia to film a short appearance for the film Genghis Khan. She later appeared in minor roles in Danger Man and in Sky West and Crooked, where McShane played a character who was her boyfriend. In Spring 1965, she auditioned for Anthony Nelson Keys at Bray Studios, and won leading roles in two Hammer horror films, The Plague of the Zombies and The Reptile. These were filmed one after another on the same location and both released in 1966.

She married Henley in 1963, after they met when he directed her in a short film while they were at RADA. She divorced him in 1967 after he left her for Felicity Kendal. Pearce left for America in 1967 following her divorce and stayed there until 1971. She worked for Sammy Davis Jr., answering his fan mail, and trained at Lee Strasberg's Actors Studio in Los Angeles. In 1974, she appeared in the role of Rosa Dartle in the BBC dramatisation of Charles Dickens' David Copperfield (1974). In a 1975 television version of Christopher Hampton's stage play The Philanthropist, Pearce played Araminta. The show was criticised by Ann Sheldon Williams of The Stage, who felt that the production was not appropriate for a transfer to television as it should rely on some distancing from the audience, but felt that Pearce's performance "had the right blend of softness and predatoriness".

Pearce remains best known for her role as Servalan, the principal villain in the British science fiction TV series Blake's 7 (1978–1981). The character was originally written for one episode, but was expanded to a regular role over four series due to Pearce's popularity. Initially the "Supreme Commander", the character later became "President", and is cited by film and television scholar Steven Duckworth as one of the characters that develops significantly during the programme, which he regards as particularly notable as she is a villain. Duckworth also opines that Servalan "offers a potentially empowering female character through her transgression of established gender binaries, this nonconformity is closely bound up with her role as the show's primary villain". Pearce had her hair cropped short when auditioning for the role, and was asked by the producers to keep it short. She influenced the production team to dress her character in feminine clothes rather than the military uniform that they had suggested. Pearce reprised the role in a 90-minute play entitled The Sevenfold Crown on BBC Radio 4 in 1998, alongside several other original Blake's 7 cast members.

She said of Servalan that "I saw her as a woman who was very damaged and driven by pain ... what drove her was not a desire to be evil but a desire to escape from pain." In a 2000 interview for The Observer, Pearce said that, given her own low self-esteem, the role had affected her personal life for years, as she had been attracted to the character's power and taken on some aspects of Servalan's personality, telling the interviewers that it had taken "the best years of my life to recover from Servalan".

The Aberdeen Press and Journal reviewer Tom Lynch referred to Pearce as Servalan as "one of telly's finest baddies". Roy West of the Liverpool Echo felt that "Amid a number of nebulous performances, [Pearce is] a shining star." Historian Dominic Sandbrook wrote in his Who Dares Wins: Britain, 1979–1982 (2019) that "Played with scenery-chewing relish by Jacqueline Pearce, Servalan is at once immensely glamorous and thoroughly evil" and drew a parallel with UK Prime Minister Margaret Thatcher, who took office in 1979, in that both were "perfectly happy to exploit [their] femininity". Vanessa Thorpe and Jakki Phillips said in The Observer in 2000 that "she was the evil genius who haunted the dreams of adolescent boys. With her pathological lust for power and low voice, early encounters with Servalan, the arch-villainess of the BBC sci-fi series Blake's Seven, are remembered as formative experiences by many who were young in the Seventies." Pearce's obituary in The Times stated that her performance provoked "a sexual awakening for a generation of sci-fi fans".

Other film roles include the Carry On film Don't Lose Your Head (1966), White Mischief (1987), How to Get Ahead in Advertising (1989), and Princess Caraboo (1994). In Don't Raise the Bridge, Lower the River (1968) she played opposite Jerry Lewis in his first non-Hollywood film. Pearce told an interviewer in 1981 that as the film had been a commercial failure, it had not helped her career. She appeared as an associate of the assassin Carlos in the television movie, The Bourne Identity (1988). She also acted in theatre, including Otherwise Engaged, directed by Harold Pinter.

As well as appearing in the BBC children's programmes Dark Season (alongside Kate Winslet) and Moondial, Pearce appeared in the Doctor Who serial The Two Doctors (1985) as Chessene, a bloodthirsty alien, taking the role at short notice after Elizabeth Spriggs had left the production. She was later associated with Doctor Who again through her appearances in The Fearmonger as Sherilyn Harper, an audio drama by Big Finish Productions, and as Admiral Mettna in the webcast story Death Comes to Time. Pearce returned to Doctor Who in 2015, this time opposite John Hurt, as a regular in the Big Finish audio series based on the adventures of the War Doctor, portraying Cardinal Ollistra, a leader of the Time Lords in the Time War. Pearce also made guest appearances in TV series such as The Avengers, Public Eye, Callan, Dead of Night, Special Branch, Spy Trap, and The Young Indiana Jones Chronicles.

In 1980 Pearce played Ruth on stage in Tom Stoppard's Night and Day, a performance that Ann Fitzgerald in The Stage praised as she felt that Pearce had "an enviable range of tone and mood at her command". For the 1984/85 pantomime season, Pearce appeared in Cinderella at the Gaumont Theatre, Southampton, alongside Doctor Who actors Colin Baker, Mary Tamm, Anthony Ainley and Nicola Bryant. Pearce and her fellow Blake's 7 actor Paul Darrow (Avon) were voice actors for the 1996 videogame Gender Wars.

Her obituarist in The Daily Telegraph wrote that Pearce possessed "considerable depth and emotional range" which "was not often exploited", whilst her obituary in The Times read that "She could and should have achieved so much more. At Rada she was considered one of the most promising thespians of her generation by contemporaries such as Anthony Hopkins and John Hurt" but that her mental illness had "blighted her career".

== Personal life ==
Pearce suffered from clinical depression during periods of her life. She recounted in her memoir what she regarded as a profound personal and spiritual renaissance while volunteering at the Vervet Monkey Foundation in South Africa, where she had gone for a short stay, but ended up staying five years. She described "the joy of family which hadn't proved possible with human beings". Paul Owens of Starburst praised the book, which he described as a "tortured, agonized memoir of a woman battling with insecurity, mental illness, poverty, homelessness and disillusionment".

In addition to her marriage to Drewe Henley, from 1963 until their divorce in 1967, Pearce was married a second time, which also ended in divorce. Pearce returned to the UK in 2015. She was diagnosed with lung cancer in August 2018 and died on 3 September 2018 at her home in Lancashire.

== Filmography ==
=== Television ===
Year	Title	Role	Notes	Ref
1964	A Question of Happiness	girl in cafe	episode "Watch me I'm a bird"	
1964	A Question of Happiness	Frances	episode "Fred"	
1964	Danger Man	Jeannie	episode "Don't Nail Him Yet"	
1965	Giants on Saturday	girl in pub		
1966	Public Eye	Jill	episode "Tell Me About the Crab"	
1966	The Avengers	Marianne Gray	episode "A Sense of History"	
1967	Haunted	Jenny Bryce	episode "I Like It Here"	
1967	Theatre 625	Eva Franzia	episode "The Magicians: The Incantation of Casanova"	
1967	Man in a Suitcase	Miss Brown	episode "Sweet Sue"	
1968	Armchair Theatre	cast member	episode "The Glove Puppet"	
1968	The Root of All Evil?	Connie	episode "West of Eden"	
1968	Man in a Suitcase	Ruth Klinger	episode "Somebody Loses, Somebody...Wins?"	
1969	Callan	Eva	episode "Once a Big Man, Always a Big Man"	
1971	The Rivals of Sherlock Holmes	Jenny Pryde	episode "The Case of the Dixon Torpedo"	
1972	New Scotland Yard	Leonie Peters	episode "The Banker"	
1972	Dead of Night	Sarah Hopkirk	episode "Bedtime"	
1973	The Edwardians	Countess Halecka	episode "Lloyd George"	
1973	Hadleigh	Sue	episode "Second Thoughts"	
1974–1975	David Copperfield	Rosa Dartle		
1974	The Aweful Mr. Goodall	Madame Prigent	episode "Clara"	
1974	Vienna 1900	Anna Rupius	2 episodes	
1974	Special Branch	Helga Moritz	episode "Catherine the Great"	
1975	Churchill's People	Mrs Parker	episode "Mutiny"	
1975	Couples	Claudia Haswell	5 episodes	
1975	Spy Trap	Helen Machin	episode "With Friends Like You"	
1975	The Philanthropist	Araminta		
1977	Leap in the Dark	Dorothy McEwan	episode "The Ghost of Ardachie Lodge2	
1978–1981	Blake's 7	Servalan		
1978	Shadows	hostess	episode "And for My Next Trick"	
1979	Measure for Measure	Mariana		
1980	Star Games	on-screen participant		
1985	What Mad Pursuit?	cast member		
1985	Doctor Who	Chessene	serial The Two Doctors	
1988	The Bourne Identity	Madame Jacqui		
1988	Moondial	Miss Vole/Miss Raven	5 episodes	
1991	Dark Season	Miss Pendragon	3 episodes	
1993	The Young Indiana Jones Chronicles	Annabelle Levi	episode "Paris October 1916"	
1999	Mrs. Pollifax	cast member		
2002	Daniel Deronda	Baroness Langen		
2006	Casualty	Elspeth Lang	episode "No Place Like..."	
2016	Pointless Celebrities	on-screen participant		

=== Film ===
Year	Title	Role	Notes	Ref.
1965	Changes	cast member	short	
1965	Genghis Khan	Shah's Daughter		
1966	Sky West and Crooked	Cammellia		
1966	The Plague of the Zombies	Alice Tompson		
1966	The Reptile	Anna Franklyn		
1967	Don't Lose Your Head	Third lady		
1968	Don't Raise the Bridge, Lower the River	Pamela Lester		
1980	Weekend	cast member	student film	
1988	White Mischief	Idina		
1989	How to Get Ahead in Advertising	Maud		
1994	Princess Caraboo	Lady Apthorpe		
1995	The Contract	cast member	short	
1998	Guru in Seven	Joan, 'The oyster lady'		

=== Theatre ===
Dates	Title	Role	Venue	Notes	Ref.
1964	The Judge	Pat Dean	Cambridge Theatre	author: John Mortimer, director: Stuart Burge	
1968	Smile Boys, That's the Style	Kate Wood	Citizens Theatre	author: John Hale, director: Michael Blakemore	
1975	Otherwise Engaged		Queen's Theatre	director: Harold Pinter	
1977	A Midsummer Night's Dream	Titania	Northcott Theatre, and tour of Devon and Cornwall	director: Geoffrey Reeves	
1980	Night and Day	Ruth	Belgrade Theatre	author: Tom Stoppard, director: Robert Hamlin	
1981	Witness for the Prosecution		Essex Hall, London	author: Agatha Christie, director: Robert Henderson	
1981	Wait Until Dark		Haymarket Theatre, Basingstoke	Author: Frederick Knott, director: Cyril Frankel	
1983	Outlaw		Haymarket Studio, Leicester, and national tour	author: Michael Abbensetts, director: Robert Gillespie	
1992	Shadowlands	Ruth	Belgrade Theatre	author: William Nicholson, director: Rumu Sen-Gupta	
1997	When God wanted a Son		New End Theatre	author: Arnold Wesker, director: Spencer Butler	
1999	A Star is Torn	Co-writer and performer	Gilded Ballroom (Edinburgh Festival Fringe)	Co-writer and director: Spencer Butler	
2000	Deception	Marlborough Pub and Theatre			
2001	Aphrodite Blues	New End Theatre			
2001	Dangerous Corner	Garrick Theatre	Maud Mockridge		
