= Global Federation of Animal Sanctuaries =

US-based nonprofit organization

- Founded: 2007
- Founders: Adam M. Roberts, Michael Markarian, Kim Haddad, Philip Wilson
- Type: National not-for-profit organization
- Purpose: Certification of animal sanctuaries, rescue centers and rehabilitation centers
- Location: Phoenix, Arizona
- Region served: Worldwide
- Method: Accreditation, Verification
- Website: sanctuaryfederation.org

Global Federation of Animal Sanctuaries (GFAS) is a 501(c)(3) nonprofit organization that sets standards of care and provides accreditation and support for animal sanctuaries, rescue centers, and rehabilitation centers. It is based in Phoenix, Arizona, but operates globally.

In many municipalities, businesses can identify as animal "rescue centers" or "sanctuaries" without meeting core animal welfare standards. A 2018 law review found that many US "sanctuaries" and "rescue centers" neglect their animals and commit egregious violations of the Animal Welfare Act. GFAS was launched in 2007 to help address this problem. The group was founded by leaders from different groups in the animal welfare sector, including Born Free USA, the Humane Society of the United States, and the World Society for the Protection of Animals.

GFAS accreditation is used as a barometer for state animal licensing protocols (determining the outlets allowed to operate in a given state); by foundations selecting among possible grantees; and by animal welfare advocates advising the public on places to visit or financially support.

== Overview ==
Founded in 2007, GFAS accredited its first US sanctuary in 2009 and its first international sanctuary in 2011. By 2012, it had 100 accredited sanctuaries. As of December 31, 2023, GFAS has 132 accredited groups; 83 verified; operating in 18 countries.

GFAS accreditation has been called the "gold standard" of animal care, with standards that, according to one animal rights group, "far exceed" those outlined in the Animal Welfare Act."

GFAS offers two tiers, Accreditation and Verifification, with Accreditation requiring a more rigorous set of screenings. The process of becoming accredited can take years, with multiple on-site visits, and elaborate policy and procedure reviews.

The downside of high standards and a rigorous screening process is that a majority of animal care facilities do not qualify and therefore remain largely unregulated. A 2017 review of organizations branding themselves as a "sanctuary" or "haven" in the United States found that only eight percent have earned an accreditation from GFAS.

In addition to its accreditation work, GFAS hosts workshops and webinars and assist sanctuaries; promotes the mission and conservation work of constituents; gives an annual award for "sanctuary excellence", and sponsors an annual Giving Day for Apes.

A few examples of sanctuaries with GFAS Accreditation or Verification: Donkey Sanctuary of Canada, Vervet Monkey Foundation, Lilongwe Wildlife Centre, Chimp Haven, Save the Chimps, Animals Asia, Bat World Sanctuary, and Carolina Tiger Rescue.
