= The Reptile =

1966 British film by John Gilling

- Theatrical release poster by Tom Chantrell
- Directed by: John Gilling
- Written by: Anthony Hinds
- Produced by: Anthony Nelson Keys
- Starring: Noel Willman; Jennifer Daniel; Ray Barrett; Jacqueline Pearce; Michael Ripper; John Laurie
- Cinematography: Arthur Grant
- Edited by: Roy Hyde; James Needs
- Music by: Don Banks
- Production companies: Hammer Film Productions; Seven Arts Productions
- Distributed by: Associated British-Pathé (United Kingdom); 20th Century Fox (United States)
- Release dates: 20 February 1966 (United Kingdom); 6 April 1966 (United States)
- Running time: 90 minutes
- Country: United Kingdom
- Language: English
- Budget: £100,599

The Reptile is a 1966 British supernatural horror film directed by John Gilling, and starring Noel Willman, Jacqueline Pearce, Ray Barrett, Jennifer Daniel, and Michael Ripper. Produced by Hammer Film Productions, it was released on a double bill with Rasputin, the Mad Monk.

== Plot ==
In the 19th century in the fictional village of Clagmoor Heath in Cornwall several locals are dying from what the locals call the "Black Death". Harry Spalding inherits his late brother Charles' cottage and arrives with his new bride, Valerie. The inhabitants of the village keep clear of the newly arrived couple and only the publican, Tom Bailey, befriends them. Tom explains that the hostility exhibited by the townspeople is the result of many mysterious deaths in the community.

The sinister Dr. Franklyn, the owner of the nearby Well House, is the only resident in the vicinity of the cottage and he lives with his daughter Anna. Franklyn treats Anna with cruel contempt and she is attended by a silent Malay servant.

Hoping to learn something of the deaths, Harry invites the local eccentric, 'Mad' Peter, home for dinner. After warning them that their lives are in danger, 'Mad' Peter quickly departs only to return later that evening with his face blackened and swollen before dying. The Spaldings attempt to alert Franklyn, but he arrogantly states that Peter's death is not his concern, explaining that he is a doctor of theology, not a doctor of medicine.

In an attempt to help Harry clear up the mystery, Tom illegally unearths Peter's corpse and discovers a strange neck wound like a snake bite. Harry and Tom dig up Charles’ coffin and find that his corpse also has those same marks. Realising that they are threatened by something far worse than they had ever imagined, Harry is quick to answer an urgent message from the Well House. There, he is bitten by a mysterious reptilian creature, but he still manages to return to his home and recover from the bite.

Meanwhile, at the Well House, Valerie witnesses Franklyn's attempt to kill Anna in the cavern where she is covered by a blanket, having shed her skin. A struggle ensues between Franklyn and the Malay, accidentally causing a lantern to be knocked over and setting the house ablaze. Franklyn throws the Malay to his death in the sulphur pool. Franklyn then imprisons Valerie in his study as he tells her how his daughter Anna was changed into the reptile creature after being abducted and cursed by a Malay snake cult that included the Malay servant. Now she sheds her skin every winter and he keeps her warm by keeping her next to the local sulphur pools under Well House. Upstairs, Franklyn is bitten by Anna and dies from the bite. Anna attempts to bite Valerie too, but succumbs to the cold as Tom Bailey smashes the window from outside; Anna dies in the fire. Harry and Tom arrive and save Valerie. The three escape safely and watch as the house is consumed by the flames.

== Cast ==
- Ray Barrett as Harry George Spalding
- Jennifer Daniel as Valerie Spalding
- Michael Ripper as Tom Bailey
- Noel Willman as Dr Franklyn
- Jacqueline Pearce as Anna Franklyn
- John Laurie as Mad Peter
- Marne Maitland as Malay
- David Baron as Charles Edward Spalding
- Charles Lloyd-Pack as the vicar
- Harold Goldblatt as the solicitor
- George Woodbridge as Old Garnsey

== Production ==
Initially pitched to Universal Pictures three years earlier as The Curse of the Reptiles, the script was written by Anthony Hinds using his pseudonym, John Elder. Hammer producer Anthony Nelson Keys, in an effort to save money, had decided to shoot four films on the same sets with staggered release dates. Three of the films, Dracula: Prince of Darkness (1966), The Plague of the Zombies (1966) and Rasputin the Mad Monk (1966) were completed before The Reptile could begin filming.

As documented in books on Hammer Film's history, actress Jacqueline Pearce disliked wearing the Reptile make-up as she suffered from claustrophobia. After this film she vowed never to wear "creature" make-up in her future acting projects.

== Release ==
The film was released in some markets on a double feature with Rasputin, the Mad Monk, opening on this bill in England on 20 February 1966.

A novelization of the film was written by John Burke as part of his 1967 book The Second Hammer Horror Film Omnibus.

=== Home media ===
Anchor Bay Entertainment released The Reptile on DVD on 2 November 1999. StudioCanal released a Blu-ray and DVD edition in the United Kingdom on 18 June 2012. Scream Factory issued a North American edition on 30 July 2019.

== Reception ==
=== Critical response ===
The Hammer Story: The Authorised History of Hammer Films called the film "classic sixties Hammer". The film's lack of success caused Hammer to revert to limiting itself to more traditional horror products like Dracula Prince of Darkness which was far more successful.

AllMovie wrote, "there are some inconsistencies in Anthony Hinds' script, but the film is handsomely mounted and delivers its share of shocks".

Time Out wrote, "it's slower and moodier than its companion-piece (Plague of the Zombies), but strikingly Conan Doyle-ish in its stately costume horrors. Jacqueline Pearce is terrific".

British Horror Films said, "it's superb".

The Monthly Film Bulletin wrote that it "has an unusually controlled dignity for a Hammer production; instead of the customary blood-lettings, we are invited to observe with nervous curiosity the slow self-destruction of a proud but superstitious man incapable of rescuing his daughter from the fate half-wished upon her by himself ... Altogether, a film of quite some merit."

Kevin Thomas of the Los Angeles Times wrote that "the script is too silly for all but the most uncritical."

== In other media ==
The Reptile was adapted into a 12-page comics story by Steve Moore and Brian Lewis, which was published in Hammer's House of Horror #19, published in April 1978 by Top Sellers Ltd.
