= Colin Cant =

British television director and producer

Colin Cant is a British television director, producer and scenic designer, best known for his work for the children's department of BBC Television from the 1970s to the 1990s. After beginning his career as a designer, he moved to directing and worked on many BBC children's series. He was involved for several years as both a director and producer on the long-running school-based drama series Grange Hill. He remained active in television into the 21st century, directing for the ITV soap opera Coronation Street in 2005.

Colin lives in Ealing with his wife, Fiona. They are active members of West Middlesex Tennis Club.

== Career ==
Cant initially trained as an architect, but switched to working in television design after watching a documentary programme about it, and realising how much more quickly his work could be realised in that area as opposed to the longer construction time of architecture. He began his career in television in the 1960s, earning his earliest credits as a scenic designer on programmes such as the BBC Scotland series This Man Craig. He was encouraged by one of his colleagues there, future film director Ridley Scott, to make the move into directing. His first directing work came on Coronation Street in 1971; he had written an on-spec letter to the soap opera's production team pitching for directing work, which happened to coincide with new directors being needed for the programme.

Cant was the first ever director on Grange Hill in 1978, and was responsible for much of the original casting for the programme. Cant's work on Grange Hill saw him awarded - jointly with Anna Home - a British Academy Television Award (BAFTA) in 1979. He also received two further BAFTA nominations for his work on the series, in 1981 and 1982.

Cant also directed several stand-alone children's drama serials and literary adaptations, including Moonfleet (1984), Moondial (1988), Dark Season (1991) and Century Falls (1993). The latter pair of serials were two of the earliest works from the writer Russell T Davies, who went on to have a distinguished career in British television drama. Cant had specifically asked Davies for a new serial after having been impressed with his work on Dark Season, as he had been commissioned to direct a serial by another writer with whom he was not impressed, and asked if Davies could come up with something better instead. In Dark Season, Cant had cast future Academy Award winner Kate Winslet in one of her first leading roles on screen.

Cant also worked in adult television, including three stints as a director on Coronation Street; in 1971–72, 1995–96 and 2000–05. He also directed episodes of the police drama Juliet Bravo, legal drama Crown Court and another ITV soap opera, Emmerdale.
