= Mary Wimbush =

English actress (1924–2005)

- Wimbush in Jeeves and Wooster (1992)
- Born: 19 March 1924; Kenton, Middlesex, England
- Died: 31 October 2005 (aged 81); Birmingham, West Midlands, England
- Education: Royal Central School of Speech and Drama
- Occupation: Actress
- Years active: 1945–2005
- Spouse: Howard Marion-Crawford (m. 1946; div. 1954)
- Children: 1

Mary Wimbush (19 March 1924 – 31 October 2005) was an English actress whose career spanned sixty years.

Active across film, television, theatre and radio, she was nominated for the BAFTA Award for Best Supporting Actress for the 1969 film Oh! What a Lovely War. Her television credits included Poldark (1975–77), Jeeves and Wooster (1990–92), and Century Falls (1993). She played Julia Pargetter in BBC Radio 4's popular soap opera The Archers from 1992 until her death.

== Early life and education ==
Wimbush was born on 19 March 1924 in Kenton, Middlesex (today in North-West London). Her father was a schoolmaster and her mother had trained at RADA, but did not pursue a stage career, although the family enjoyed taking part in amateur dramatics. They moved to Berkhamsted, Hertfordshire, when Mary was four.

Wimbush was educated at Berkhamsted School for Girls, and at St Agnes & St Michael's Convent, an Anglican school in East Grinstead. She trained at the Central School of Speech and Drama, before joining the Amersham repertory company.

== Career ==
In 1959 Wimbush acted in a radio play opposite Richard Attenborough. She later appeared in two other films, Fragment of Fear (1970) and Vampire Circus (1972). On television, she appeared in a variety of series in supporting roles. She played Prudie Paynter in the BBC's adaptations of the Poldark novels in the 1970s, and Zasulich in 1974's Fall of Eagles. In the 1980s she appeared in the Doctor Who spin-off K-9 and Company and D.H. Lawrence adaptation Sons and Lovers (both 1981), and in the early 1990s as Aunt Agatha in three series of Jeeves and Wooster, with Stephen Fry and Hugh Laurie.

In 1993 she co-starred in the dark children's fantasy serial Century Falls. She also had guest appearances in episodes of a variety of programmes during her career, from Z-Cars and All Creatures Great and Small (in the episode "A Dog's Life") in the 1970s to Midsomer Murders, Heartbeat and Doctors in the 2000s. Her final screen appearance was in a two-part episode of the BBC One medical drama Casualty in September 2004.

== Death ==
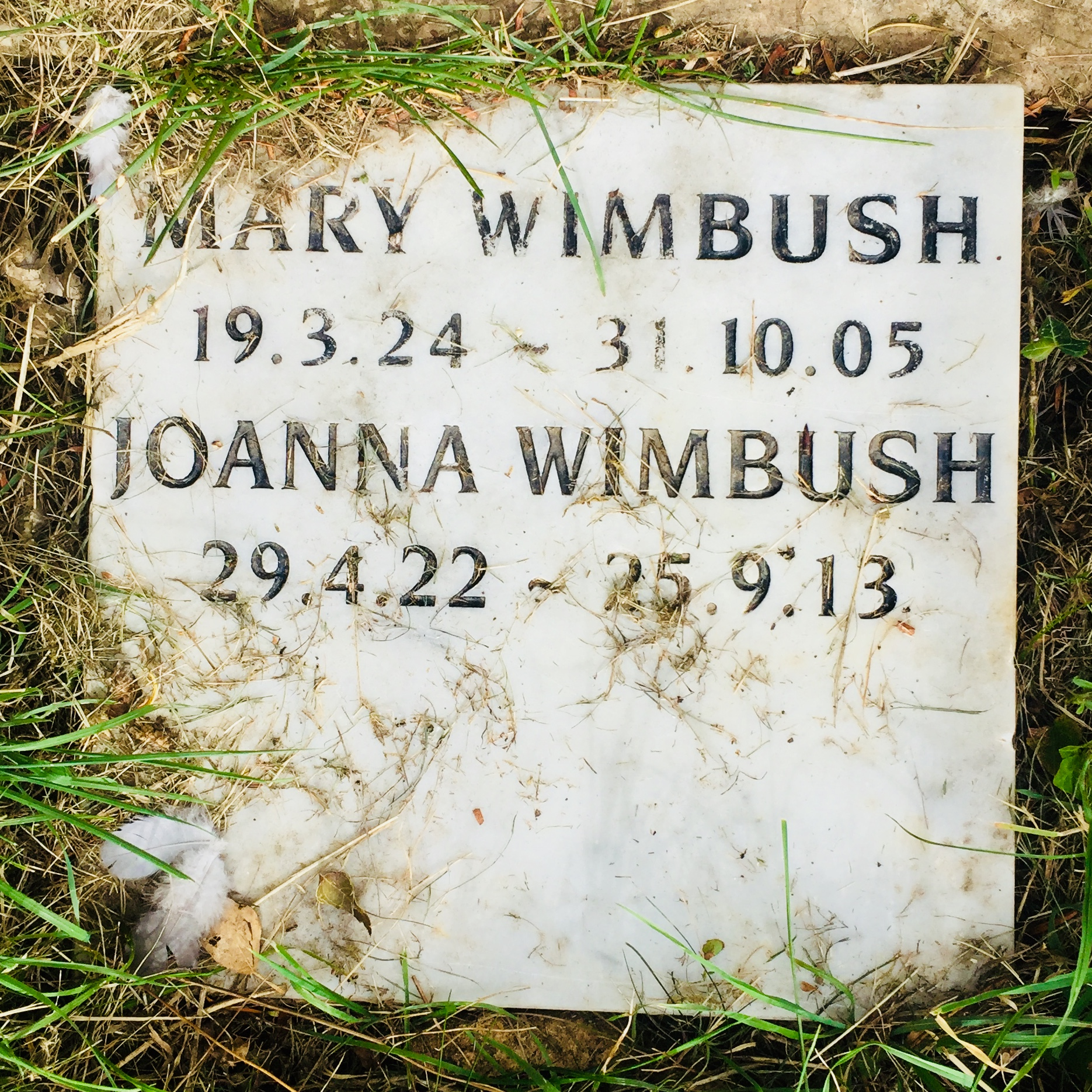
Wimbush's grave in Rectory Lane Cemetery, Berkhamsted, Hertfordshire

Wimbush died on the evening of 31 October 2005 at the Mailbox studios of BBC Birmingham, shortly after completing work on a recording session for The Archers.

Wimbush was buried in Berkhamsted next to the graves of her parents in Rectory Lane Cemetery. Mary's elder sister, Joanna, was also buried there in 2013.

== Personal life ==
In 1946 Mary Wimbush married actor Howard Marion-Crawford; they had one son and two grandchildren. From 1960 until his death in 1963, she was in a relationship with the poet Louis MacNeice, having acted in several of his radio plays.

== Filmography ==
Year	Title	Role	Notes
1969	Oh! What a Lovely War	Mary Emma Smith	
1970	Fragment of Fear	'Bunface'	
1972	Vampire Circus	Elvira	

== Sources ==
- "Archers star Wimbush dies at 81". BBC News. 1 November 2005.
- "Mary Wimbush at 80". BBC. 26 March 2004.
- Smethurst, William (1980). The Archers: The First Thirty Years. Eyre Methuen/New English Library. ISBN 978-0-450-05220-0.
