= Carolina Tiger Rescue =

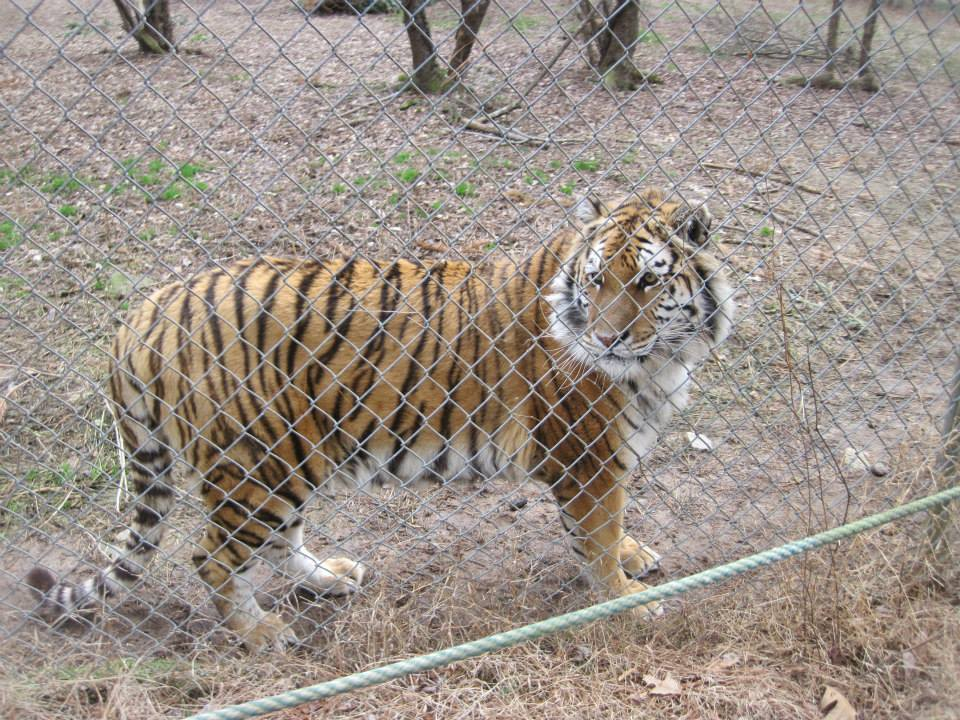
- Interactive map of Carolina Tiger Rescue
- Date opened: 1973 (Official)
- Location: Pittsboro, North Carolina, United States
- Land area: 67 acres (27 ha)
- Website: www.carolinatigerrescue.org

Carolina Tiger Rescue is a nonprofit wildcat sanctuary in Pittsboro, North Carolina, that offers public tours and field trips and is home to rescued tigers, lions, cougars, leopards, caracals, servals, bobcats and other wild animals. Over 20,000 visitors come to the sanctuary each year for guided tours, field trips, summer camps, volunteering and corporate work groups. Their mission is saving and protecting wild cats in captivity and in the wild. They work toward a day when wild cats are living in their native habitat and are not exploited by humans. Carolina Tiger Rescue is Global Federation of Animal Sanctuaries (GFAS) and USDA accredited. The Executive Director is Kris Marino.

== History ==
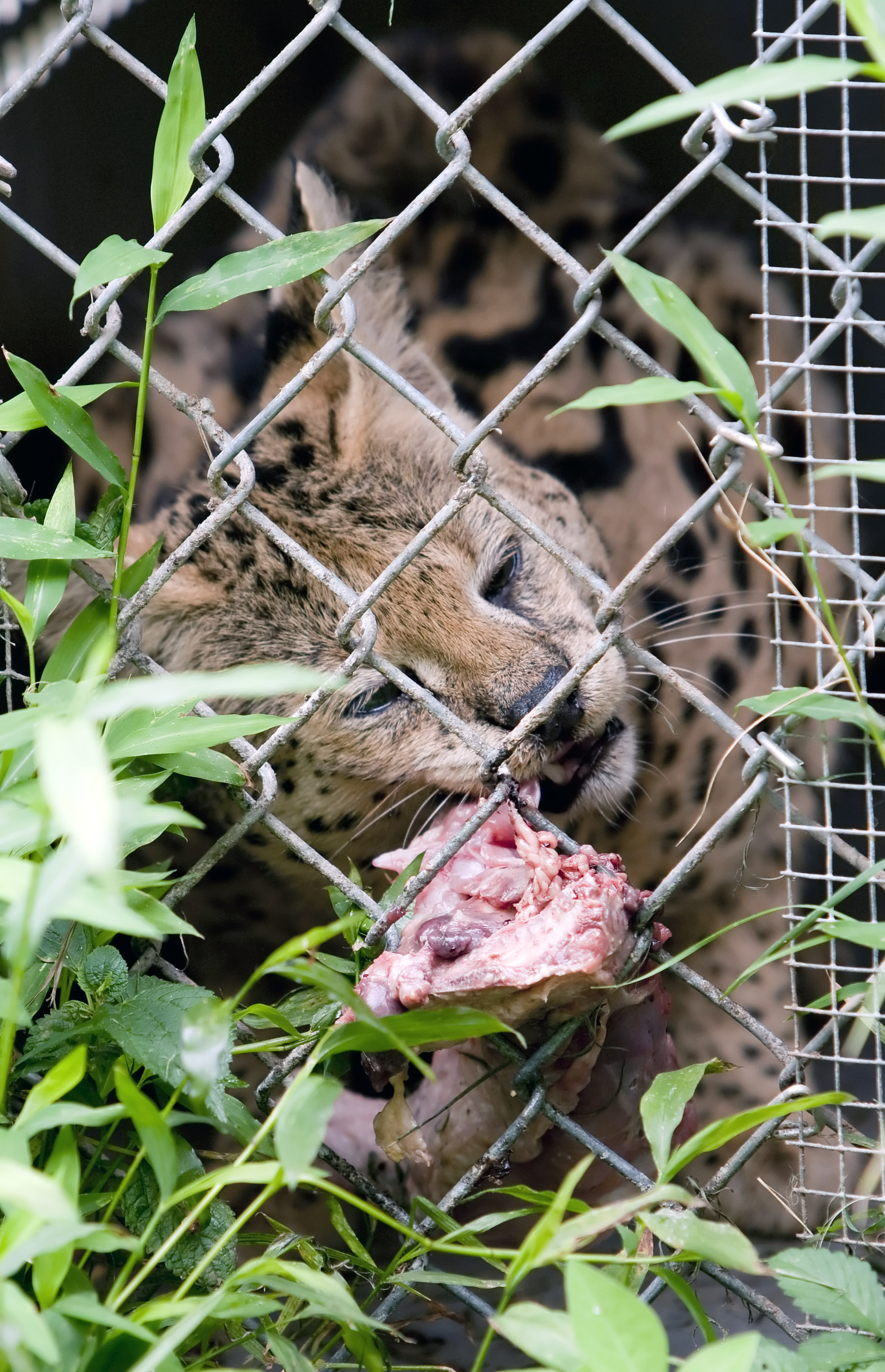
Carnivore Preservation Trust in 2009

Carolina Tiger Rescue was founded as The Carnivore Evolutionary Research Institute in 1973 by Dr. Michael Bleyman, a geneticist at UNC, as a research facility for carnivores that were vanishing keystone species — species critical to the survival of their ecosystem. Bleyman's intent was to keep a viable population of these animals in trust until their home habitats were sufficiently protected to support them again.

The Carnivore Evolutionary Research Institute was incorporated in 1981, and changed its name to Carnivore Preservation Trust (CPT). CPT became well known for its success in breeding certain species, particularly servals, ocelots, and binturongs.

As the environmental community began to appreciate the plight of these lesser-known carnivores, they began to create species survival plans – organized plans for the survival of the species, including a national genetic registry to monitor numbers and breeding. In response, Carnivore Preservation Trust stopped breeding wildcats in 2000, and changed its name to Carolina Tiger Rescue in 2009, refocusing its mission to rescue.

== Rescues ==
Aria was rescued in May 2013, when she was confiscated by the authorities from a family in South Carolina who had kept her as a pet. Aria was about 10 years old and near death. Although she was eating, she had lost weight very rapidly. When she arrived at Carolina Tiger Rescue, she weighed under 200 pounds, about half of what she should have weighed. Within a few months of receiving veterinary intervention, a healthy diet, and proper care, Aria became a healthy tiger.

Rajah and Kaela Tiger were found wandering a rural county road near Charlotte, North Carolina when they were about six months old.

Nitro was a blind tiger who arrived at Carolina Tiger Rescue in 2009, with his enclosure-mate Apache. They had been rescued from a junkyard in Kansas after a lion there attacked a man. The three lions were relocated to the Detroit Zoo, and the search began for a home for the owner's two tigers. Luckily, Carolina Tiger Rescue could take them in. National Geographic Kids wrote a book featuring Nitro.

== Educational Program ==
Carolina Tiger Rescue has a robust educational program and offers educational tours, school field trips, homeschool programs, preschool storytime, group presentations, and internships. One of Carolina Tiger Rescue’s main goals is educating the public on the dangers of private exotic cat ownership, circuses and wild animal exploitation. Another goal is preserving wild animals in their natural habitats by exposing the dangers of palm oil and its effects on tiger habitat. Summer animal care internships are available for college students.

== Safety ==
Carolina Tiger Rescue is a no-touch facility and meets USDA and US Fish and Wildlife standards for a big cat sanctuary. Guests must be escorted around the sanctuary by a staff member and are kept at least three feet away from the animal enclosures. Employees or trained volunteers may briefly enter lower level enclosures housing animals like caracals for cleaning and maintenance, but are careful not to interact with these wild animals. All employees and volunteers receive extensive training before they can interact with the animals or enter any enclosure.

== Partnerships ==
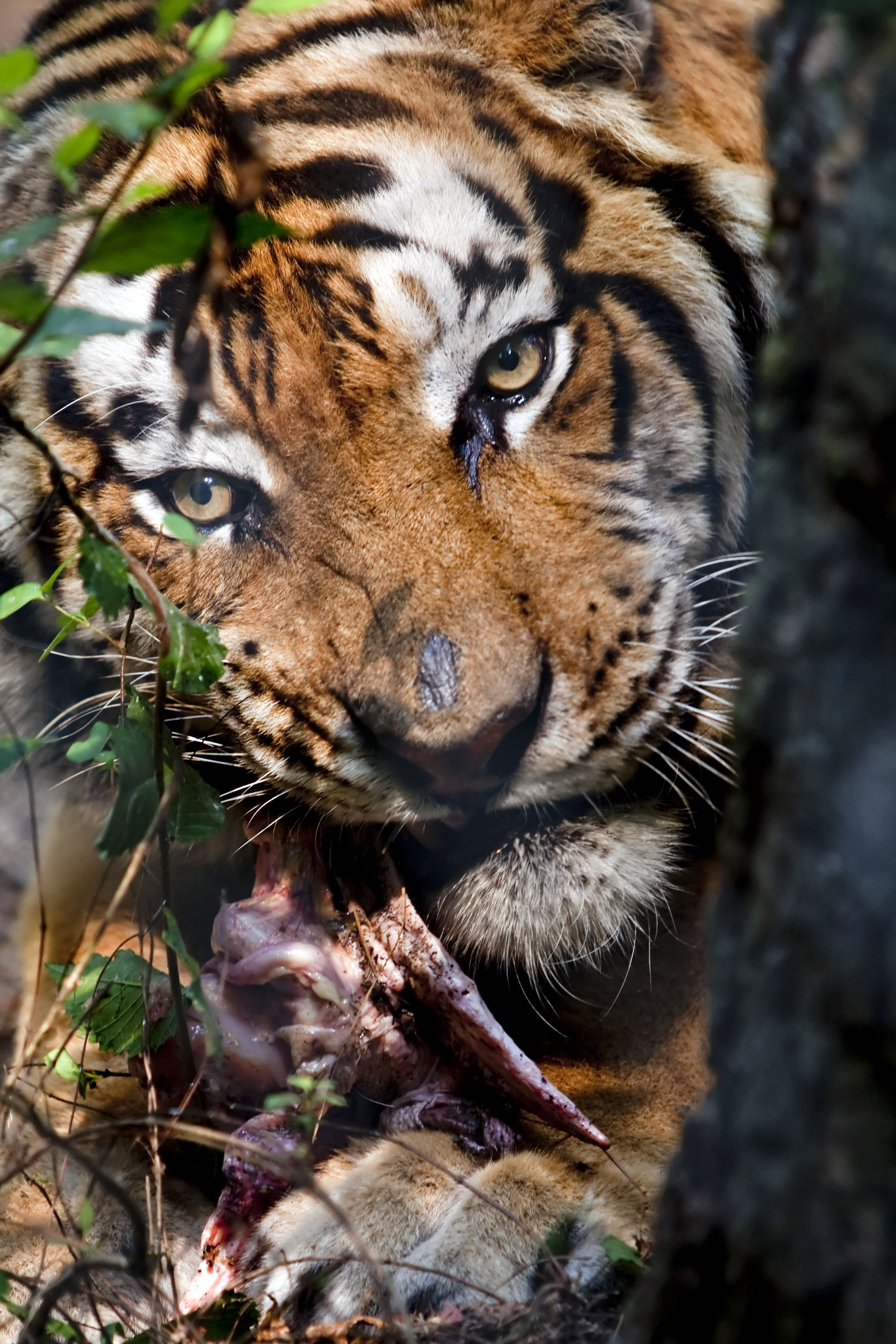

Carolina Tiger engages in a variety of partnerships with the academia/research, environmental, and sanctuary and zoo communities, as well as the corporate world. For almost two decades, Carolina Tiger has provided access to our tigers’ footprints to collect baseline data for the WildTrack Noninvasive Wildlife Monitoring Project. Carolina Tiger was a founding member of the Big Cat Sanctuary Alliance (BCSA) in 2017. BCSA membership is limited to bona fide facilities that meet the federal definition for a wildlife sanctuary. The Alliance is dedicated to eliminating private ownership and the commercial exploitation of wild cats in the US. Carolina Tiger staff also participate in the local American Association of Zoo Keepers (AAZK). Some funding comes from employee donations through workplace giving campaigns via Earth Share of North Carolina.

== Controversy ==
Sherry Blanchette, owner of a wildlife sanctuary, went under cover with the BBC posing as a veterinarian and toured the CPT in 2000. She later wrote a report to the USDA and county officials, saying that the facility was unsafe because of vegetation on cages, rusting feed bins, and inadequate, rusting fencing. CPT officials refuted those claims.

In 1998, Mark Kostich, a CPT volunteer, was mauled by a cougar while cleaning cages and he later sued CPT. In Kostich's lawsuit, Sherry Blanchette was called as an expert witness on cougar behavior.

The North Carolina legislature considered an unsuccessful bill in 2004 which would make it illegal for individuals and over thirty other nonprofit zoological entities to own many of the animals housed at the Carolina Tiger Rescue. Carolina Tiger Rescue supported this bill.

== Accreditations ==
Carolina Tiger Rescue is rated as a Platinum-level participant by Guidestar and Great Nonprofits has named them a top nonprofit since 2018. Carolina Tiger Rescue is Global Federation of Animal Sanctuaries (GFAS) and USDA accredited.
