= Bat World Sanctuary =

Worldwide rescue center based in Texas

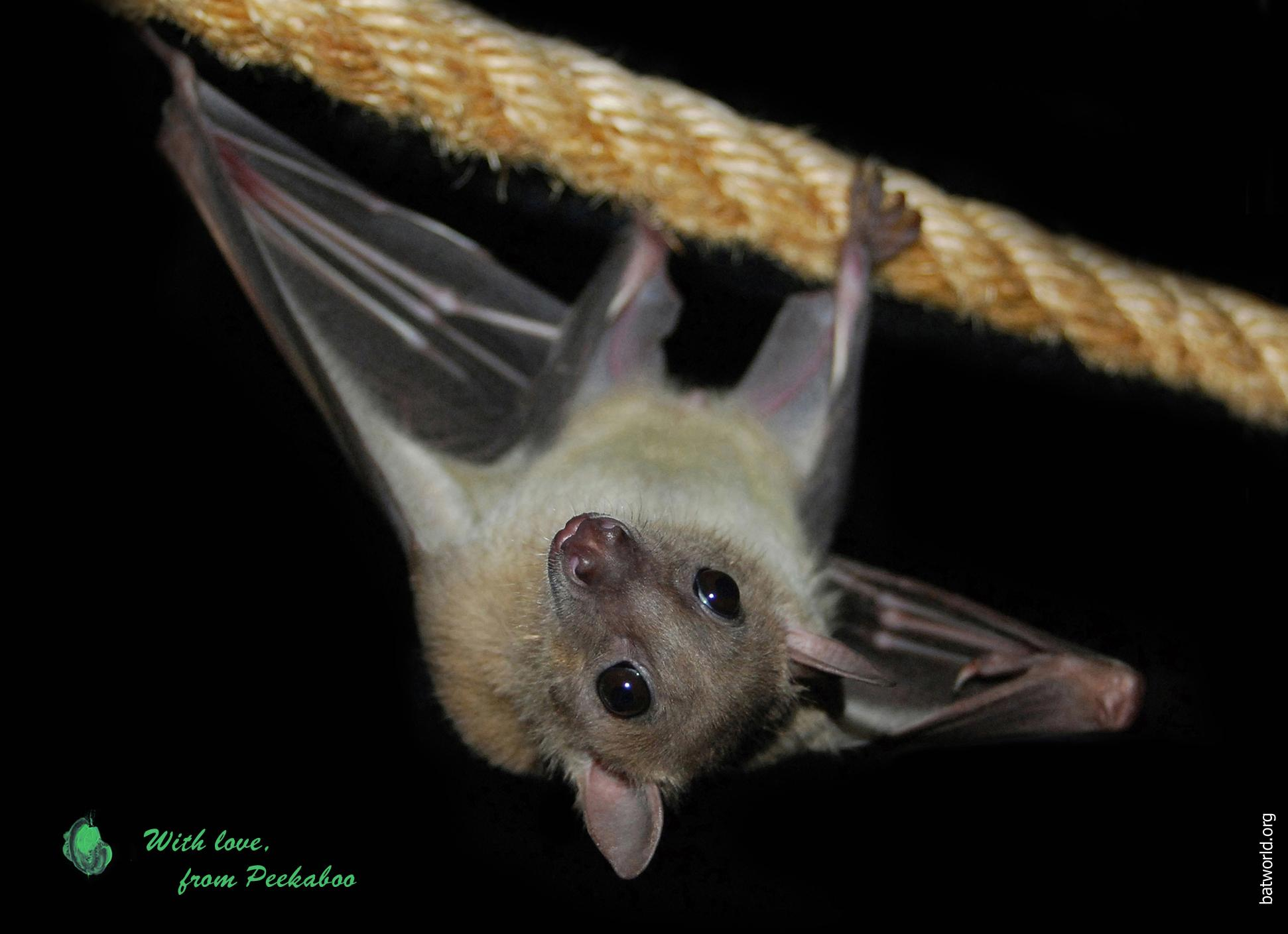
- A bat named Peekaboo at Bat World Sanctuary
- Formation: 1994
- Founder: Amanda Lollar
- Founded at: Mineral Wells, Texas
- Type: Nonprofit organization
- Registration no.: 75-2503642
- Headquarters: 299 High Point Rd
- Location: Weatherford, Texas, United States
- Coordinates: 32°48′24.52″N 98°1′58.99″W
- Website: https://batworld.org/

Bat World Sanctuary was founded in 1994 as a non-profit rescue-rehabilitation center and sanctuary operated exclusively for bats. Based in North Texas with rescue centers around the world, the organization is "dedicated to educating the community about bats to dispel myths and encourage conservation as well as providing rescue efforts for the species". It is one of several bat conservation organizations active in the United States and has been described as "the largest bat rescue center on the planet."

== History ==
The founder of Bat World Sanctuary, Amanda Lollar, was inspired to start the organization in 1988, when she discovered an injured Mexican free-tailed bat on her way to the bank. She put it in a box with food and water so that it could die a peaceful death, but the bat recovered and lived for another two-and-a-half years. Lollar named the bat "Sunshine," and sometimes refers to the sanctuary as "Sunshine's legacy." In 1995, Lollar published The Bat in my Pocket: A Memorable Friendship, a book about her experiences with Sunshine and Bat World Sanctuary.

The original Bat World Sanctuary was created in a historic retail building in downtown Mineral Wells, Texas. In 1992, a wild sanctuary was started just a block away from the Bat World facility. It was sited in a two-story apartment building that was built in 1899, and had been vacant for years. Lollar purchased the building when she heard that the owner was selling it and planned to exterminate residing bats as part of the process. The hand-hewn sandstone construction of the building had crumbled over time, leaving cracks and openings ideal for bats to inhabit. Two years later, in 1994, the sanctuary for non-releasable bats was officially founded as a non-profit organization.

Bat World Sanctuary is accredited with both the Global Federation of Animal Sanctuaries and the American Sanctuary Association. In 2016, Lollar received The Carol Noon Award for Sanctuary Excellence.

In June 2012, Bat World Sanctuary was awarded 6.1 million dollars in damages in its defamation lawsuit against a former intern. In April 2015, the Second Court of Appeals upheld the Judgement against the intern.

== Research and impact ==
Bat World Sanctuary has been described as "the largest bat rescue center on the planet," with an estimated 100,000 Mexican free-tails inhabiting the wild sanctuary, plus a seasonal maternity colony of about 20,000 females who move in each spring. The Bat World Sanctuary facility holds about 400 non-releasable bats who live there permanently.

There is a clinic inside Bat World Sanctuary that serves as a rehabilitation center for sick or injured bats. It is a simulated natural habitat with different features that cater to specific types of bat in order to lower the stresses that bats experience from being captive. Annually, as many as 1,500 rehabilitated bats are released back to the wild.

Lollar and the staff at the sanctuary have also launched a bat house project, where they would remove unwanted bats from local buildings free of charge as long as the building owners agreed to hang bat houses close to where the bats formerly entered the buildings. The bat houses were also provided for free through the program.

Observations by Bat World Sanctuary Founder Amanda Lollar and Bat Conservation International led researchers at the University of Texas at Austin and Texas A&M University to conclude that male bats create songs to attract females and warn other males to stay away. The sanctuary has also hosted a colony of bats to assist with research conducted at the University of Colorado Denver, and has assisted scientists at Cornell University in the study of acoustic mimicry of visual warning signals by echolocating bats.
