= The Children (1990 film) =

1990 film by Tony Palmer

- Theatrical release poster
- Directed by: Tony Palmer
- Written by: Timberlake Wertenbaker
- Based on: The Children by Edith Wharton
- Produced by: Karin Bamborough; Maureen Murray; Georg Bogner; Harold Albrecht; Arno Ortmair; Andrew Montgomery; Monika Aubele
- Starring: Ben Kingsley; Kim Novak; Siri Neal; Geraldine Chaplin
- Cinematography: Nicholas D. Knowland
- Edited by: Tony Palmer
- Music by: Evelyn Glennie
- Release date: 1990 (London Film Festival)
- Running time: 115 minutes
- Countries: United Kingdom; West Germany
- Language: English

The Children is a 1990 British–German drama film directed by Tony Palmer and starring Ben Kingsley, Kim Novak and Britt Ekland. It is based on the 1928 novel by Edith Wharton.

== Cast ==
- Ben Kingsley as Martin Boyne
- Kim Novak as Rose Sellars
- Britt Ekland as Lady Zinnia Wrench
- Donald Sinden as Lord Wrench
- Geraldine Chaplin as Joyce Wheater
- Joe Don Baker as Cliffe Wheater
- Siri Neal as Judith
- Karen Black as Sybil Lullmer
- Robert Stephens as Azariah Dobree
- Rupert Graves as Gerald Ormerod
- Terence Rigby as Duke of Mendip
- Marie Helvin as Princess Buondelmonte
- Rosemary Leach as Miss Scope
- Mark Asquith as Terry
- Ian Hawkes as Bun
- Anouk Fontaine as Blanca
- Eileen Hawkes as Beechy
- Hermione Eyre as Zinnie
- Edward Michie as Chip

== Release ==
The film premiered at the London Film Festival and received good reviews. Leonard Maltin praised the acting and felt Novak's performance was "excellent". However, following disputes between director Tony Palmer and the distributor over editing and music, the film was pulled from release and never distributed.

== See also ==
- The Marriage Playground (1929)
