= Heart of Empire =

Graphic novel series

- Heart of Empire #1 (April 1999)

Publication information
- Publisher: Dark Horse Comics
- Schedule: Monthly
- Format: Limited series
- Publication date: Apr. – Dec. 1999
- No. of issues: 9
- Main character: Luther Arkwright

Creative team
- Created by: Bryan Talbot
- Written by: Bryan Talbot
- Artist: Bryan Talbot
- Letterer: Ellie de Ville
- Colorist: Angus McKie
- Editor: Randy Stradley

Collected editions
- Heart of Empire: The Legacy of Luther Arkwright: ISBN 1-56971-567-X

Heart of Empire or The Legacy of Luther Arkwright is a science fiction comics limited series by British artist Bryan Talbot, published in nine monthly parts in 1999 by American company Dark Horse Comics.

It is a sequel to his earlier work The Adventures of Luther Arkwright, set twenty-three years later, and centres on Arkwright's daughter Victoria.

== Overview ==
While the earlier work was highly experimental in its storytelling, with flashbacks and other multiple storylines running at different speeds and told in different styles, only resolving into a single narrative in the later part of the book, Heart of Empire is straightforwardly linear and drawn in a consistent style, with computer colouring by Angus McKie and lettering by Ellie DeVille. The pacing of the story is made more natural by the decision to vary the page count of the monthly comics to fit the demands of the storytelling. The story is nevertheless full of mythological, historical, artistic and political references, symbolism, and subliminal imagery. Many events echo those in The Adventures of Luther Arkwright.

As well as a collected paperback edition, Heart of Empire is available as a CD-ROM containing scans of the pencil roughs, black-and-white inks, final colour pages and high-resolution versions and a great deal of annotation and supplementary material from Talbot. It also includes scans of the whole of The Adventures of Luther Arkwright, from the recently created digital remastered version at the best resolution that it has ever been seen in.

A collected trade paperback edition, titled Heart of Empire: The Legacy of Luther Arkwright, was published by Dark Horse in 2001.

A third story, The Legend of Luther Arkwright, was published in July 2022 by Jonathan Cape.

== Synopsis ==
The story is largely set on the same parallel on which the key events of Luther Arkwright occurred. Twenty-three years have passed (putting the date of the events at 2007), and England has emerged from its artificially prolonged Civil War to become the predominant world power under the autocratic rule of its psychic Queen Anne. The decadent court exhibits a mixture of Elizabethan, Restoration and Victorian styles. Ordinary people randomly "disappear" to an unknown fate in St. George's Chapel, Windsor at Windsor Castle.

Anne's only heir is Princess Victoria, her daughter by the long-vanished Luther Arkwright, born during the climactic battle twenty-three years earlier. Victoria is an engineering genius, but suffers constantly from nausea and headaches. Victoria's twin brother Henry was assassinated at the age of ten, but when Victoria is told she resembles the revolutionary leader Gabriel Shelley, she becomes fascinated by the possibility that he is her brother, and starts a quest to learn about the circumstances of Henry's death. Meanwhile, both a Papal Envoy and a group of fascists within the government plan to assassinate Anne and Victoria in order to seize the Empire for the Roman Catholic Church and themselves, respectively. Furthermore, the advanced society of parallel "zero-zero" has detected an imminent cataclysm centred on Victoria's world, and tries in vain to contact Luther.

Gabriel Shelley is not Henry, but Victoria's contact with him helps open her eyes to the oppressive nature of her mother's empire. It also opens her eyes in other ways, as she accidentally takes a hallucinogen instead of a migraine remedy from his collection of homemade medicines. Under the influence of the potion, she makes her first jump across the parallels to meet her father. They return to Victoria's world to defeat the true Heart of Empire and source of the imminent catastrophe - a psychic monster lurking in St George's Chapel, created by Anne's attempts to keep her son Henry alive. Anne is mortally wounded in combat with the Papal Envoy, and Victoria intervenes decisively to stop a massacre of democracy campaigners and kill the fascist ringleaders. In the final scene, she abdicates the throne and dissolves the Empire.

== In other media ==
=== Audio adaptation ===
Heart of Empire

Big Finish Productions audio drama
- Series: Luther Arkwright
- Release no.: 2
- Featuring: David Tennant, India Fisher, Siri O'Neal, Jez Fielder, Georgina Hellier
- Written by: Bryan Talbot, adapted by Mark Wright
- Directed by: Scott Handcock & Jason Haigh-Ellery
- Produced by: Heather Challands
- Executive producers: Nicholas Briggs & Jason Haigh-Ellery
- Production code: BFPLACD02
- Length: 2 hrs 35 min
- Release date: 7 September 2023

In 2023, Heart of Empire was made into a full-cast, two-CD audio adventure by Big Finish Productions, with David Tennant, India Fisher, Jez Fielder, Robert Jezek and Siri O'Neal returning from their adaptation of The Adventures of Luther Arkwright.

==== Cast ====
- Luther Arkwright — David Tennant
- Harry Fairfax / Dr John Dee — Jez Fielder
- Queen Anne — India Fisher
- Gabriel Shelley — Ahmed Hamad
- Victoria — Georgina Hellier
- Stanley — George Howard
- Karl — Robert Jezek
- Rose — Siri O'Neal
- Northumberland — Emma Williams
- Nurse / Lady in Waiting — Lizzie Worsdell
