= Century Falls =

British television series

- Century Falls DVD Cover, showing from left to right Tess Hunter, Ben and Carey Naismith
- Created by: Russell T Davies
- Directed by: Colin Cant
- Starring: Bernard Kay; Marc Sinden; Mary Wimbush; Catherine Sanderson; Tatiana Strauss; Beryl Cooke; Georgine Anderson; Heather Baskerville; Simon Fenton; Emma Jane Lavin; Eileen Way
- Country of origin: United Kingdom
- Original language: English
- No. of episodes: 6

Production
- Producer: Richard Callanan
- Running time: 25 minutes

Original release
- Network: BBC1
- Release: 17 February – 24 March 1993

Century Falls is a British hybrid genre miniseries broadcast in six twenty-five-minute episodes on BBC1 in early 1993. Written by Russell T Davies, it tells the story of teenager Tess Hunter and her mother, who move to the seemingly idyllic rural village of Century Falls, only to find that it hides many powerful secrets.

== Background ==
Russell T Davies had worked in the BBC Children's Department for many years, writing the science-fiction series Dark Season for the weekday afternoon Children's BBC strand in 1991. The following year, he had left the BBC to work for Granada Television, where he was producing and writing for their children's medical drama Children's Ward.

The director of Dark Season, Colin Cant, had been assigned to direct another children's series for BBC1, but had little enthusiasm for the script. Instead, he wrote to Davies asking if he could provide something else. Davies quickly wrote the first episode of Century Falls for Cant to take to his superiors, who then fully commissioned the programme.

The production was shot entirely on location around Richmond, Langthwaite, Muker and locations around the northern Yorkshire Dales. The waterfall of Century Falls was actually Gibson's Cave, just north of Bowlees.

The series was broadcast as part of Children's BBC on BBC1 on Wednesday afternoons at 5:10 pm from 17 February to 24 March 1993. Each episode was repeated on BBC2 the Sunday morning after transmission.

Century Falls was released on DVD by 2|entertain Ltd on 24 July 2006. Upon release, it received a British Board of Film Classification rating of PG.

== Plot ==
When Tess Hunter and her mother arrive in Century Falls, they gradually find it to be a strange village, haunted by a disaster that befell it during the performance of an occult ceremony forty years earlier.

Tess befriends the only other children in the village, brother and sister Ben and Carey Naismith, and finds that Ben has strange powers which he draws from the waterfall that gives the village its name.

The Naismiths' uncle Richard is working with his aged father, Dr Josiah Naismith, to complete the unfinished ceremony using Ben's powers, hoping to raise the spirit of a mysterious God-like being, Century. They are eventually stopped by Tess's actions, aided by the local Harkness sisters, who knew the original tragedy of the 1950s events.

== Cast and crew ==
Russell T Davies had already gained a good reputation from his work on Dark Season and Children's Ward. He later went on to forge a career as one of Britain's top writers of television drama, although he did not write again for the BBC until he penned an episode of Linda Green, transmitted on BBC One in 2001. Davies became the chief writer of the revival of Doctor Who in 2005, for which he won several awards, including a BAFTA for Best Drama.

Colin Cant had, for many years, been the Producer of the BBC's long-running school drama Grange Hill, and had directed several well-received children's series before Century Falls, such as Moondial (1990) and Dark Season.

Of the cast, the three teenage leads were unknown: Catherine Sanderson as Tess, Simon Fenton as Ben, and Emma Jane Lavin as Carey. Simon Fenton has since gone on to appear in several well-known television dramas, such as ITV's police soap opera The Bill (in 2002) and Steven Spielberg's Band of Brothers (2001).

Many of the adult cast were already well-known character actors from a range of British television dramas. Bernard Kay (Richard Naismith) had appeared in episodes of many long-running British television dramas, such as Doctor Who, Crossroads, Dixon of Dock Green and Z-Cars, as well as films such as Carry On Sergeant (1958) and Doctor Zhivago (1965). Mary Wimbush (Esme Harkness) appeared in the BBC's famous adaptation of Poldark (1975) and several episodes of ITV's Jeeves and Wooster (1990–1992). She was probably best known, however, as the voice of Julia Pargetter in BBC Radio 4's long-running rural soap opera The Archers.
