= Siri Neal =

British actress

- Born: Siri Willow Ceridwen Neal; 14 August 1972 (age 54); Carmarthen, Carmarthenshire, Wales
- Other name: Siri O'Neal
- Occupation: Actress
- Years active: 1988–1998

Siri Willow Ceridwen Neal, sometimes credited as Siri O'Neal, is a film and television actress. She is best known for appearing as Minty, the lead role in Moondial (1988).

== Career ==
Born Siri Willow Ceridwen Neal, Neal's grandmother's surname was O'Neal. Her mother altered it to "Neal". Since 1996 Neal has also used "O'Neal".

She is best known for appearing as Minty, the lead role in Moondial (1988), a children's television series originally aired on the BBC.

Neal also appeared as Juanita, a guerilla leader/French double agent, in the television film Sharpe's Battle (1995), a part of the multi-part drama series Sharpe. She also guest starred in two episodes of the TV drama Lovejoy: "Highland Fling Part 1" and "Highland Fling Part 2".

Her last credited role was as a social worker in the film Urban Ghost Story (1998).

Since then, Neal has worked on various audiobooks, including the Doctor Who spin off UNIT (2004) alongside David Tennant.

Neal has also provided TV/radio voiceovers for Argos, Clover, Nescafe, Powergen, Sainsburys, Channel 4, Jazz FM & Homelessness.

== Filmography ==
=== Film ===
Year	Title	Role	Notes
1989	The Rachel Papers	Suki	
1990	The Children	Judith	
1992	Waterland	Helen Atkinson	
1998	Urban Ghost Story	Social worker	as Siri O'Neal

=== Television ===
Year	Title	Role	Notes
1988	Moondial	Araminta 'Minty' Cane	6 episodes
1989	Summer's Lease		2 episodes
1990	Press Gang	Charlotte	Episode: "Breakfast at Czar's"
1990	Alleyn Mysteries	Sonia Gluck	Episode: "Artists in crime"
1992	The Cloning of Joanna May	Bethany	
1992	Lovejoy	Sandra Wilson	2 episodes
1993	Stay Lucky	Linda	Episode: "Gilding the lily"
1993	Jackanory	Storyteller	Episode: "Florizella and the Wolves"
1993	Inspector Wycliffe	Christine Glynn	Episode: "Wycliffe and the Cycle of Death"
1993	The Bill	Lizzie Hart	Episode: "You Don't Always Get What You Want"
1995	Sharpe	Juanita	Episode: "Sharpe's Battle"
2002	NCS Manhunt	Stacey Brown	Episode: "Out of Time (Part 2)" (as Siri O'Neal)

=== Theatre ===
Year	Title	Role	Notes
unknown	The Devil’s Law Case	Jolenta	Edinburgh Festival
1991/1992	The Philanderer	Sylvia	Hampstead Theatre
1992	Slip of the Tongue	Ivana	Shaftesbury Theatre
1993/1994	The Master Builder	Hilde Wangle	Royal Lyceum & Riverside Studio
1995	Tess of the D’Urbervilles	Tess	Queen’s Theatre Hornchurch
1996	The Entertainer	Jean	Hampstead & Watermill Theatre
1997	Tiger Tail	Baby Doll	Plymouth Theatre Royal
1997	Lady Windemere’s Fan	Lady Windemere	Chichester Festival Theatre
1998	The Alchemical Wedding	Joan Kelly	Salisbury Playhouse

=== Audiobooks ===
Year	Title	Role
1996	Present Laughter	
1997	Bram Stoker's Dracula	
1999	Selections from The Decameron	
2003	Doctor Who Unbound	Ruth Mills
2005	The Adventures of Luther Arkwright	Rose
2004	UNIT	Emily Chaudhry
2023	Heart of Empire	Rose
