= Wild track =

Wild track, also known as wild sound and wild lines, is an audio recording intended to be synchronized with film or video but recorded separately. Generally, the term "wild track" refers to sound recorded on the set or location of a film, such as dialogue, sound effects, or ambient or environmental noise gathered without cameras rolling. Wild tracks of dialogue are often recorded if dialogue could not be properly obtained during filming due to the presence of devices that produce noise, such as wind machines.

== See also ==
- Dubbing, wherein actors read their lines in a studio setting to match lip movements already filmed
- Voice-over, in which a voice track is used but not synchronized with onscreen action
- Foley, in which sound effects are created in a studio
- Scratch track, a temporary sound recording intended to be replaced later
