= Vervet Monkey Foundation =

South African animal sanctuary

Coordinates: 23°51′11″S 30°20′17″E

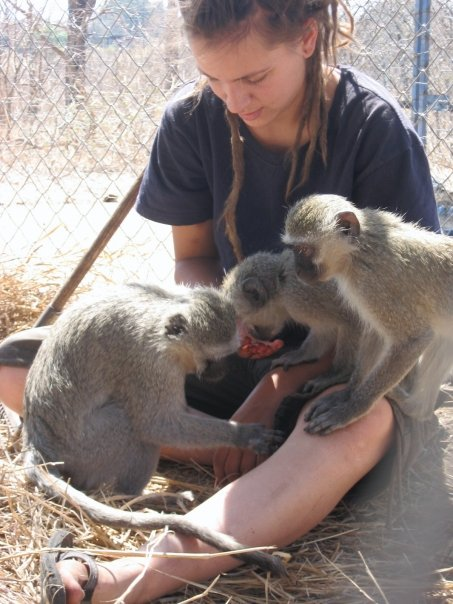
A volunteer at the Vervet Monkey Foundation working with some of the younger monkeys

The Vervet Monkey Foundation (VMF) is a 23-hectare not-for-profit centre for rehabilitation, education and sanctuary for vervet monkeys, near the town of Tzaneen, South Africa. Registered and established in 1993, it is situated approximately 80 miles south of the Tropic of Capricorn. The sanctuary is a member of the Pan African Sanctuary Alliance (PASA), and the Global Federation of Animal Sanctuaries (GFAS). The foundation relies heavily on volunteer workers primarily from western countries to assist in the day-to-day running and care duties of the foundation.

== History ==
In 1989 the first monkey, "Regus" was found orphaned, just a few hours old. He was placed in the care of Arthur Hunt and Dave Du Toit. After various legal battles, Arthur and Dave were permitted to keep Regus, and co-founded the Vervet Monkey Foundation. They began to research the possibility of rehabilitating vervet monkeys and to develop a rehabilitation programme and sanctuary where vervet monkeys in need of help would be humanely treated. The foundation has now taken over 600 monkeys into their care, including several from Medunsa University in 2002. and relies heavily on donations, sponsorship and volunteer workers from abroad.

== Aims ==
- A facility to research the life style and environment of this species.
- A program to rehabilitate orphaned and injured primates.
- A program to research the claims of damage and problems caused by vervet monkeys and offer possible solutions for co-existence.
- An education program to inform the public of the role that the vervet monkey plays in the eco system.
- A sanctuary for primates unfortunate enough to be unreleasable but, manageable enough to be used for educational purposes.

== Education and research ==
The foundation also serves as a centre to provide research and educational opportunities to students and primatologists, for example, in the field of parasitology.

The foundation has run educational workshops for local schools, in order to encourage an interest in the conservation of South Africa's indigenous wildlife.

== Rehabilitation ==
In 1998 the Vervet Monkey Foundation announced a rehabilitation programme that incorporated the use of large electrified enclosures with numerous attached smaller introduction enclosures, whereby individuals and small groups are gradually introduced to the larger established central group of that enclosure.

The rehabilitation centre is designed to handle orphaned vervet monkeys of all ages and more specifically designed to cope with large numbers of babies that become orphaned each year. Hundreds of babies have now been rescued and rehabilitated within a natural environment.

== Vervet Forest ==
Launched in 2004 by the VMF, The Vervet Forest campaign aims to protect, reclaim and restore degraded or damaged habitat through the acquisition of land for the release of rehabilitated vervet monkey troops.

By creating a rehabilitation model to incorporate the vervet monkey's proficiency as a seed dispersal expert, the monkeys will germinate and work in harmony with over 30 indigenous tree species in South Africa.

Through supporting nature's natural process of vegetation creation, both people and monkey will work together to reclaim, transform and protect degraded habitat, restoring it back into a healthy state able to support a multitude of wildlife.

The 2016 documentary, The Vervet Forest, looks at the foundation and the Vervet Forest campaign.

== Birth control ==
In 2009, The Vervet Monkey Foundation commenced a programme of vasectomies for all viable males on the foundation. This programme was completed towards the end of 2010 and the foundation is now considered to be a "non-breeding centre", in accordance with guidelines laid down by the Pan African Sanctuary Alliance.
