= Moondial (1988 serial) =

- Moondial title screen
- Created by: Helen Cresswell
- Starring: Siri Neal; Tony Sands; Jacqueline Pearce; Joanna Dunham; Valerie Lush; Arthur Hewlett; Joe York; Martin Sadler; Helena Avellano; Alison Rowley
- Country of origin: United Kingdom
- Original language: English
- No. of series: 1
- No. of episodes: 6

Production
- Running time: 25 – 28 minutes

Original release
- Network: BBC1
- Release: 10 February – 16 March 1988

Moondial is a British television six-part serial made for children by the BBC and transmitted in 1988, with a repeat in 1990. It was written by Helen Cresswell, who also wrote the 1987 novel on which the series was based.

The west entrance to Belton House near Grantham in Lincolnshire, the setting for Moondial.

== Plot ==
The story deals with a young girl, Minty (Siri Neal), staying with her aunt for the summer holidays. Minty spends much of her time wandering around the grounds of a nearby mansion, and is drawn to a moondial that enables her to travel back in time, where she becomes involved with two children, Tom (Tony Sands), who lives in the Victorian era, and Sarah (Helena Avellano), who seems to live in "the previous century" to that, and must save them from their own unhappy lives. Minty's mother, Kate, has a car accident on the way back from taking Minty to aunt Mary's, and the narrative suggests that Kate's recovery from the coma this causes is somehow connected to Minty's ability to save Tom and Sarah.

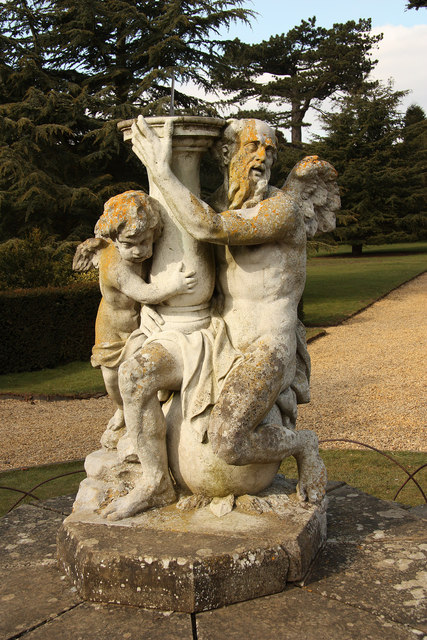
Belton House moondial

Regarded as a nostalgic favourite by followers of 1980s BBC children's drama, Moondial employs extensive location filming (in the grounds of Belton House in Lincolnshire) and fantastical, dreamlike imagery.

The series was produced by Paul Stone and directed by Colin Cant. Other cast members include Valerie Lush as Minty's Aunt Mary, Arthur Hewlett as the elderly, mysterious Mr. World, and Jacqueline Pearce in the dual role of the vicious Miss Vole (who seems to have lived in the 18th century) and the present-day ghost hunter Miss Raven.

The series was released on video in 1990, and reissued in 1995, but only in a shortened "movie edit". This was released on DVD in 2000, but has long since been out of print. The full episodic version was released in 2009 by Reader's Digest and later re-released on DVD by Second Sight in May 2015.
