= Moondial =

Timepiece based on the light of the moon

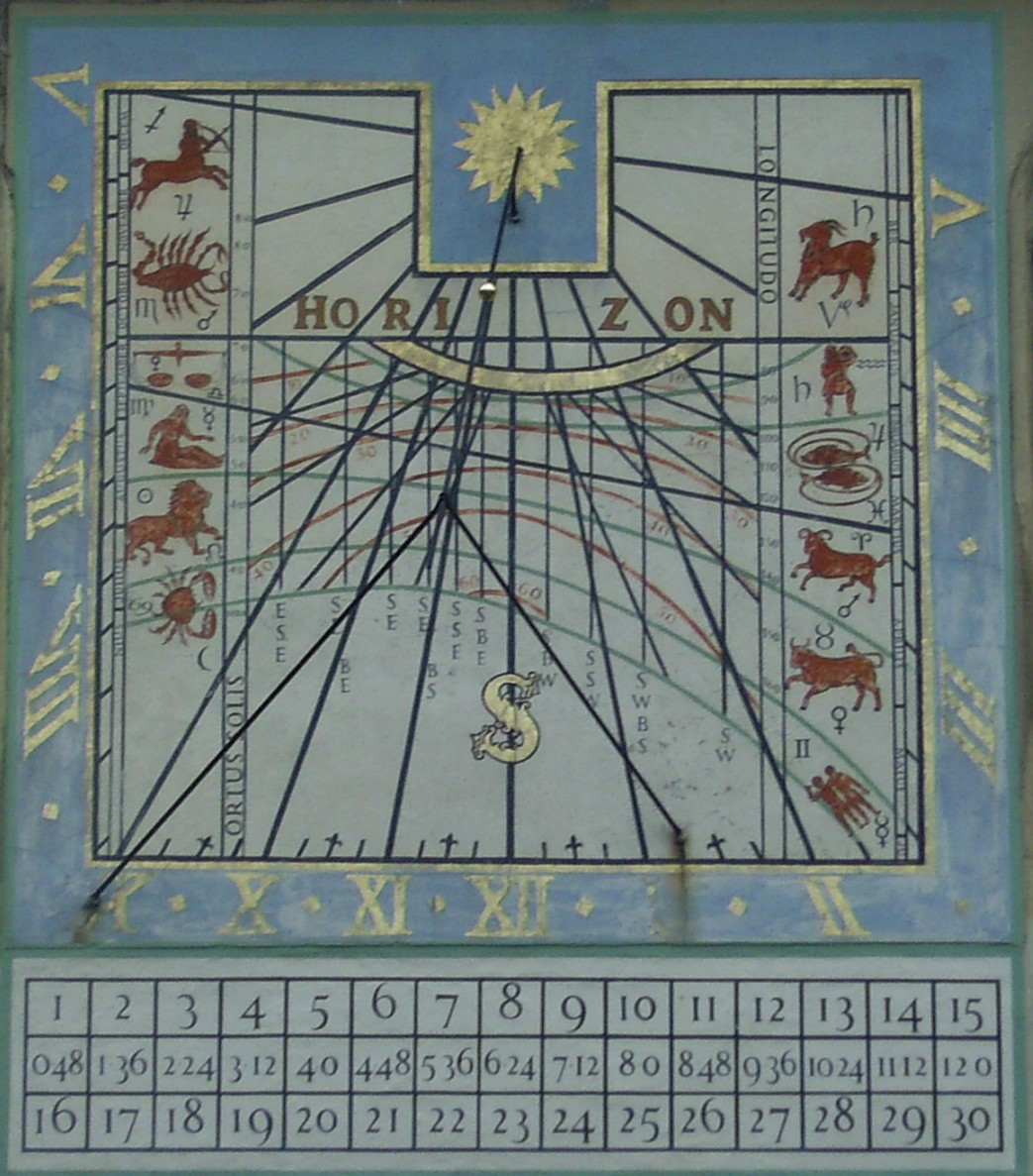
Moondial at Queens' College, Cambridge, showing the table of corrections for the phase of the moon

Moondials are time pieces similar to sundials, using the moon to cast shadows on a marked dial. The most basic moondial is accurate only on the night of the full moon. Every night after that, it loses on average (Note: The Moon's orbit is not circular, so it does not move around the Earth at a uniform rate. Thus while the average difference between moonrises is 48 minutes, the actual time can vary considerably (roughly 20min to 1hr50min depending on the time of year and the location of the Moon in its orbit). The time read by a moondial will also vary in a similar, though not so drastic manner.) 48 minutes, while every night preceding the full moon it gains 48 minutes. Thus, one week to either side of the full moon, the moondial will read 5 hours and 36 minutes before or after the correct time.

More advanced moondials include charts showing the exact calculations to find the correct time, as well as dials designed with latitude and longitude.

Moondials are very closely associated with lunar gardening (night-blooming plants), and some comprehensive gardening books mention them.

== See also ==
- Time
