= Matthew Stewart, 4th Earl of Lennox =

Scottish nobleman and politician (1516–1571)

Matthew Stewart
- 4th Earl of Lennox
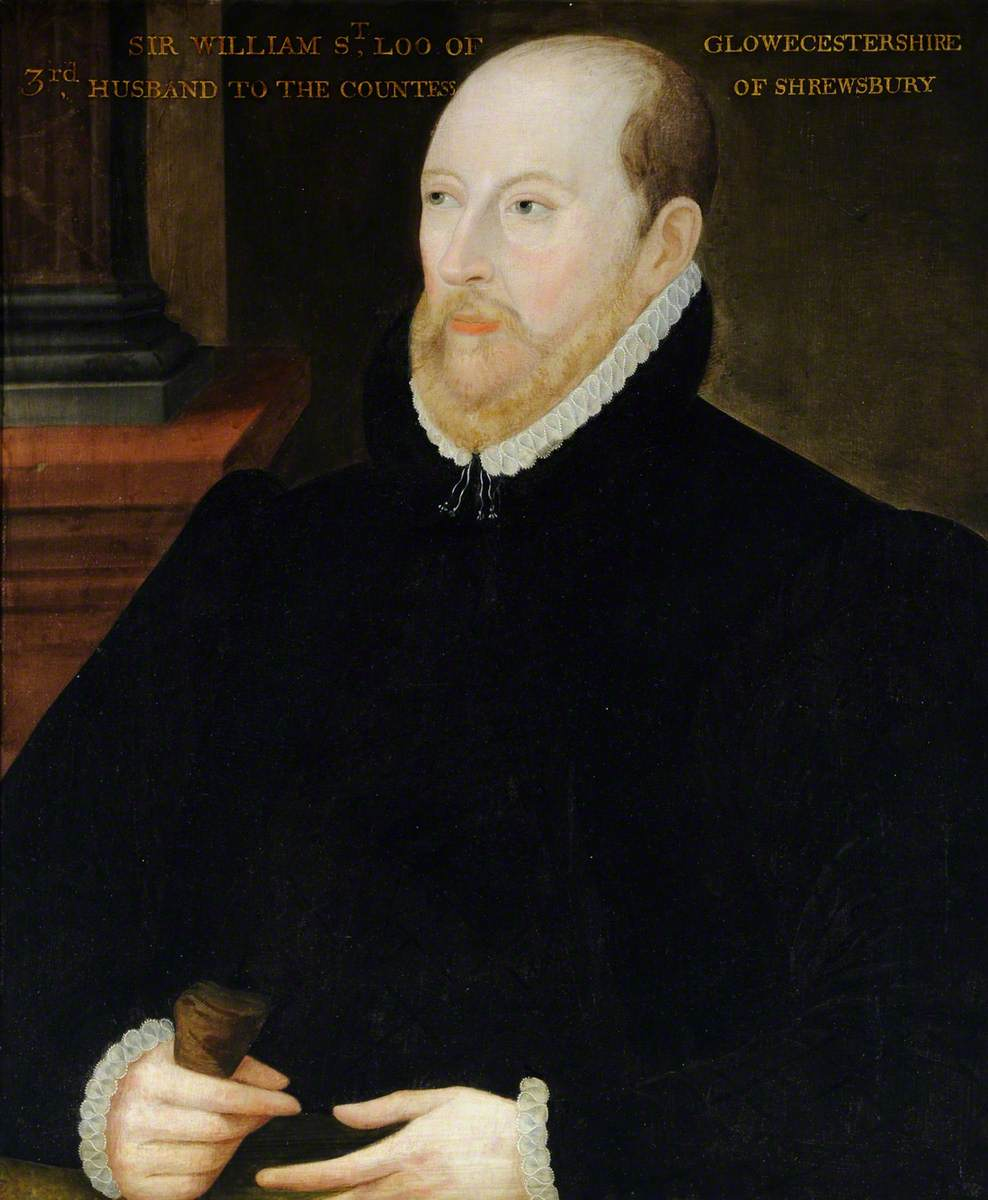
- Born: 21 December 1516; Dumbarton Castle, Scotland
- Died: 4 September 1571 (aged 54); Stirling Castle, Scotland
- Noble family: Stewart of Darnley
- Spouse: Lady Margaret Douglas
- Issue more...: Henry Stuart, Lord Darnley; Charles Stuart, 5th Earl of Lennox
- Father: John Stewart, 3rd Earl of Lennox
- Mother: Elizabeth Stewart

Matthew Stewart, 4th Earl of Lennox (21 September 1516 – 4 September 1571) was a leader of the Catholic nobility in Scotland. He was the paternal grandfather of King James VI and I of Scotland and England. He owned Temple Newsam in Yorkshire, England.

== Origins ==
He was the son of John Stewart, 3rd Earl of Lennox (d.1526), by his wife Lady Elizabeth Stewart, a daughter of John Stewart, 1st Earl of Atholl.

== Conflict with Regent Arran (1543–1547) ==
Matthew Stewart succeeded as Earl of Lennox on the death of his father in 1526. His mother sent him and his younger brother John Stewart to France into the care of their great uncle Robert Stewart, 5th Lord of Aubigny, who enrolled them in the Garde Écossaise. His sisters, Helen and Elizabeth Stewart, were members of the household of Mary of Guise at Linlithgow Palace in March 1539 and were bought French-style clothing.

When King James V of Scotland died in 1542, Cardinal Beaton urged Lennox to return to Scotland to rival James Hamilton, 2nd Earl of Arran. Lennox arrived in March with two ships at his stronghold of Dumbarton Castle just days after Parliament had declared Arran as Regent and heir to the throne after the infant Mary, Queen of Scots. Both Arran and Lennox had claims to the throne as descendants of Mary Stewart, a daughter of King James II of Scotland, but Arran had the better claim as a grandson through a male line, while Lennox was a great-grandson through a female line. Lennox however claimed that Arran was illegitimate because his father had failed to divorce his first wife before marrying Arran's mother.

=== Coronation at Stirling ===
Arran made the Treaty of Greenwich with England on 1 July 1543, which sought to betroth Mary to Prince Edward Tudor, the son and heir of King Henry VIII. Regent Arran began to fortify Linlithgow Palace, where Mary was held with her mother, Mary of Guise, the dowager Queen of Scotland. Lennox allied himself with the pro-French Cardinal David Beaton, and their forces camped outside the palace, but lacked artillery for an assault. The Cardinal's party signed a "Secret Bond" to resist the English marriage plan. Their representatives parleyed with Arran's men at Kirkliston, near Edinburgh, and agreed that Arran would rule with the advice of a council, and Mary would be moved to Stirling Castle. Lennox escorted Mary to Stirling on 26 July 1543.

Mary was crowned at Stirling on 9 September 1543. Lennox held the sceptre. Although Lennox had come to Scotland lured by the prospect of marriage to the widow Mary of Guise, by September he had been offered the chance to marry Lady Margaret Douglas, daughter of the Dowager Queen Margaret Tudor (wife of King James IV of Scotland and sister of King Henry VIII), and half-sister of the deceased King James V. After Lennox had seized the French money and artillery that was sent to Mary of Guise, she offered the hand of her daughter Queen Mary in marriage.

=== The Rough Wooing ===
When the Parliament of Scotland rejected the Greenwich treaty, Lennox changed sides and supported King Henry VIII's military efforts to secure a marriage between Queen Mary and his son Prince Edward, in the war now known as the Rough Wooing. In the summer of 1544, Lennox plundered the Isle of Arran and made himself master of the Isle of Bute and Rothesay Castle, with the support of eighteen ships and 800 men supplied by King Henry VIII. At the Battle of Glasgow Muir, his army managed to drive the first rank of Arran's more numerous forces back into the second rank and captured their cannon. However, the battle ended more favourably for the Regent Arran. There were about 300 slain on both sides, and Lennox himself withdrew to Dumbarton Castle.

After a consultation with his English officers, Lennox attacked Dunoon Castle and burnt the nearby village and church. He subsequently laid waste to a large part of Kintyre, but as he had not succeeded in regaining possession of Dumbarton Castle, he retreated to his ships and sailed for England on about 28 May 1544. He stayed for a time at Wressle Castle. He was granted a letter of denization by Henry VIII in July 1544. Donald Dubh formed an alliance of Highland Isles landowners in support of Lennox, on 5 August 1545 swearing an oath of allegiance to Henry VIII and acknowledging the Lennox as the true regent of Scotland (rather than Regent Arran or Mary of Guise). Despite English support, Dubh's Rebellion was ineffective, due to disorganization and poor logistics.

Lennox joined the English invasion force in September 1547. When the main English army approached Edinburgh before the Battle of Pinkie, far to the west, a diversionary invasion of 5,000 men was led jointly by Thomas Wharton and Lennox. They took Castlemilk and burnt Annan, after a bitter struggle to capture its fortified church.

== Later life ==
For a time Lennox and his family resided at Whorlton Castle in North Yorkshire, which had been granted, with the estate, to him by King Henry VIII. Later, at some point in the late 16th century, a house was built there by the Lennox family adjoining the northwest end of the castle's gatehouse.

In August 1548 Lennox gave four promises to Mary of Guise in order for her assent to her daughter Queen Mary's marriage to King Francis II of France. These were as follows: that he and his friends and retainers would preserve the Catholic faith in Scotland; that they would guard the Auld Alliance; that Guise would remain guardian of the Queen and that he would punish all who supported the King of England.

Lennox returned to Scotland upon the urging of Queen Elizabeth I of England, during the marriage negotiations of Queen Mary of Scots in October 1564. He was given lodgings in Holyrood Palace, and the queen's tapestry worker Pierre Martin refurbished a crimson velvet bed for him. Lennox gave Mary a "marvellous fair and rich" jewell, a clock, and a looking glass set with precious stones, and diamond rings to several courtiers and presents to the queen's four Maries. Lennox quickly took up his position as the most powerful lord in the Glasgow area and was later instrumental in the marriage of his elder son, Lord Darnley, to Queen Mary. Whether Queen Elizabeth I had intended this (in order to eliminate the threat of a continental marriage), as is sometimes conjectured, remains doubtful. The Queen of England reacted with disapproval and had Lennox's wife Margaret confined in the Tower of London. By August 1565 William Cecil had heard that the insolence of his son Lord Darnley had driven Lennox from the Scottish court.

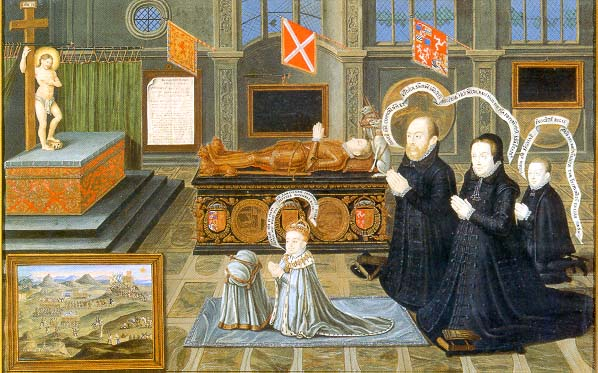
Matthew Stewart, 4th Earl of Lennox, his wife Lady Margaret Douglas, his youngest son Charles, the future 5th Earl of Lennox and his grandson, King James VI praying and crying before an image of Christ on the Cross for the murder of his son Henry, Lord Darnley

After his elder son Lord Darnley was murdered early in 1567 Lennox was the most ardent pursuant of justice against the lords who had conspired in the murder. He also became the main witness against Queen Mary though her possible involvement in the murder thought to have been carried out by her later husband, Lord Bothwell, is controversial.

== Death ==
In 1570 Lennox became regent for his grandson King James VI of Scotland, but Queen Mary's party declared war against him. He was shot dead next year in a skirmish when the Queen's party attacked Stirling. The raid on Stirling on 4 September 1571 was led by the George Gordon, 5th Earl of Huntly, Claude Hamilton, and the lairds of Buccleuch and Ferniehurst. Early reports said he was killed by his own party. William Kirkcaldy of Grange said the shot was fired by the Queen's party, and another account names David Bochinant as the assassin.

Lennox is thought to have been buried within the Chapel Royal at Stirling Castle, which was unusual. The site of the burial has not been conclusively determined. A burial discovered by archaeologists in an old chapel site at the Castle, the Governor's Kitchen, dated by radiocarbon methods to the correct period, could have been Lennox's.

== Marriage and issue ==
In 1544 he married Lady Margaret Douglas, daughter of Archibald Douglas, 6th Earl of Angus, by his wife the Dowager Queen Margaret Tudor, who had a claim to the English throne. By Margaret he had issue:

- Henry Stuart (1544–1544) who died shortly after birth;
- Henry Stuart, Lord Darnley (1546–1567), born at Temple Newsam, who married Mary, Queen of Scots, daughter of King James V; his son was King James VI and I of Scotland and England;
- Philip Stuart (1556);
- Charles Stuart, 5th Earl of Lennox (1557–1576), who in 1574 married Elizabeth Cavendish, a daughter of Sir William Cavendish by his wife Elizabeth Hardwick. His daughter was Lady Arbella Stuart.

== Ancestry ==
Ancestors of Matthew Stewart, 4th Earl of Lennox

John Stewart, 1st Earl of Lennox
Matthew Stewart, 2nd Earl of Lennox
Margaret Montgomerie
John Stewart, 3rd Earl of Lennox
James Hamilton, 1st Lord Hamilton
Elizabeth Hamilton
Mary of Scotland
Matthew Stewart, 4th Earl of Lennox
James Stewart, the Black Knight of Lorn
John Stewart, 1st Earl of Atholl
Joan Beaufort
Elizabeth Stewart
William Sinclair, 1st Earl of Caithness
Eleanor Sinclair
Marjory Sutherland

Government offices
Preceded by The Earl of Moray	Regent of Scotland; 1570–1571	Succeeded by The Earl of Mar
Peerage of Scotland
Preceded by John Stewart	Earl of Lennox; 1526–1571	Succeeded by James VI (Merged with the Crown)
