= Countess of Lennox =

Countess of Lennox may refer to:

- Margaret, Countess of Lennox (d. circa 1364)
- Isabella, Countess of Lennox (d. 1458)
- Margaret Douglas (1515–1578)
- Elizabeth Stuart, Countess of Lennox (1555–1582)
