= Holy Cross Church, Swainby =

Church in North Yorkshire, England

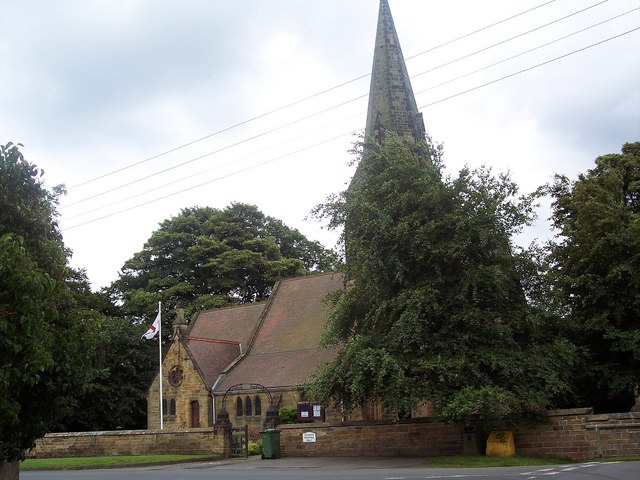
The church, in 2007

Holy Cross Church is the parish church of Swainby, a village in North Yorkshire, in England.

The church was built in 1877, as a replacement for Whorlton Old Church. It was designed by T. H. Wyatt, and was constructed using stone from Whorlton Castle. The building was grade II listed in 1966.

The church is built of sandstone with tile roofs, and consists of a nave, a north aisle, a chancel with a north vestry, and a northwest steeple. The steeple has a tower with three stages, stepped angle buttresses, a west stair turret, a north door with lancet windows above, a clock face, paired louvred bell openings under an arch, an eaves corbel table, and a broach spire with lucarnes and a weathervane. Inside, there is a stone and marble pulpit and assorted stained glass, including the east window and one south window by Charles Eamer Kempe.

== See also ==
- Listed buildings in Whorlton, North Yorkshire
