= Elizabeth Cooper (disambiguation) =

Elizabeth Cooper (1914–1960) was an actress and mistress of General Douglas MacArthur.

Elizabeth Cooper may also refer to:

- Elizabeth Cooper (dramatist) (c. 1698–c. 1761), British actress, playwright and editor
- Elizabeth Priscilla Cooper (1816–1889), daughter in law of John Tyler, president of the United States
- Elizabeth Cooper (historian) (fl. 1865–1874), English historian and biographer
- Elizabeth Cooper (traveler) (1877–1945), American traveler, writer and researcher.
- Betty Cooper, fictional character of Archie Comics

== See also ==
- Isabel Cooper (1892–1984), American artist
