= Whorlton Old Church =

Church in North Yorkshire, England

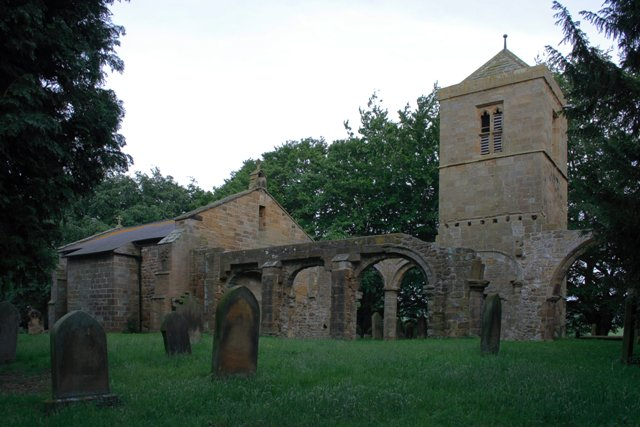
The building, in 2007

Whorlton Old Church, also known as Holy Cross Church, is a partly-ruined church in Whorlton, North Yorkshire, a village in England.

The church was built in the mid 12th century, from which period parts of the north arcade, chancel arch and chancel survive. The south side of the nave was rebuilt around 1200, and the north arcade extended a bay to the west later in the century. The chancel was rebuilt and lengthened around 1300, while the tower was added around 1400. In 1877, Holy Cross Church, Swainby was built to replace the old church. The north chapel was demolished, and the nave was allowed to fall into ruin. The ruins were stabilised in 1891, and the tower was re-roofed. The building was grade I listed in 1966. Services continue to be held in the church, twice a year.

The church is built of sandstone, the chancel has a roof of Welsh slate, the nave is without a roof, and the west tower roof is in stone slate. The tower has a doorway with a pointed arch, bell openings with ogee heads, a blocking course and a pyramidal roof with a ball on spike finial. Inside, there is a piscina and a tub font. There is also an effigy of Nicholas de Meynell, who died in 1322, which has been carved from bog oak.

== See also ==
- Grade I listed buildings in North Yorkshire (district)
- Listed buildings in Whorlton, North Yorkshire
