= Whorlton Hoard =

The Whorlton Hoard is a Romano-British hoard of coinage and metalwork found at Whorlton, North Yorkshire, discovered in 1810, and dating to the late fourth or early fifth centuries AD.

== Discovery ==
The hoard was discovered by a farmworker sloughing at Whorle Hill, near Whorlton, North Yorkshire in spring 1810. They identified a leather bag containing a metal vessel which contained the coins and metalwork. It was reported to weigh a total of 2 stone (13 kg). The landowner, the Earl of Aylesbury took possession of the find shortly afterwards.

Parts of the hoard were purchased by the British Museum in 1857 from an Alfred Jackson. Other parts are in the collection of the Rotunda Museum.

== Contents ==
The exact original number of items in the hoard is now lost. 38 coins dating to the period AD 355-402 are preserved in the British museum, all are siliquae or miliarenses representing the Emperors: Constantius II, Julian, Valens, Gratian, Theodosius I, Magnus Maximus, Eugenius, Arcadius, Honorius, Valentinian I, Valentinian II. Nine objects are also retained in the British Museum collection: an engraved silver finger-ring, a plain silver ring, a silver ring with a blue glass setting, a fragment of a silver spoon, a silver buckle fragment, a fragment of silver sheet, and two copper-alloy rings. The latest coins in the hoard provide a date of AD 395-402 for the hoard.

Portable XRF analysis of the hoard by a research team at the University of Kent identified that the metalwork in the hoard was all high-quality, with coins and objects having a silver content of greater than 90%. This result is in keeping with other comparable hoards like the Hoxne hoard.

== Public display ==
The hoard was on public display at the Dorman Museum in March to September 1980 in an exhibition titled "Early Man in North-East Yorkshire". From February to May 2026 it was in the "Britain's Last Roman Hoards" exhibition at the British Museum.
