= Listed buildings in Whorlton, North Yorkshire =

Whorlton is a civil parish in the county of North Yorkshire, England. It contains 15 listed buildings that are recorded in the National Heritage List for England. Of these, two are listed at Grade I, the highest of the three grades, one is at Grade II*, the middle grade, and the others are at Grade II, the lowest grade. The parish contains the village of Swainby, the settlement of Whorlton, and the surrounding countryside. The most important listed buildings in the parish are the remains of Whorlton Castle and the Old Church of the Holy Rood, and the others include houses, farmhouses, farm buildings, a limekiln, a pinfold, a bridge, a former school and master's house, and a church.

== Key ==
Grade	Criteria
I	Buildings of exceptional interest, sometimes considered to be internationally important
II*	Particularly important buildings of more than special interest
II	Buildings of national importance and special interest

== Buildings ==
Name and location	Photograph	Date	Notes	Grade
Old Church of the Holy Rood; 54.41521°N 1.25678°W		12th century	The church has been altered and extended through the centuries, and is now partly in ruins. It is built in sandstone, the chancel has a roof of Welsh slate, the nave is without a roof, and the west tower roof is in stone slate. The tower has a doorway with a pointed arch, bell openings with ogee heads, a blocking course and a pyramidal roof with a ball on spike finial.	I
Undercrofts, Whorlton Castle; 54.41549°N 1.26066°W		14th century (probable)	The remains of the two undercrofts are in sandstone. They are both barrel vaults, one round, the other slightly pointed. The southern undercroft has a west window with a transom and a doorway. To the north is a projection with a pointed arch, and on the west side is a staircase with an arched doorway.	II*
Gatehouse, Whorlton Castle; 54.41536°N 1.26010°W		Late 14th century	The gatehouse is the most substantial remaining part of the castle. It is in sandstone on a high chamfered plinth, and is roofless and floorless. There is a rectangular plan, three storeys and three bays. The entrance has a double-chamfered segmental arch and above it are three shields and a floor band. Most of the windows are cross windows with chamfered surrounds, and there are small single lights and slits. On the northwest is a projecting staircase tower with a round-arched doorway.	I
Sparrow Hall; 54.39710°N 1.22451°W		Early 18th century	The house is in sandstone, with an eaves band, and a pantile roof with a stone ridge, copings and kneelers. There are two storeys and three bays, and a single-storey single-bay wing on the right. The central doorway has a chamfered surround, and the windows are casements, the ground floor openings under heavy lintels.	II
Limekiln; 54.39992°N 1.27264°W		18th century (probable)	The lime kiln, which is partly in ruins, is built into a hillside. It is in sandstone and consists of a single round chamber with a small drawhole.	II
Pinfold; 54.41344°N 1.26760°W		18th century (or earlier)	The pinfold is in large sandstone blocks with half-round coping. It consists of a square enclosure with walls stepped down from the north to the south, and contains a 20th-century wrought iron gate. On the north wall is an inscribed plaque.	II
Rivington; 54.41095°N 1.26589°W	—	Mid-18th century	The house is in red brick on a stone plinth, with stepped and cogged eaves, and a pantile roof with a tile ridge and stone gable copings. There are two storeys and two bays. On the front is a porch, to the left is a canted bay window, and to the right is a casement window and a small fire window. The upper floor contains sash windows.	II
Trenholme Farmhouse; 54.41480°N 1.31224°W		Mid-18th century	The farmhouse is in red brick, with some stone at the rear, a floor band, stepped and cogged eaves, and a pantile roof with stone coping and kneelers. There are two storeys and three bays, flanking single-storey extensions with corrugated asbestos roofs, and a rear gabled wing with extensions. In the centre is a brick porch, the windows on the main part are sashes with flat gauged brick arches, and the right extension has a casement window.	II
Church Farmhouse; 54.41160°N 1.26461°W	—	Mid to late 18th century	A farmhouse and a cottage, later combined, in sandstone, with quoins, and a pantile roof with a stone ridge, copings and kneelers. There are two storeys, the main house has three bays, and to the right the former cottage is lower with three wider bays. The house has a central doorway with a fanlight, above it is a panel painted as a window, and the other windows are sashes. All the openings have lintels with tall projecting keystones. The cottage has a doorway and a mix of casement windows and horizontally sliding sash windows.	II
118 High Street, Swainby; 54.41030°N 1.26494°W	—	Late 18th century	The house is in sandstone on a plinth, with a moulded eaves cornice, and a pantile roof with a stone ridge, copings and kneelers. There are two storeys and two bays. On the front is a doorway, to its right is a small fixed window, and the other windows are casements. The windows and doorways have splayed lintels and tall projecting keystones.	II
Barn and byre east of Scarth Wood Farmhouse; 54.40058°N 1.28406°W	—	Late 18th century (probable)	The farm buildings are in sandstone on a plinth, with quoins, and a pantile roof with a stone ridge, copings and kneelers. They form an L-shaped plan, the barn with two storeys, a stable door, a loading door and slit vents. The byre has one storey and contains a stable door, and at the end is an open cart shed.	II
Middle Bridge; 54.41138°N 1.26587°W		Early 19th century (probable)	The bridge carries a road over Swainby Beck. It is in sandstone with chamfered coping, and consists of a single segmental arch. The bridge has cut voussoirs, a band, a parapet and square end piers.	II
Scarth Wood Farmhouse and stable 54.40056°N 1.28435°W		Early to mid-19th century	The farmhouse is in sandstone on a plinth, with quoins, a parapet band, an embattled parapet, and a Welsh slate roof with a stone ridge, kneelers, and gable copings with ball finials. There are two storeys and two bays. In the centre is an open porch containing a chamfered flattened Tudor arch with a hood mould, and an embattled parapet. Within the porch are side benches. On the ground floor are mullioned windows stepped under hood moulds, and the upper floor has casement windows. At the rear is a single-storey stable range with a pantile roof and stable doors.	II
Former Whorlton Memorial School and Schoolmaster's House; 54.41186°N 1.26480°W	—	1856	The former school and master's house are in red brick on a stone plinth, with stone dressings, quoins, and a Welsh slate roof. The school has a T-shaped plan, with the main range parallel to the road, and a gabled wing projecting forward towards the road. The windows are mullioned or mullioned and transomed, and above the window facing the street is an inscribed and dated panel. To the left is a bell tower with a gabled bellcote in stone with a single arch. The master's house to the right has the gable end facing the road, and a doorway with a Tudor arch. On the right return are four bays and a bay window.	II
Church of the Holy Cross; 54.41132°N 1.26523°W		1877	The church, designed by T. H. Wyatt, is built in sandstone with tile roofs, and consists of a nave, a north aisle, a chancel with a north vestry, and a northwest steeple. The steeple has a tower with three stages, stepped angle buttresses, a west stair turret, a north door with lancet windows above, a clock face, paired louvred bell openings under an arch, an eaves corbel table, and a broach spire with lucarnes and a weathervane.	II
