= William Cavendish (courtier) =

English politician

Sir William Cavendish MP
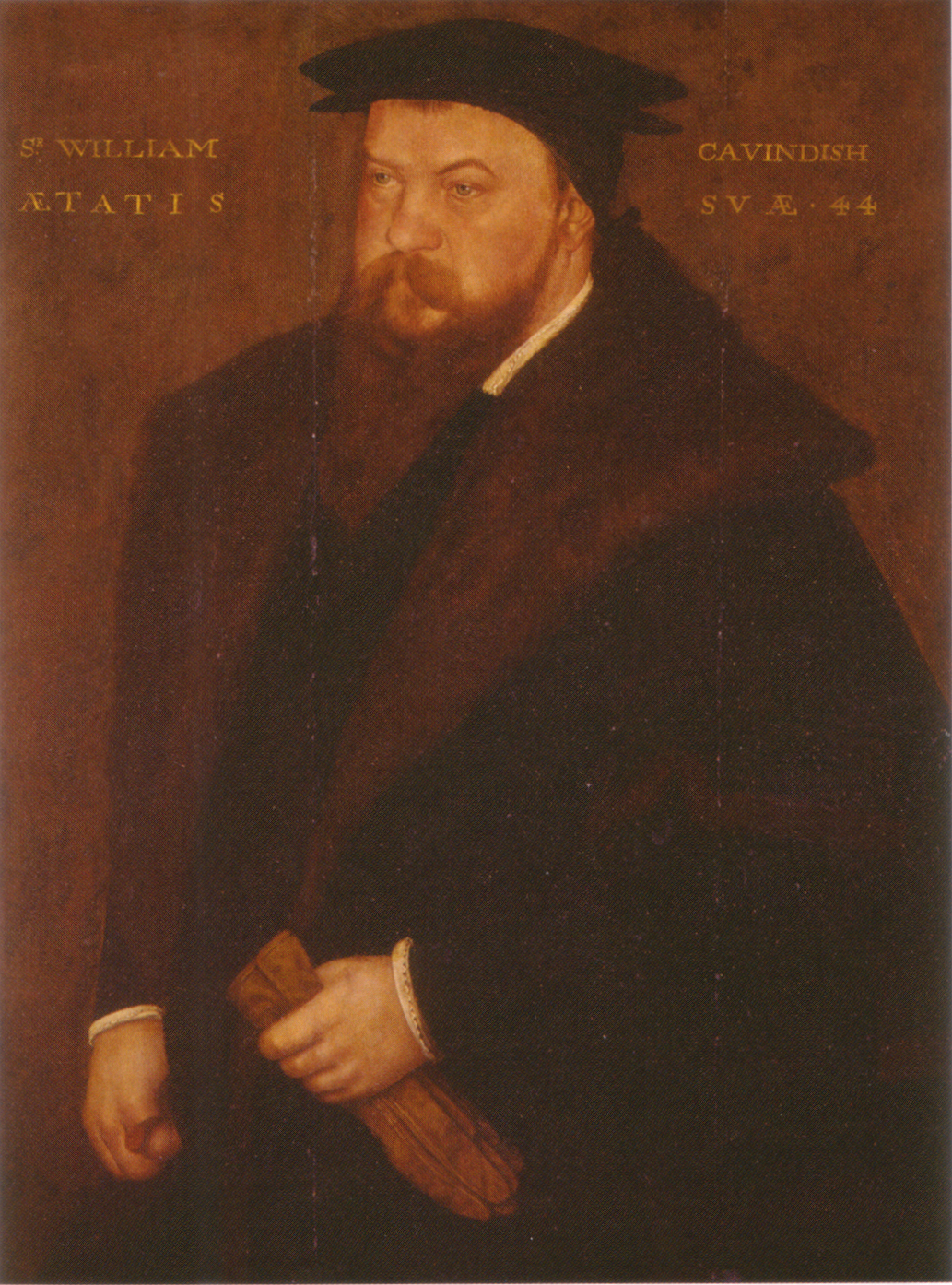
- Sir William Cavendish c. 1547
- Born: c. 1505
- Died: 25 October 1557
- Occupations: Politician, knight, courtier
- Title: Sir
- Spouses: Margaret Bostock (1st), Elizabeth Parker (2nd), Bess of Hardwick (3rd)
- Children: 16 (including William Cavendish, 1st Earl of Devonshire, Elizabeth Stuart, Countess of Lennox, and Mary Talbot, Countess of Shrewsbury)
- Parent(s): Thomas Cavendish; Alice Smith
- Relatives: Sir John Cavendish (great-grandfather)

Sir William Cavendish MP (c. 1505 – 25 October 1557) was an English politician, knight and courtier. Cavendish held public office and accumulated a considerable fortune, and became one of Thomas Cromwell's "visitors of the monasteries" during the dissolution of the monasteries. He was MP for Thirsk in 1547. In 1547 he married Bess of Hardwick, and the couple began the construction of Chatsworth House in 1552, a project which would not be completed until after his death. His second son William Cavendish (1552–1626) became the first Earl of Devonshire, purchasing his title from the impecunious King James I.

== Early life ==
He was the younger son of Thomas Cavendish (1472–1524), who was a senior financial official, the Clerk of the Pipe, in the Court of Exchequer, and his wife, Alice Smith of Padbrook Hall. He was the great-great-great-grandson of Sir John Cavendish from whom the Dukes of Devonshire and the Dukes of Newcastle inherited the family name of Cavendish.

== Career ==
Cavendish became one of Thomas Cromwell's "visitors of the monasteries" when King Henry VIII annexed the property of the Catholic Church at the end of the 1530s, in the dissolution of the monasteries. This followed from his successful career as a financial expert holding public office in the Exchequer, which led to his wealth. He was accused of accumulating extra riches unfairly during the dissolution. After Cromwell's fall, he was sent to Ireland to survey and value lands which had fallen to the English during the FitzGerald Rebellion.

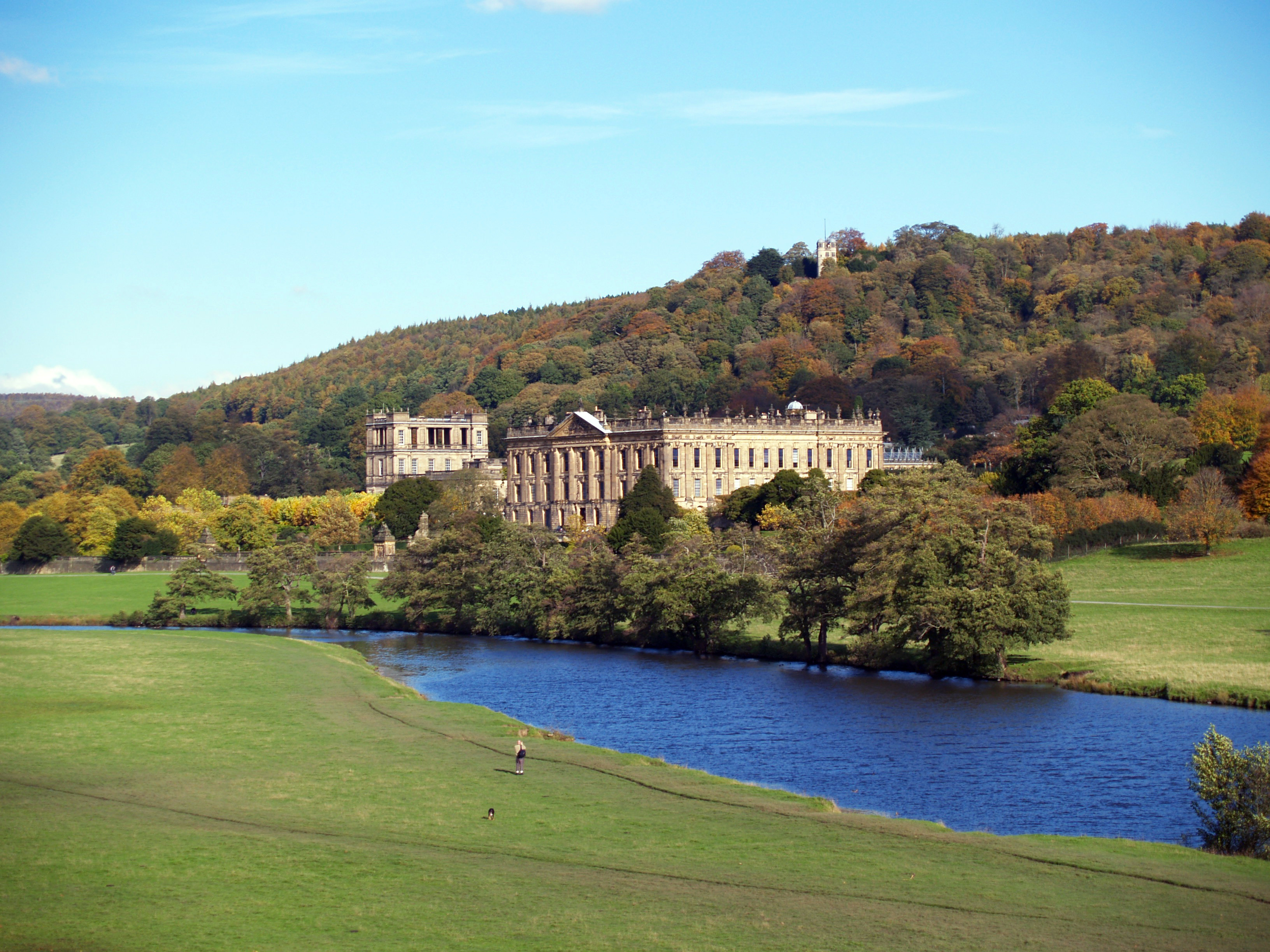
Chatsworth House, Derbyshire, begun by Cavendish

He was connected to the Seymour brothers Edward and Thomas, and via them to the family of Jane Grey, but he also took care to send tokens of goodwill to the Lady Mary. He was appointed Treasurer of the Chamber from 1546 to 1553 but, after an audit, was accused of embezzling a significant amount of money. Only his death saved the family from disgrace.

During the reign of Mary I, a favourable biography of Thomas Wolsey was first published, written from the perspective of one of his closest aides, the one who had taken King Henry news of Wolsey's death. Although for centuries Sir William was said to be its author, historians now attribute it to his older brother George Cavendish (1494–1562).

== Family ==
William Cavendish had a total of 16 children by three different wives. His first wife was Margaret Bostock; they had five children, but only three daughters survived:

- Catherine, who married Thomas Brooke, son of Lord Cobham
- Mary (died after 1547)
- Ann, who married Sir Henry Boynton in 1561, the son of Edward Bayntun and Isabel Leigh, Lady Bayntun, the half-sister of Queen Katherine Howard
- Margaret, died in 1540

In 1542, he was married to Elizabeth Parker; she had three children, none of whom survived. She died after giving birth to a stillborn daughter in 1546.

In 1547, he married Bess of Hardwick. He sold his property in Suffolk and moved to Bess's native county of Derbyshire. He purchased the Chatsworth estate in 1549 and the couple began to build Chatsworth House in 1552.

In the ten years before he died, they had eight children, six of whom survived infancy:

- Frances Cavendish (1548–1632), married Henry Pierrepont
- Henry Cavendish (1550–1616), eldest son, Knight of the Shire and MP for Derbyshire for over 20 years, eventually disinherited by his mother in favour of his younger brother William (ancestor of the branch of the family holding the title of Baron Waterpark)
- William Cavendish (1552–1626), the first Earl of Devonshire
- Charles Cavendish (1553–1617), father of William Cavendish, 1st Duke of Newcastle
- Elizabeth Cavendish (1555–1582), later entered into a controversial marriage with Charles Stuart, 1st Earl of Lennox, by whom she was the mother of Arbella Stuart, claimant to the English throne
- Mary Cavendish (1556–1632), married Gilbert Talbot, 7th Earl of Shrewsbury. Their daughter Alethea Talbot Howard is an ancestor of the 5th and later Dukes of Norfolk.
