= Lady Arbella Stuart =

English noblewoman (1575–1615)

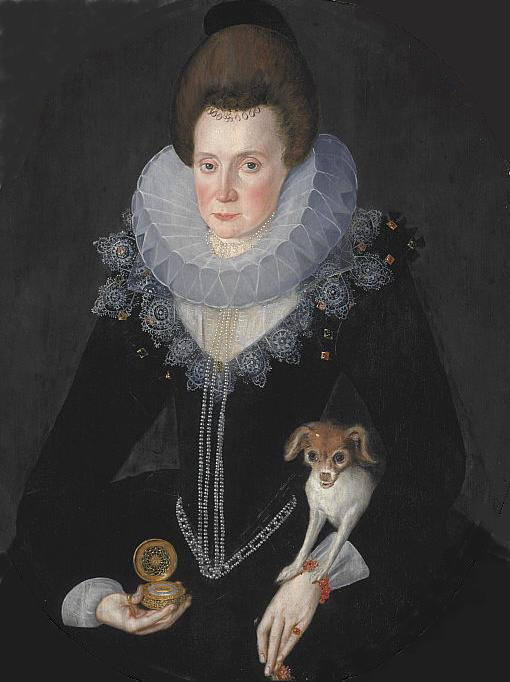
- Born: 10 November 1575; Nottinghamshire or Hackney, Middlesex, England
- Died: 25 September 1615 (aged 39); Tower of London, Middlesex, England
- Noble family: House of Stuart
- Spouse: William Seymour, 2nd Duke of Somerset
- Father: Charles Stuart, 5th Earl of Lennox
- Mother: Elizabeth Cavendish

Lady Arbella Stuart (also Arabella, or Stewart; 10 November 1575 – 25 September 1615) was an English noblewoman who was considered a possible successor to Elizabeth I. During the reign of James VI and I (her first cousin), she married William Seymour, 2nd Duke of Somerset, another claimant to the English throne, in secret. King James imprisoned Seymour and placed her under house arrest. When she and her husband tried to escape England, she was captured and imprisoned in the Tower of London, where she died at age 39.

== Descent ==
She was the only child of Charles Stuart, 1st Earl of Lennox (of the third creation), by his marriage to Elizabeth Cavendish. She was a grandchild of Matthew Stewart, 4th Earl of Lennox (of the second creation) and Lady Margaret Douglas, the daughter and heiress of Archibald Douglas, 6th Earl of Angus, and of Margaret Tudor, daughter of King Henry VII of England and widow of King James IV of Scotland. Arbella was therefore a great-great-granddaughter of Henry VII and was in line of succession to the English throne, although she did not herself aspire to it.

Her paternal grandparents, the 4th Earl of Lennox and Margaret Douglas, had, of their eight children, two sons who survived childhood: Arbella's father Charles and his older brother Henry Stuart, Lord Darnley, who became the second husband of Mary, Queen of Scots, and the father of Arbella's cousin James VI and I of Scotland, England and Ireland. Her maternal grandparents were Sir William Cavendish and his wife Elizabeth, better known as "Bess of Hardwick".

== Childhood ==
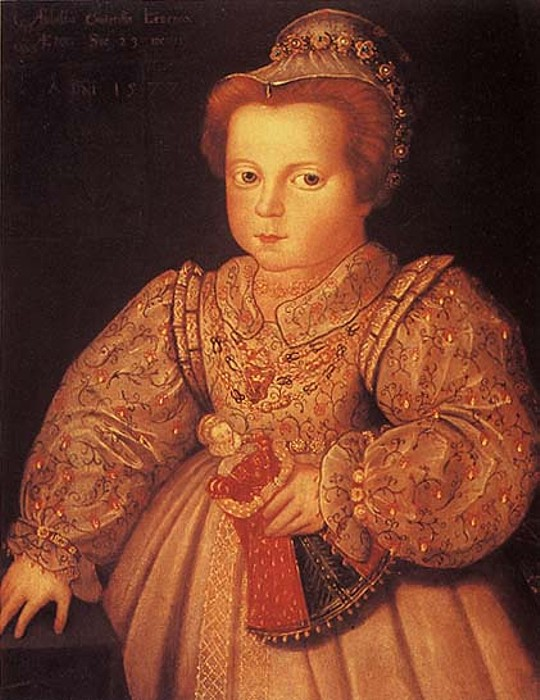
Arbella Stuart aged 2. circa 1577

Arbella's father died in 1576 when she was an infant. She was raised by her mother Elizabeth Cavendish, Countess of Lennox, until 1582. The death of her mother left seven-year-old Arbella an orphan, whereupon she became the ward of her grandmother Bess, rather than Lord Burghley, the Master of the Court of Wards, as might have been expected.

During most of her childhood she lived in the protective isolation of Hardwick Hall in Derbyshire with her grandmother, who had married George Talbot, 6th Earl of Shrewsbury, in 1568. It seems she enjoyed periodic visits to the court and to London, including court visits during the summers of 1587 and 1588 and one that lasted from November 1591 to July 1592.

Starting in early 1589 or thereabouts "one Morley ... attended on Arbell and read to her", as reported in a dispatch from Bess of Hardwick to Lord Burghley, dated 21 September 1592. Bess recounts Morley's service to Arbella over "the space of three years and a half". She also notes he had hoped for an annuity of £40 a year (equivalent to £13,300 in 2025) from Arbella based on the fact that he had "been so much damnified [i.e. that much out of pocket] by leaving the University". This has led to speculation that Morley was the poet Christopher Marlowe, whose name was sometimes spelt that way.

== Heiress to the English throne ==
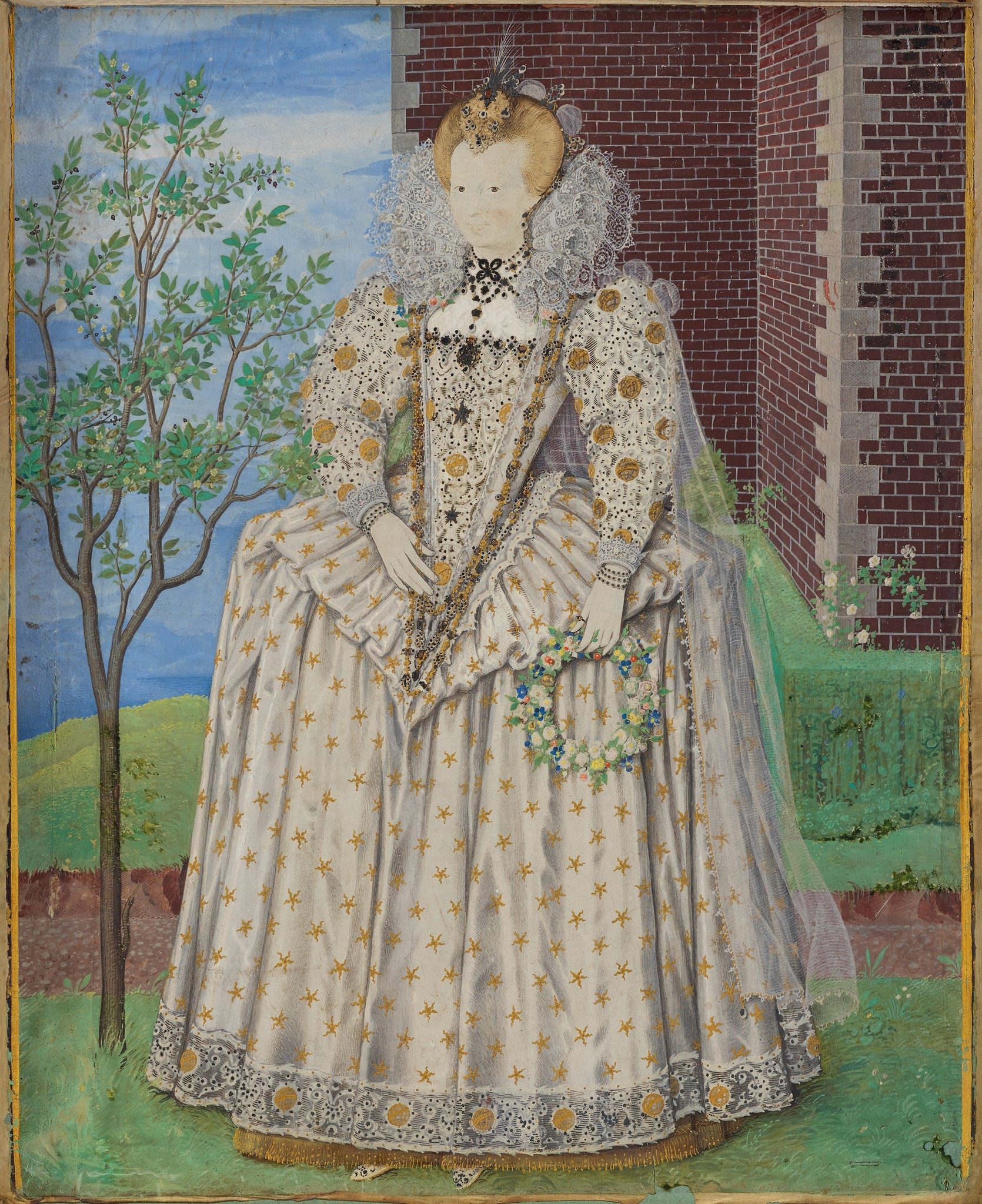
Arbella Stuart in 1592, Nicholas Hilliard.

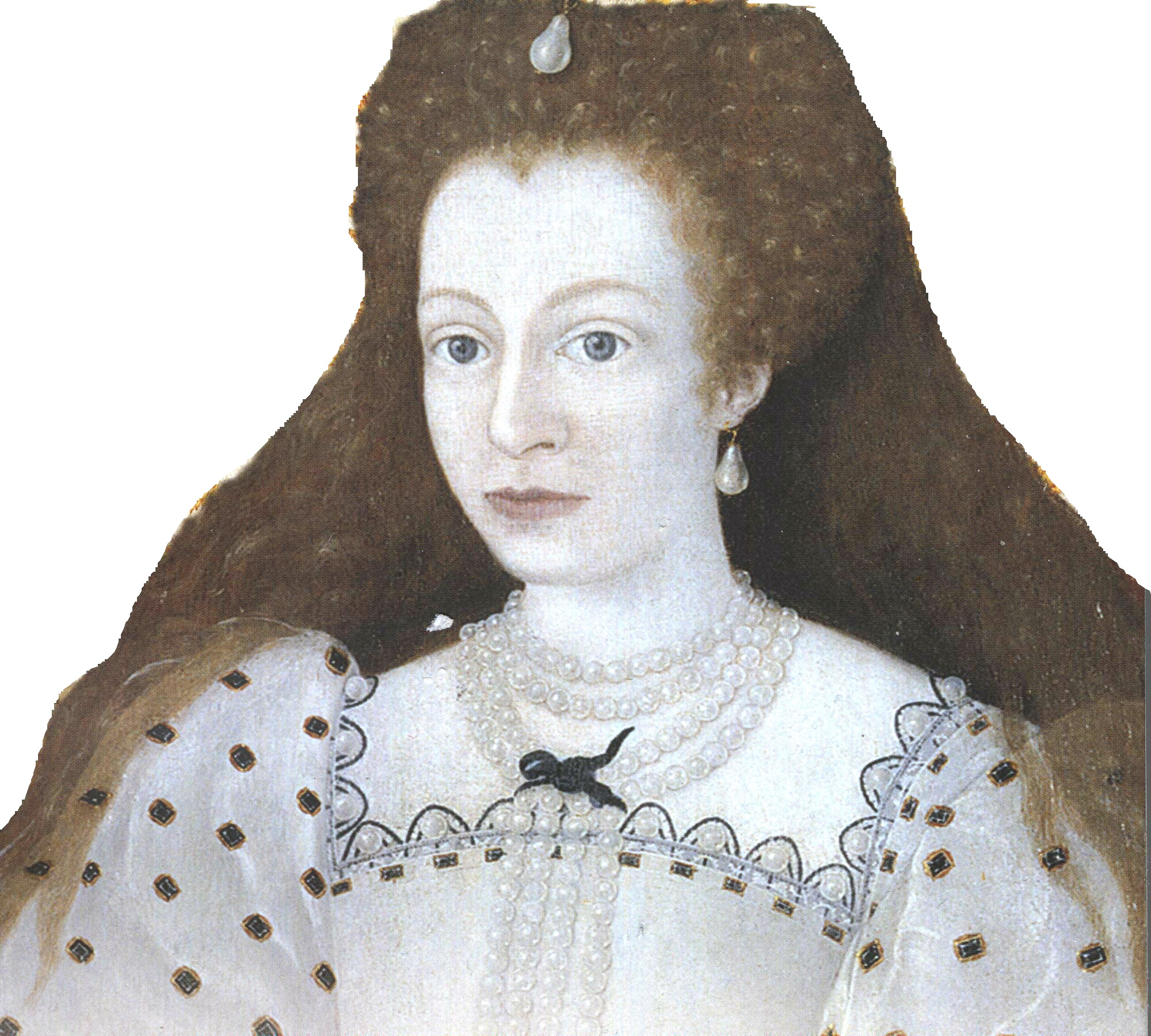
Arbella Stuart

For some time before 1592, Arbella was considered one of the natural candidates to succeed her first cousin twice removed, Queen Elizabeth I.

Arbella’s exact place in the line of succession was a matter of debate both legally and politically. By strict Primogeniture, she was second behind her cousin James before the birth of his children. However, the Treason Act 1351 from the reign of Edward III barred “aliens” from inheriting the English throne which Arbella’s supporters (mainly Catholics who opposed James) argued meant she was first in line as she was born in England and James was not. Further complicating matters was that Henry VIII’s will had bypassed the Stuarts altogether to place his niece Frances Grey (daughter of his younger sister Mary) and her descendants behind his own children. Due to the ambiguity surrounding her, Arbella became a key chess piece to the various groups who wanted to use her for their own ends.

However, between the end of 1592 and the spring of 1593, the influential Cecils – Elizabeth's Lord Treasurer, Lord Burghley, and his son, Secretary of State Sir Robert Cecil – turned their attention away from Arbella towards her cousin James VI of Scotland, regarding him as a preferable successor. James had many perceived strengths over Arbella: he was staunchly Protestant while she was of ambiguous religious affiliation, he had proved himself a successful ruler in Scotland, he was a man and she was a woman after two Queens in a row, and he was married and had children which secured his own succession.

Sometimes she was invited to Elizabeth's court, but much of her time she spent away living with her grandmother. Continuing her education into her twenties, she studied several languages and could play the lute, viol and virginals. Elizabeth told Marie de La Châtre, the wife of the French ambassador Guillaume de l'Aubespine de Châteauneuf, about Arbella's skills in speaking Latin, French and Italian.

In 1603 James became James I of England at the Union of the Crowns. Arbella refused to act as the chief mourner at the funeral of Elizabeth I. She came to court in August 1603. There was plague in London, and the court moved west to Basing House and Winchester in October. Arbella wrote letters to the Earl of Shrewsbury criticising a masque, Prince Henry's Welcome at Winchester produced by Anne of Denmark for her son, Prince Henry, and also the childish singing and games in the queen's household.

In November 1603 those involved in the Main Plot were said to have conspired to overthrow King James and put Arbella on the throne. Arbella had been invited to participate and agree in writing to Philip III of Spain, however, she immediately reported the invitation to the king. In March 1604 the royal family celebrated their Entry to London, which had been delayed because of the plague. There was a procession, and Arbella followed Anne of Denmark in a carriage with some of the queen's maids of honour. This was a public acknowledgement of her royal status.

The Venetian ambassador Nicolò Molin described her in 1607, writing that she was 28 (sic) years old, not very beautiful, but highly accomplished in several languages, with refined manners, and always studying.

== Marriage negotiations ==
Owing to Arbella's status as a possible heir to the throne, there were discussions of appropriate marriages for her throughout her childhood.

In 1588, it was proposed to James VI of Scotland that Ludovic Stuart, 2nd Duke of Lennox, should be married to Arbella, but nothing seems to have come of this suggestion. James VI was interested in this match but the Countess of Lennox's servant Thomas Fowler discouraged him. Other potential matches were the sons of Alexander Farnese, Duke of Parma, who could claim the English throne as descendants of John of Gaunt. The idea was to secure toleration for English Catholics or even win Arbella for the Catholic faith. However, the eldest son, Ranuccio, was already married, and the younger son, Odoardo, was a Cardinal sworn to priestly celibacy. The Pope was reportedly prepared to absolve Odoardo from his obligations but the resistance of Queen Elizabeth I to such a marriage stopped the plan probably even before Arbella could be approached.

In 1599, an English Catholic, Edmund Ashfield, wrote to James VI on the subject of the succession to the throne of England. He considered the possibility that Elizabeth might allow Arbella Stuart to marry an English husband, and thus "assisted by some domestical match", she might become queen and continue the "sweet pleasing government" of England by a female ruler.

In the closing months of Elizabeth's reign, Arbella fell into trouble through reports that she intended to marry Edward Seymour, a member of the prominent Seymour family. This was reported to the Queen by the supposed groom's father, Edward Seymour, 1st Earl of Hertford. Arbella denied having any intention of marrying without the Queen's permission. In 1604, Sigismund III Vasa, King of Poland, sent an ambassador to England to ask for Arbella to be his wife. This offer was rejected.

== Marriage to Lord Beauchamp, imprisonment and death ==
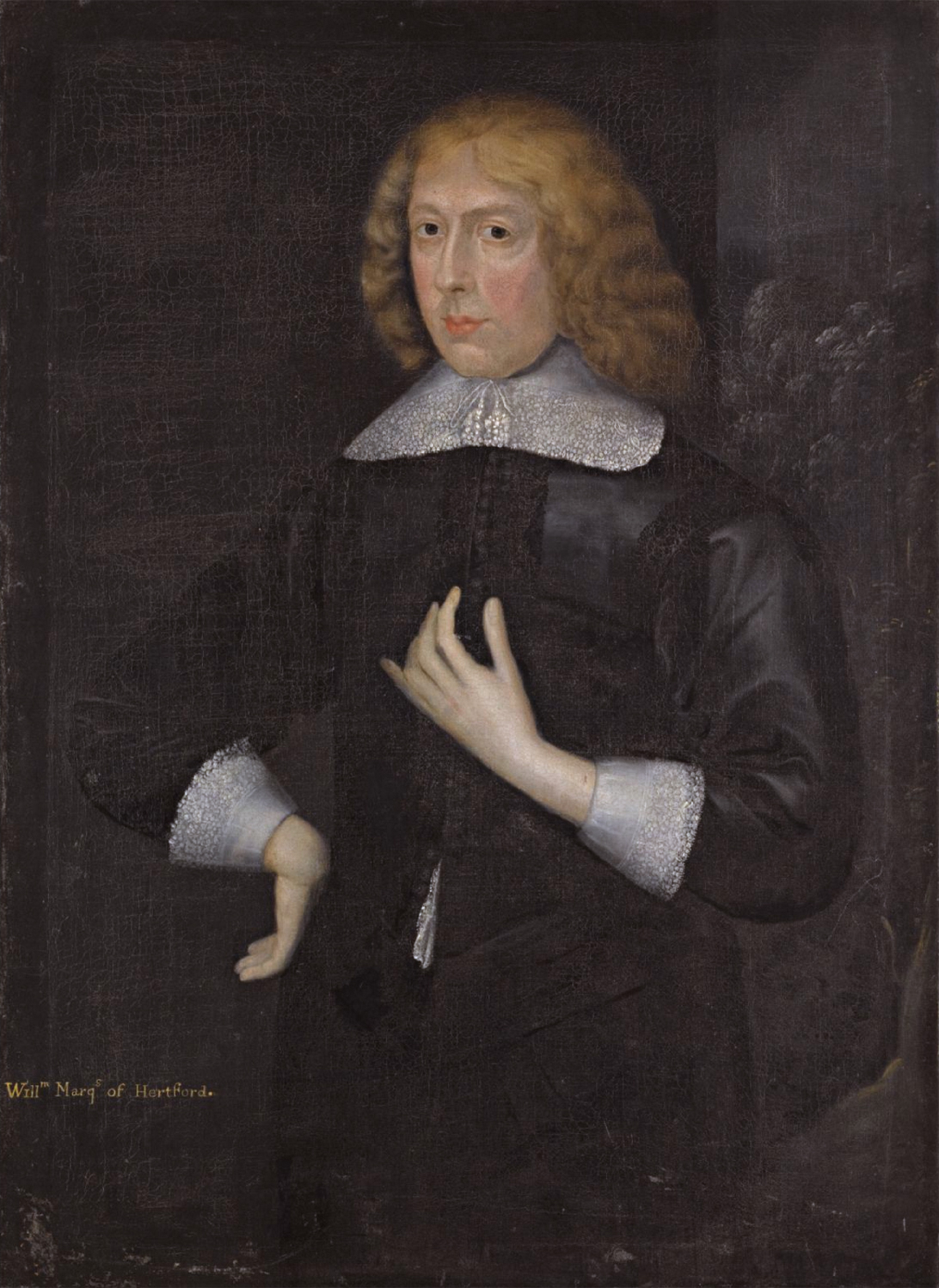
William, 2nd Duke of Somerset

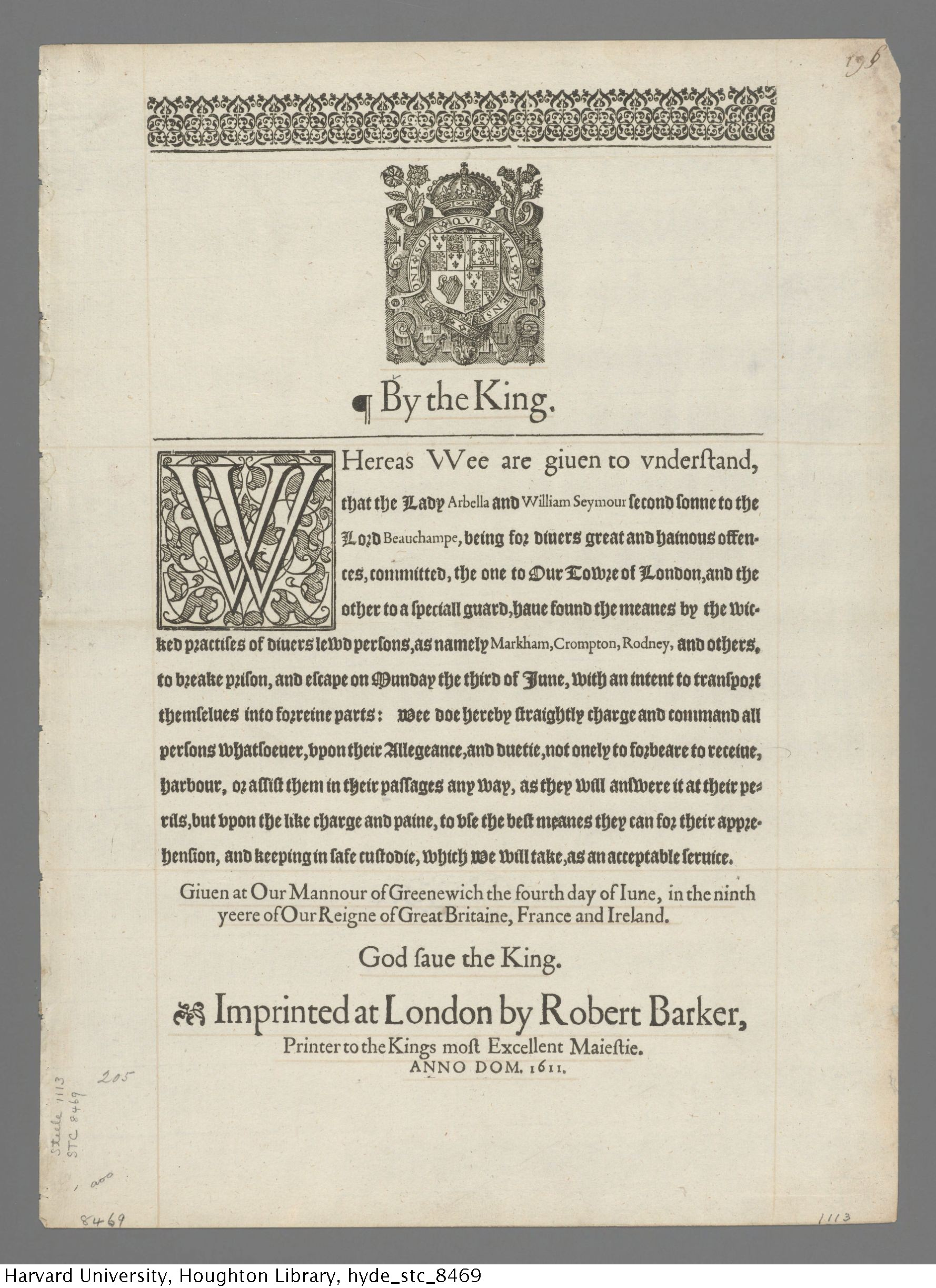
Royal warrant for arrest of Arbella, Lady Beauchamp, and Lord Beauchamp, 1611

Arbella refused to be chief mourner at the funeral of Elizabeth I. She came to the court of James VI and I in August 1603. She was given precedence as a Princess of the Blood. A Venetian diplomat Scaramelli noted that she carried the train of the dress of the queen, Anne of Denmark, when she went to chapel. In March 1608 Anne of Denmark, Prince Henry, and Arbella's friend the courtier John Elphinstone wrote to her at Sheffield to request that her lutenist Thomas Cutting be sent to the queen's brother Christian IV of Denmark. Arbella reluctantly agreed. Cutting soon returned to England but joined Prince Henry's household.

At the end of 1609, Arbella was in trouble for her involvement with an imposter, the "Prince of Moldavia" and other actions deemed suspicious, but she was forgiven, and the King gave her silver plate worth £200 as a New Year's Day gift. On 5 June 1610 Arbella danced in Samuel Daniel's masque Tethys' Festival, one of the festivities at the investiture of Prince Henry as Prince of Wales. She followed, in order of precedence, Anne of Denmark and Princess Elizabeth.

Arbella, who was fourth in line to the English throne, was in trouble again in 1610 for planning to marry William Seymour, then known as Lord Beauchamp, who later succeeded as 2nd Duke of Somerset. Lord Beauchamp was seventh-in-line, grandson of Lady Katherine Grey, a younger sister of Lady Jane Grey and a granddaughter of Mary Tudor, younger sister of King Henry VIII and Arbella's ancestor, Margaret Tudor. Under the circumstances, the King wondered whether the marriage was the prelude to an attempt to seize the Crown itself.

Although the couple at first denied that any arrangement existed between them, they later married in secret on 22 June 1610 at Greenwich Palace. For marrying without his permission, King James imprisoned them: Arbella in Sir Thomas Perry's house in Lambeth and Lord Beauchamp in the Tower of London. The couple had some liberty within those buildings, and some of Arbella's letters to Beauchamp and to the King during this period survive. When the King learned of her letters to Lord Beauchamp, however, he ordered Arbella's transfer to the custody of William James, Bishop of Durham. Arbella claimed to be ill, so her departure for Durham was delayed.

The couple used that delay to plan their escape. Arbella raised some money by selling a collection of embroideries made by Mary, Queen of Scots to her aunt for £850. Arbella, who was lodged at Highgate, dressed as a man to escape. This involved putting on French-fashioned hose over her petticoat, a man's doublet, a male wig over her hair, a black hat, black cloak, russet boots with red tops, and wearing a rapier. Imogen, the virtuous, cross-dressed heroine of William Shakespeare's play Cymbeline (1610–1611), has sometimes been read as a reference to Arbella, but the warrant for the couple's arrest is dated 3 June 1611 and Simon Forman recorded seeing a production of that play in April 1611. The black hat and riding safeguard worn by one woman reminded a witness, John Bright, of Moll Cutpurse. Beauchamp also disguised himself to escape from the Tower. Both told some of the servants they left behind that they were going in disguise to meet their partner.

Arbella went by boat on the Thames to Lee (in Kent). She sailed to France before Lord Beauchamp arrived. Beauchamp caught the next ship to Flanders. Arbella's ship was overtaken by King James's men just before it reached Calais. She was returned to England and imprisoned in the Tower of London. She never saw her husband again.

Later in the summer of 1610, Arbella embroidered a pair of gloves for Anne of Denmark and sent them to her lady-in-waiting Jane Drummond. She hoped to regain the queen's favour and kiss her hands again. Arbella expected to be released to attend the marriage of Princess Elizabeth in February 1613 and she bought pearls and a gown embroidered with pearls to wear from the jeweller Abraham der Kinderen. She was not invited and pawned and sold most of the pearls for funds a few months later. Abraham der Kinderen petitioned for the return of the gown after her death.

In her final days as a prisoner in the Tower of London, Arbella Seymour (her married name), refusing to eat, fell ill, and died on 25 September 1615. She was buried in Westminster Abbey on 29 September 1615. In the 19th century, during a search for the tomb of James VI and I, Arbella's lead coffin was found in the vault of Mary, Queen of Scots (her aunt by marriage) and placed directly on top of that of the Scots queen.

== Literary legacy ==
Over one hundred letters written by Arbella have survived. In 1993, a collection of them was published, edited by Sara Jayne Steen, providing details of her activities and ideas.

Emilia Lanier's 1611 poem Salve Deus Rex Judaeorum is dedicated to Arbella among other aristocratic women, though little read at the time. Lanier recalls a former personal friendship with Arbella that was unrequited; she addresses her as "Great learned Ladie ... whom long I have known but not known so much as I desired".

Felicia Hemans' poem " Arabella Stuart.", published in Records of Women, 1828, is about Arbella, imagining her thoughts as she died in prison.

The English novelist and historical biographer Doris Leslie wrote the book Wreath for Arabella in 1948.

Arbella is a prominent character in the 1972 BBC television drama series Mistress of Hardwick.

In 2005, Sarah Gristwood published Arbella: England's Lost Queen.

In 2016, Elizabeth Fremantle published The Girl in the Glass Tower, a biographical novel focused on the lives of Arbella and Emilia Lanier.

== Family tree ==
James III of Scotland	Henry VII of England
James IV of Scotland	Margaret Tudor	Archibald Douglas	Henry VIII of England	Mary Tudor ∞ Charles Brandon, 1st Duke of Suffolk
James V of Scotland	Margaret Douglas ∞ Charles Stuart, 1st Earl of Lennox	Mary I of England	Elizabeth I of England	Edward VI	Frances Brandon ∞ Henry Grey, Duke of Suffolk
Mary, Queen of Scots	Henry Stuart	Charles Stuart	Katherine Grey ∞ Edward Seymour, 1st Earl of Hertford	Jane Grey the "Nine Days Queen"
Edward Seymour
James VI and I	Arbella Stuart	William Seymour

=== Ancestry ===
Ancestors of Lady Arbella Stuart

8. John Stewart, 3rd Earl of Lennox
4. Matthew Stewart, 4th Earl of Lennox
9. Elizabeth Stewart
2. Charles Stuart, 1st/5th Earl of Lennox
10. Archibald Douglas, 6th Earl of Angus
5. Margaret Douglas
11. Margaret Tudor
1. Lady Arbella Stuart
12. Thomas Cavendish
6. Sir William Cavendish
13. Alice Smith
3. Elizabeth Cavendish
14. John Hardwick
7. Bess of Hardwick
15. Elizabeth Leeke

== Bibliography ==
- Elizabeth Cooper. The Life and Letters of Lady Arabella Stuart (1866)
- Blanche Christabel Hardy. Arbella Stuart: A Biography (1913)
- P. M. Handover. Arbella Stuart: Royal Lady of Hardwick and Cousin to King James (1957)
- Conyers Read. Lord Burghley and Queen Elizabeth (1960)
- David N. Durant. Arbella Stuart: A Rival to the Queen (1978)
- Ruth Talbot Plimpton. Mary Dyer: Biography of a Rebel Quaker (1994)
- Sarah Jayne Steen, ed. The Letters of Lady Arbella Stuart (1994)
- Sarah Gristwood. Arbella: England's Lost Queen (2003)
- Terry Kilburn. Hardwick's Royal Princess: Arbella Stuart, 1575-1615 (2013, 2015)
