= P. M. Handover =

English writer

Phyllis Margaret Handover (1923-1974), who published as P. M. Handover, was an English writer on typography.

Her obituary describes her thus: "She was a rather frail-looking woman, with a gentle, refined appearance and soft, low voice which imperfectly concealed an incisive, uncompromising intellect and an iron determination to go her own way."

== Education ==
According to her obituary, Handover attended Brentwood High School and St Anne's College, Oxford, at that time called the Society of Oxford Home Students.

== Life and work ==
Early in her career, Handover tried her hand at fiction, prompting a publisher's reader to recommend she turn to factual writing. She then wrote historical biographies on Lady Arbella Stuart and Robert Cecil, 1st Earl of Salisbury.

Interested in further pursuing historical studies, she joined The Times as a research assistant to Stanley Morison, who recognized her ability and encouraged her to write. Working with Morison, she developed an interest in typography, writing a number of scholarly articles. She gave a series of lectures at St Bride Library, published in 1960 as Printing in London : from 1476 to modern times.

== Works ==
- The Site of the Office of the Times: the history from 1276 to 1956 of the site in Blackfriars, consisting of Printing House Square ... and other thoroughfares, the whole now being the freehold property of the Times Publishing Company limited, Times Publishing Co., 1956
- Arbella Stuart, royal lady of Hardwick and cousin to King James, 1957
- The second Cecil: the rise to power, 1563-1604 of Sir Robert Cecil, late first earl of Salisbury, 1959
- Stanley Morison: a second handlist 1950-1959, 1959
- Printing in London : from 1476 to modern times: competitive practice and technical invention in the trade of book and Bible printing, periodical production, jobbing &c, 1960
- A History of the London Gazette, 1665-1965, 1965
