= Whorlton Castle =

Castle ruins in North Yorkshire, England

- Whorlton, North Yorkshire, England
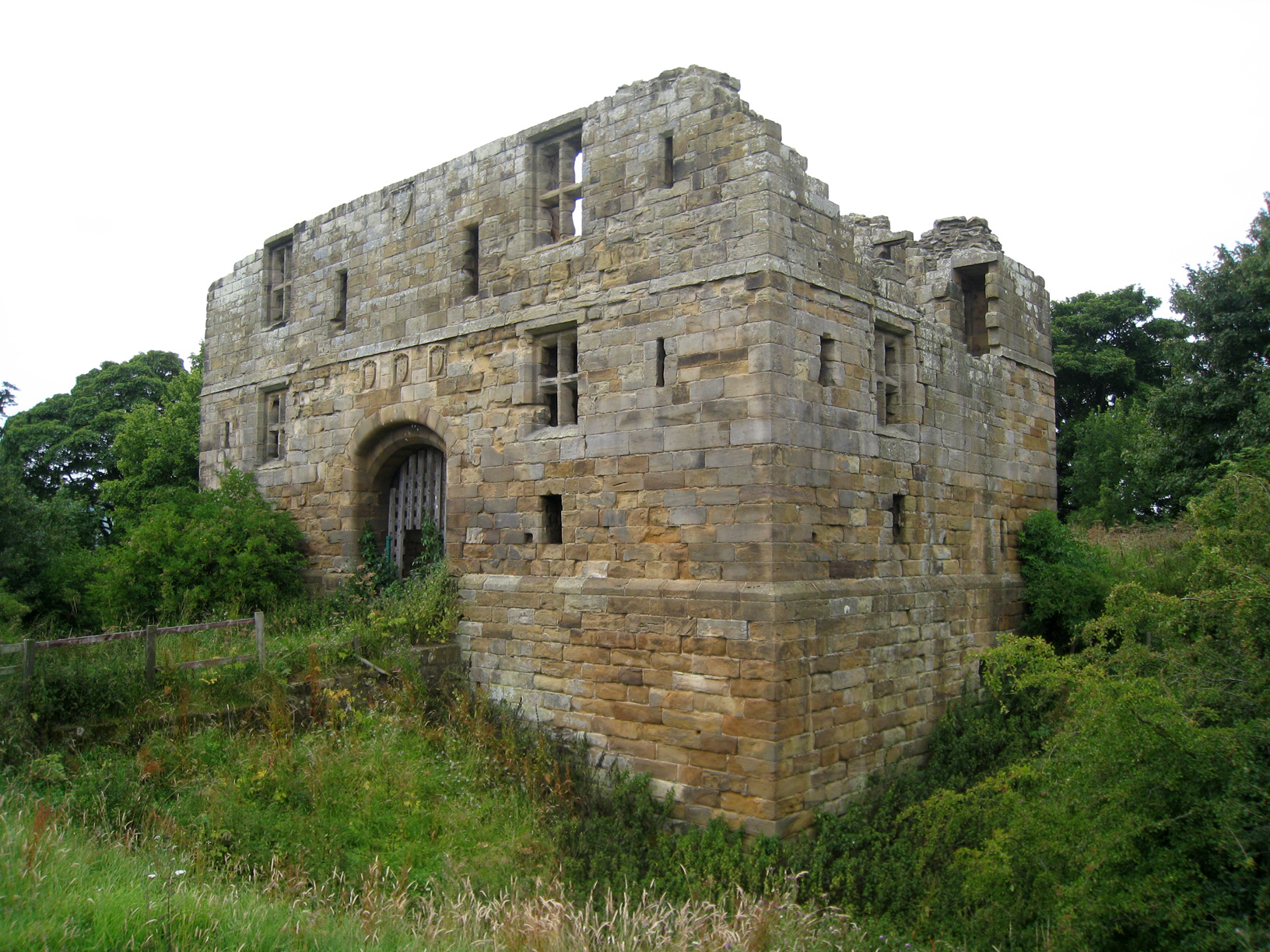
- Gatehouse

Site information
- Type: Medieval castle

Location
- Coordinates: 54°24′55″N 1°15′36″W

Site history
- Built: early 12th century

Whorlton Castle is a ruined medieval castle situated near the abandoned village of Whorlton (at grid reference NZ4802) in North Yorkshire, England. It was established in the early 12th century as a Norman motte-and-bailey fortification associated with the nearby settlement. The castle is an unusual example of a motte-and-bailey that remained in use throughout the Middle Ages and into the early modern period.

Built to overlook an important road on the western edge of the North York Moors, the castle fell into ruin as early as the mid-14th century. The site nonetheless continued to be inhabited until at least the early 17th century. Little now remains of the castle itself, other than the remnants of some cellars or undercrofts. The ruined shell of a 14th-century gatehouse still survives, albeit in fairly poor condition. It is a listed building and is privately owned, but can be visited by the public.

== History ==
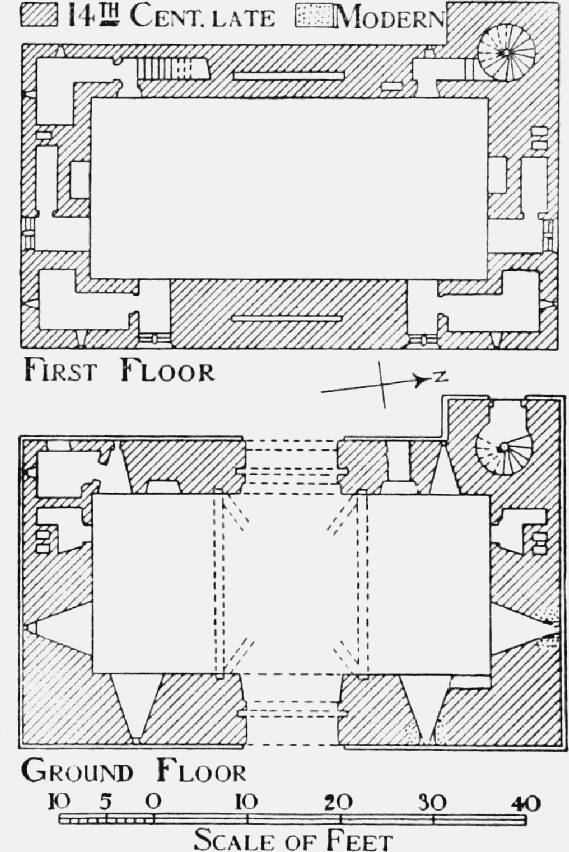
Plan of the gatehouse of Whorlton Castle

The castle was established in the early 12th century at the edge of Castle Bank, a ridge between the villages of Faceby and Swainby, overlooking a small valley through which the road between Thirsk and Stokesley runs. In the 13th century, it was referred to variously as Hwernelton or Potto Castle (the village of Potto is part of the same parish). At the time of the Domesday Book in 1086, Whorlton was recorded as belonging to Robert, Count of Mortain, the half-brother of William the Conqueror. It subsequently passed to the de Meynell family, who founded the castle.

It is unclear when exactly the castle was built, but in its first phase, it would have consisted of a wooden fortress on a roughly square motte measuring some 60 metres (200 ft) by 50 metres (160 ft). The motte was surrounded by a dry ditch up to 20 metres (66 ft) wide by 5 metres (16 ft) deep, with an outer bank standing up to 2.5 metres (8.2 ft) high. Most of the ditch is still present, but its southeast quadrant has been obliterated by a modern road. It would have adjoined a fortified enclosure that included the village and church.

The castle fell into disrepair or was dismantled during the first part of the 14th century; an account of 1343 describes it as being a ruin. In the mid-14th century, it passed by marriage to John Darcy, Lord Darcy of Knayth, who had close associations with the royal court. Darcy carried out substantial changes to the castle and levelled the motte to provide a base for a new keep with a fortified gatehouse, built a short distance to the east. It is not clear whether there was a curtain wall – there is no evidence of one on the ground – but the castle would have been extremely hard to defend without one. The lack of evidence of a curtain wall may simply be the result of centuries of stone-robbing. Whorlton Castle remained in the hands of the Darcys until 1418, when the death of Philip Darcy, 6th Baron Darcy de Knayth, resulted in Whorlton being inherited by his daughter, Elizabeth Darcy, who was married to Sir James Strangeways. The Strangeways held on to the castle, until a dispute between heirs in 1541 led to it becoming a possession of the Crown.

King Henry VIII of England later granted the castle and estate to Matthew Stewart, 4th Earl of Lennox, whose eldest son was Henry Stuart, Lord Darnley. Margaret Douglas, Countess of Lennox, wrote to Mary, Queen of Scots, in the autumn of 1561, possibly from Whorlton Castle, to propose a marriage between Mary and her son Darnley. Although local tradition claims that the castle was where their marriage contract was signed in 1565, this is erroneous; the contract was actually signed at Stirling Castle in Scotland. At some point in the late 16th or early 17th century, a house was built by the Lennox family adjoining the northwest end of the gatehouse. The house was sketched in 1725 by Samuel Buck and is depicted as a large two-storied building with gabled dormer windows set into a steeply pitched roof. No trace of the house's structure now remains, though its roofline is still visible on the north side of the gatehouse. The castle eventually returned to the possession of the Crown, but fell into disrepair, and by 1600 the building was described as "old and ruinous".

Whorlton Castle and manor were then given to Edward Bruce, 1st Lord Kinloss (later Lord Bruce of Kinloss), in 1603, and the title of Lord Bruce of Whorlton was bestowed on his second son, Thomas Bruce, 1st Earl of Elgin, in 1641. Thomas's son, Robert Bruce, became the first Earl of Ailesbury in 1664. By the early 19th century, the ruins of the castle's keep had largely disappeared, as depicted in a lithograph made at this time. The Bruce family retained the castle and manor until the late 19th century, when they were sold to James Emerson of Easby Hall. In 1875, a large quantity of the castle's stonework was removed to build Swainby's village church.

The castle is currently privately owned, having been bought by Osbert Peake, 1st Viscount Ingleby, in the mid-20th century as part of a shooting estate. It acquired listed status in 1928, and is a Grade I listed site. The gatehouse received structural repairs from the Ministry of Works in the 1960s, but has otherwise largely been left open to the elements.

== Description of buildings and surroundings ==
The mid-14th century gatehouse is the main surviving relic of Whorlton Castle. It is now a roofless and floorless shell, three storeys high, constructed from sandstone ashlar and built on a rectangular plan with a length and breadth of 17.68 m (58.0 ft) by 10 m (33 ft). The height of the surviving walls varies between 8.5 m (28 ft) to about 6 m (20 ft) The walls vary in thickness between 2.3 m (7.5 ft) to 1.73 m (5.7 ft). None of the interior walls or floors have survived.

Two large segment-arched entrances are present on either side of the gatehouse, flanked by cross-windows. Each entrance is approximately 3 m (9.8 ft) wide by 3.3 m (11 ft) high. Above the east (main) entrance is a row of three carved shields in cusped panels. The shields present the arms of Darcy (centre) flanked by Meynell (right) and Gray (left), the latter reflecting the marriage of Philip Darcy to Elizabeth Gray in the late 14th century. Above the shields is a further single shield that shows the arms of Darcy and Meynell impaled, reflecting the original marriage that united the families and brought the castle into the hands of the Darcys. The entrances would originally have been blocked by portcullises made of wood or metal that could be raised or lowered by winches set into the gatehouse walls. The grooves for the portcullises are still visible today.

After passing through the entrances, visitors would have crossed through a vaulted central passage, some elements of which can still be seen. On either side were a number of large rooms with smaller mural chambers (small rooms set within the walls) – probably guardrooms – and a great hall would have occupied the entire top floor. The remains of fireplaces are still visible on the ground and first floors. A vice or spiral staircase enclosed by a tower projecting out from the northwest wall gave access to the upper floors. It could not be accessed from within the ground floor of the gatehouse but was accessed from a round-headed doorway set into the north-west wall. The staircase can still be followed up to the remnants of the first floor, though the actual flooring is no longer present. On the outside of the gatehouse's north-west wall, the roofline of a now-vanished building can still be seen.

Ruins of Whorlton Castle
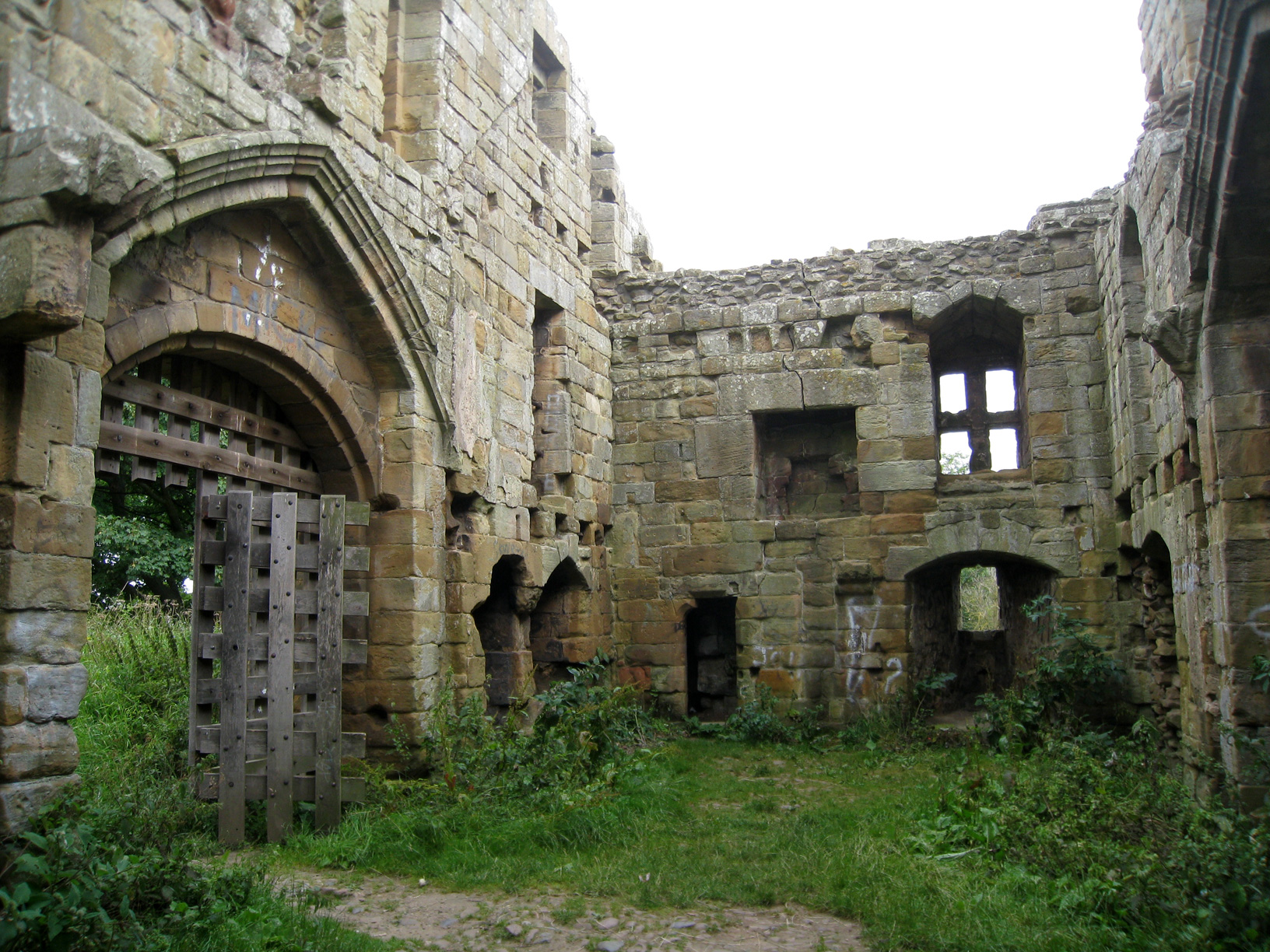
Interior of the gatehouse at Whorlton Castle

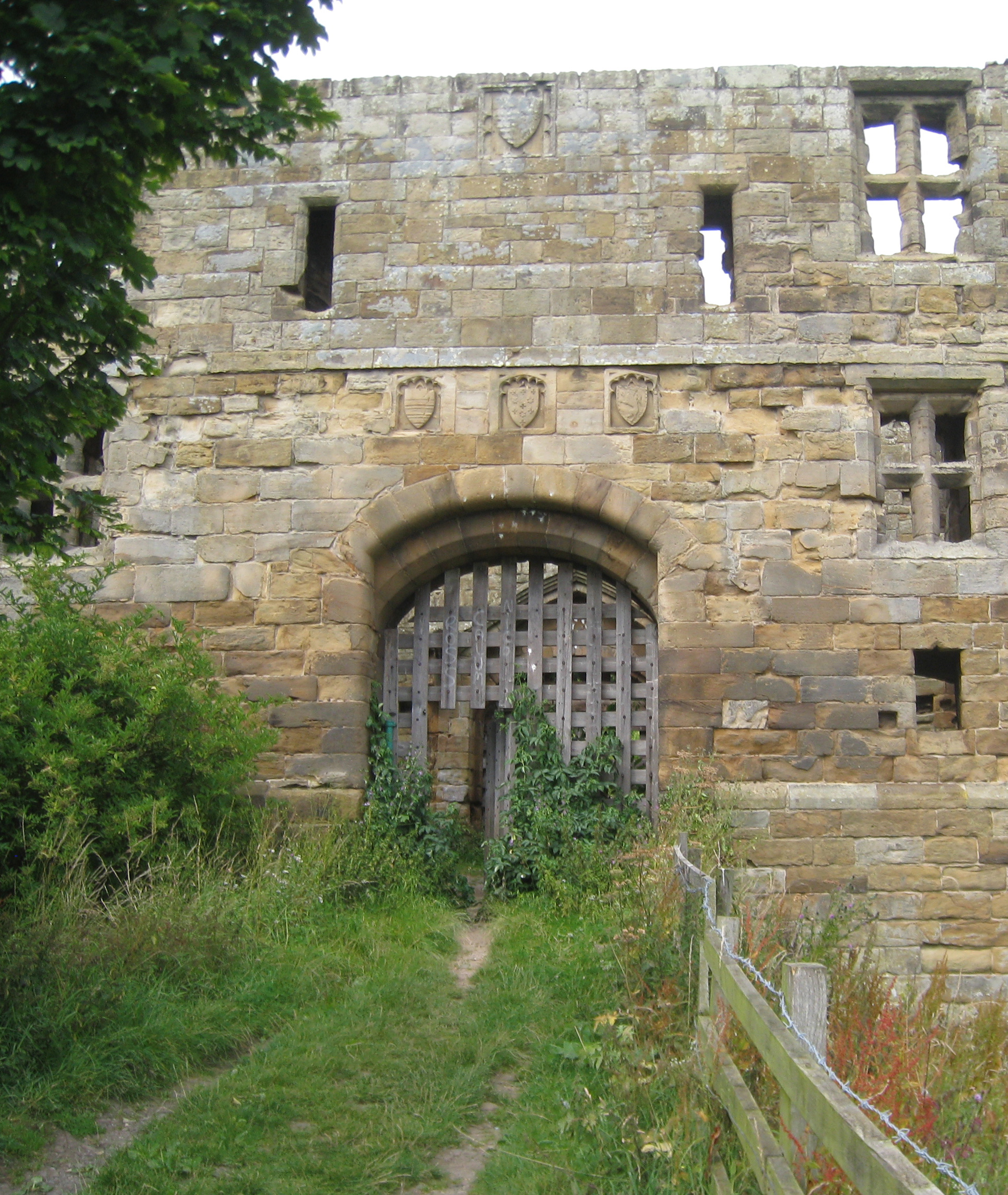
East entrance to the gatehouse, displaying the shields of the Darcys, Meynells and Grays.

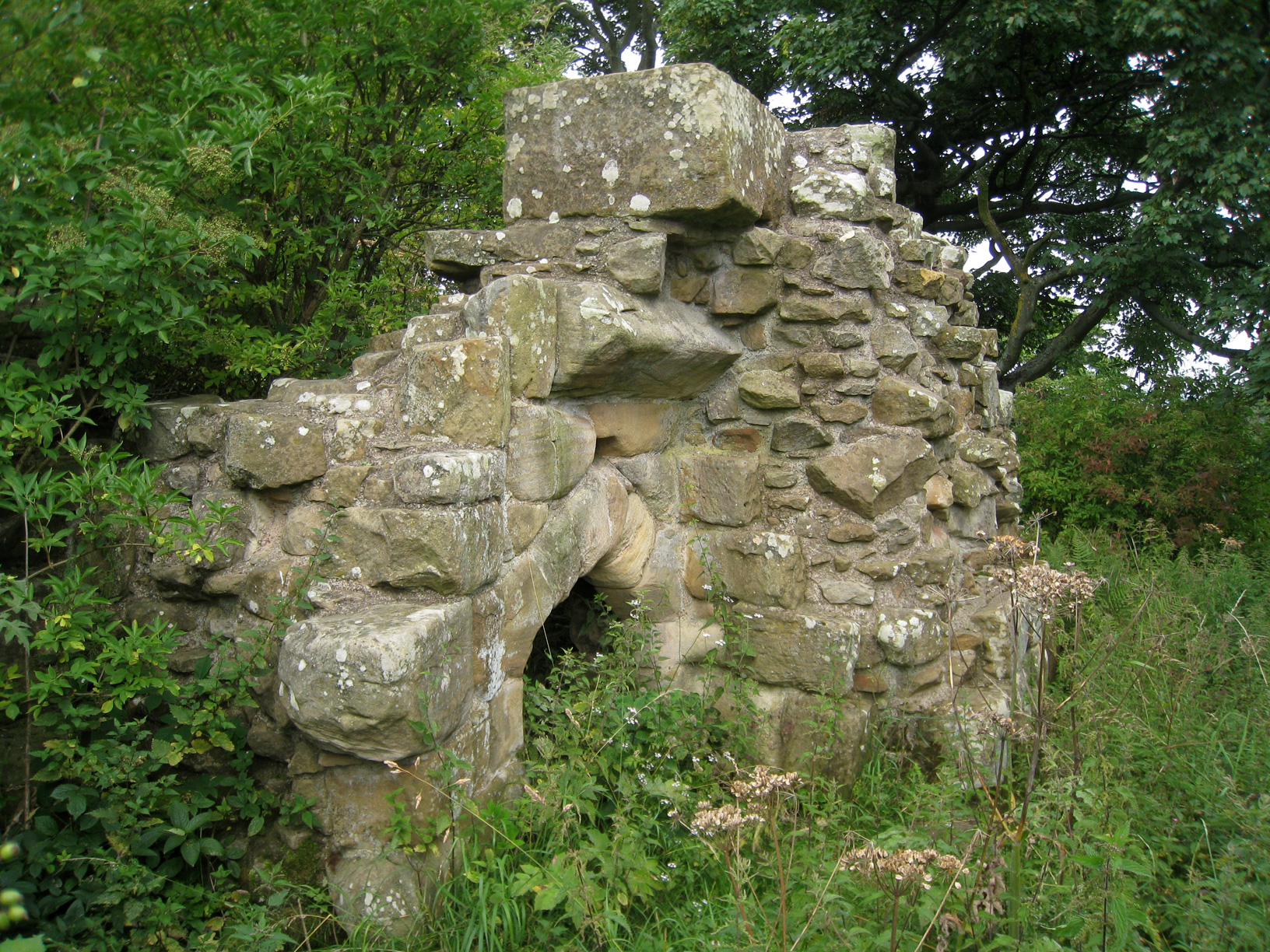
Fragmentary remnant of Whorlton Castle's main building

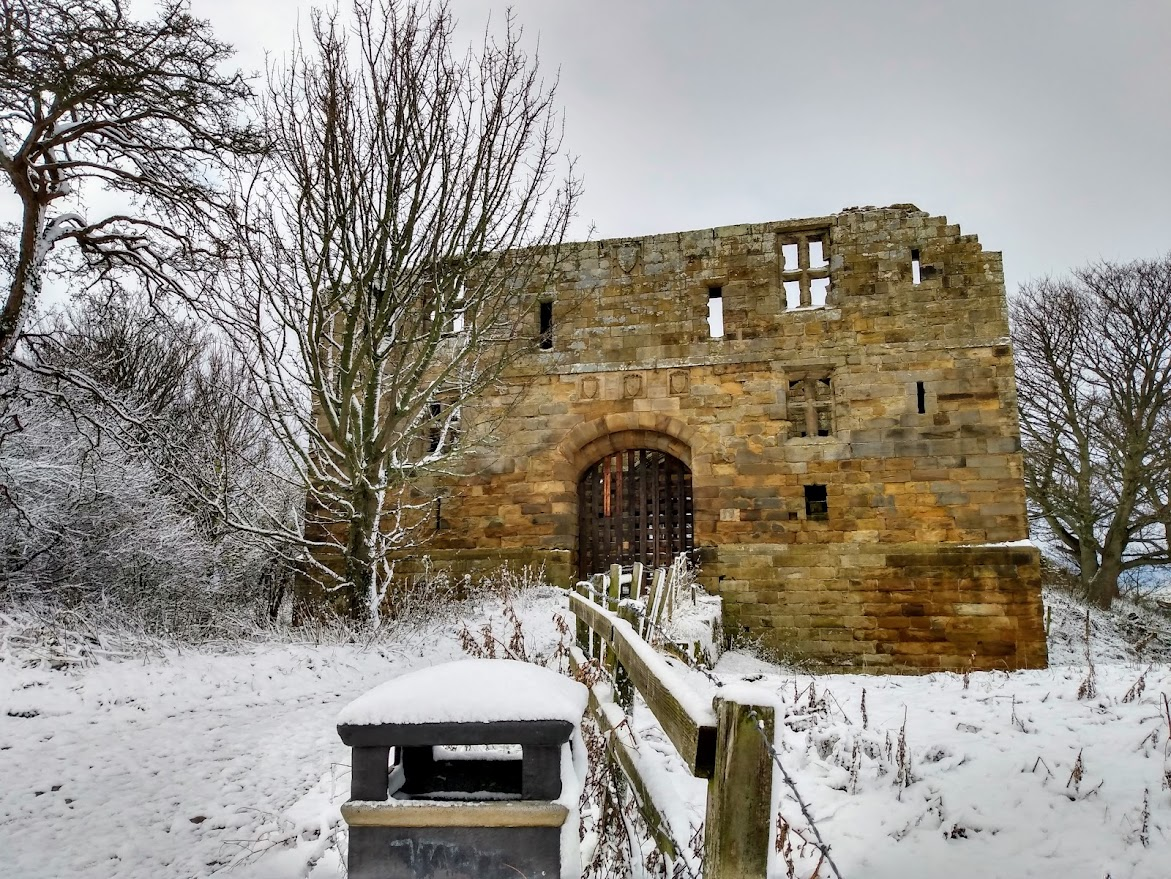
The gatehouse in the snow

The castle's keep was located approximately 22 metres (72 ft) further west at the other end of the bailey. The only elements of it now remaining are fragments of vaulted cellars or undercrofts, the largest of which measures some 9 metres (30 ft) by 4 metres (13 ft). They are thought to be of Norman origin and as such may represent the oldest extant remains on the site. In the mid-19th century a local farmer reportedly used the castle cellars as pig sties. The cellars were overgrown but are now much tidier and are easily accessible (but via small doors and steps).

A large area of the surrounding landscape is also associated with the castle. Much of the land was cultivated during the Middle Ages and traces of ploughing are still visible. The area immediately adjoining the castle was landscaped during the late medieval period, when ornamental gardens were built in two rectangular enclosures a short way to the east of the bailey. Each was some 40 metres (130 ft) by 20 metres (66 ft) and was surrounded by earthen banks about 1 metre (3.3 ft) high. To the east of the gardens was an extended rectangular pond 190 metres (620 ft) long, 20 metres (66 ft) wide and up to 3 metres (9.8 ft) deep. It has been suggested that it might have been a fish pond, but its size makes this possibility an uncertain one. A deer park was laid out to the south of the castle where, it is said, Edward II once hunted. The landscape and the site of the deserted village of Whorlton are included with the castle as part of a scheduled ancient monument.

== Conservation plans ==
The castle gatehouse is in poor condition and has been added to English Heritage's Heritage at Risk Register. The building has repeatedly been vandalised and is suffering the effects of the weather. The site is within the boundaries of the North York Moors National Park, and the National Park Authority, English Heritage and the site owner have collaborated to develop a plan to conserve the site. A report produced for the park authority in 2005 examined several options, including retaining the building as ruins but improving security by employing a custodian, converting the gatehouse into a liveable property for use as a house or holiday home, or establishing a local community group to help manage and maintain the site.

The option of converting the gatehouse was recommended. The report concluded that "retention of the status quo is not felt to be an acceptable option, due to continuing damage through vandalism to the historic fabric and archaeology, together with the impaired public enjoyment and the uneconomic nature of future repairs and maintenance to the site." English Heritage part-funded a feasibility study to assess the prospects of turning the gatehouse into a home. However, these plans fell through due to the collapse into administration of the Vivat Trust, which had proposed the conversion.

== See also ==
- Castles in Great Britain and Ireland
- List of castles in England
- Grade I listed buildings in North Yorkshire (district)
- Listed buildings in Whorlton, North Yorkshire
