= Swainby =

Village in North Yorkshire, England

Coordinates: 54.4114°N 1.2658°W

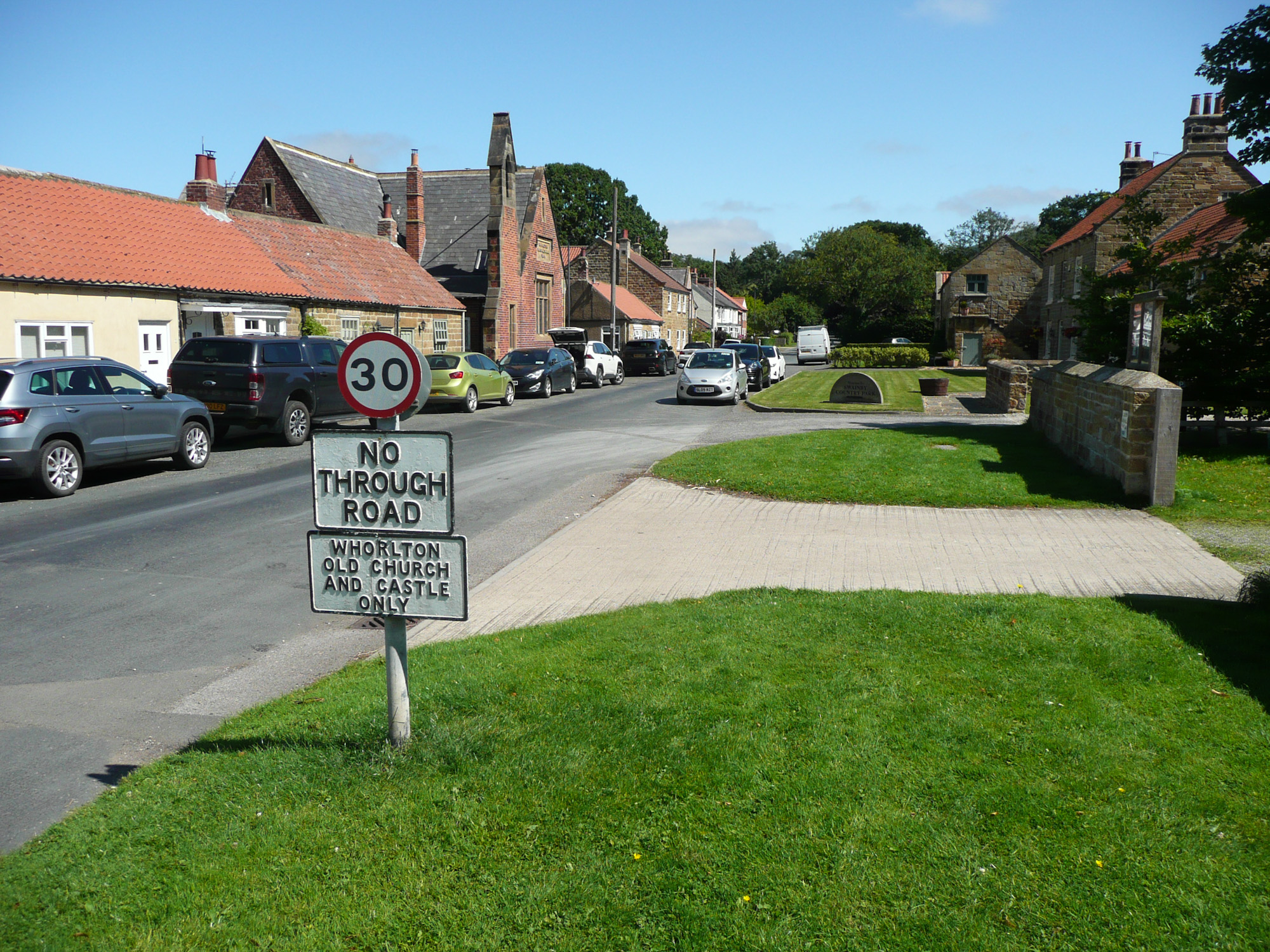
- Church Lane

- Location within North Yorkshire
- Population: 1,820 (2011 census)
- OS grid reference: NZ477019
  - London: 215 mi (346 km) south
- Civil parish: Whorlton
- Unitary authority: North Yorkshire
- Ceremonial county: North Yorkshire
- Region: Yorkshire and the Humber
- Country: England
- Sovereign state: United Kingdom
- Post town: NORTHALLERTON
- Postcode district: DL6
- Dialling code: 01642
- Police: North Yorkshire
- Fire: North Yorkshire
- Ambulance: Yorkshire
- UK Parliament: Richmond and Northallerton

Swainby is a village in the county of North Yorkshire, England. It is situated on the A172 road, 8 miles (13 km) north-east from Northallerton and 5 miles (8 km) south-west from the small market town of Stokesley.

== Geography ==
Swainby is located at the north-western corner of the North York Moors National Park. The characteristics of the village and the surrounding area consist of traditional Yorkshire dry stone walls, hills, sheep, heather and moorland. The name of the village derives from Old Norse, Sveins and by which means the village next to the swans or the land of Svein's people.

The village is close to the ruins of Whorlton Castle; Swainby appears to have been built after its abandonment, possibly due to the Black Death (or some other disease) leaving the inhabitants of the castle low in number in 1428.

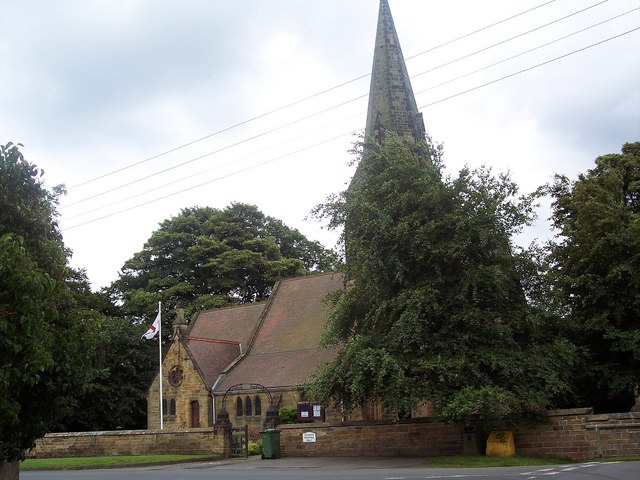
Holy Cross Church

Holy Cross Church (Church of England) was designed by T. H. Wyatt; he was commissioned to do it by the Marquess of Ailesbury. It is in the Early English style and constructed of locally quarried stone. The grade II listed church was consecrated on 4 October 1877.

In the 19th century the housing of miners who worked the nearby hills for ironstone and jet led to an expansion of the village.

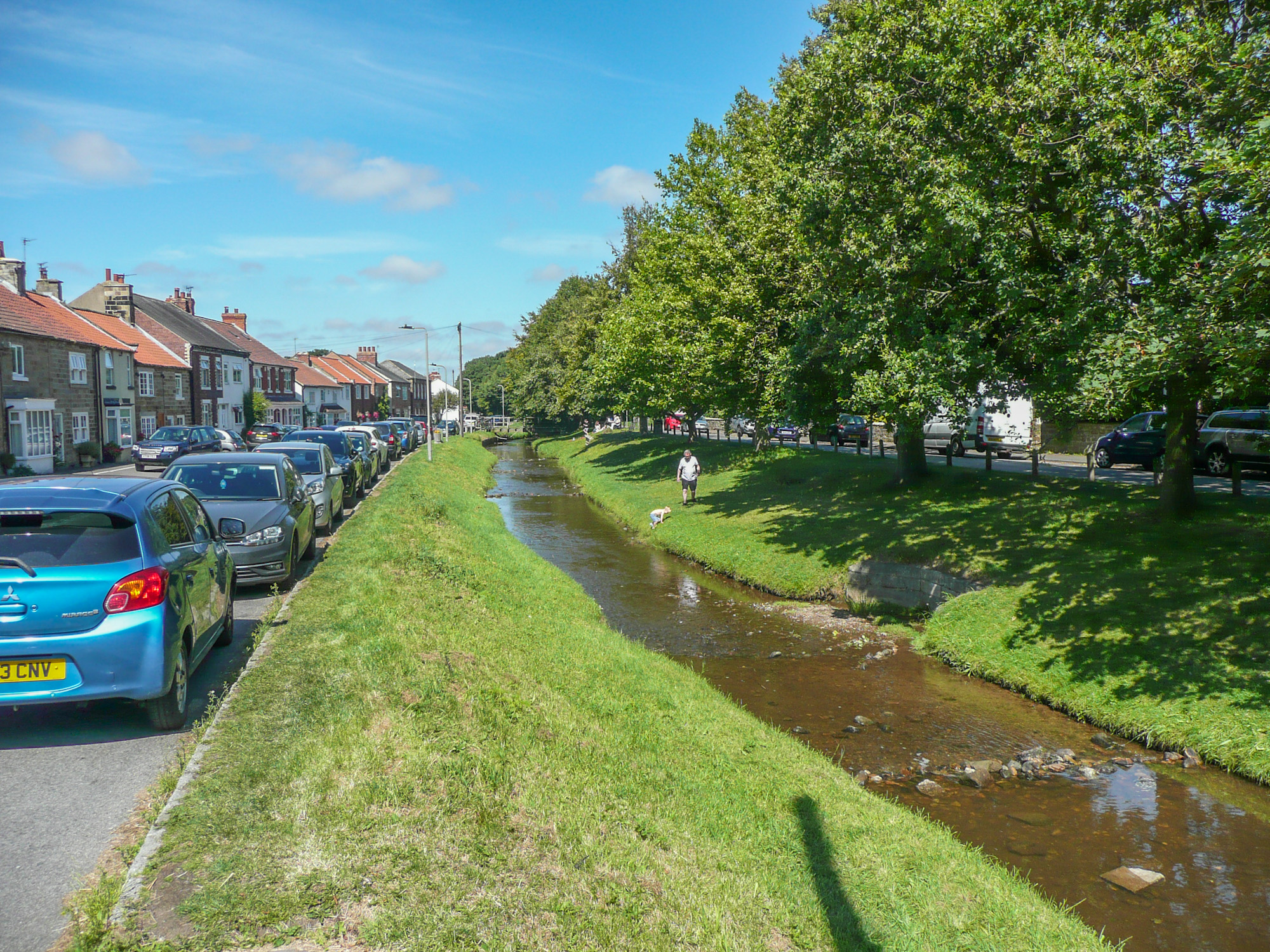
Scugdale Beck

Scugdale Beck, a tributary of the River Leven, cuts northwards through the village with two roads either side of the water and houses built on both sides.

Swainby contains two public houses, "The Blacksmiths Arms" and "The Black Horse", and a caravan park with farm house.

== Governance ==
Swainby is in Whorlton civil parish, the village is presently larger than the parish's namesake therefore the electoral ward is under Swainby's name. The ward's population was 1,820 at the 2011 census.

From 1974 to 2023 it was part of the Hambleton District. It is now administered by the unitary North Yorkshire Council.

== Transport ==
Swainby was the site where an old drover's road entered the North York Moors. The road continued south to Sutton Bank where it fed into the prehistoric road that is now the A170. Cattle from Ryedale were brought up to Swainby to be sold in the village.

The village is just south of the A172 road which connects the A19 road with Middlesbrough bypassing Stokesley. The village lies on the Northallerton to Stokesley bus route.

A railway ran through the village between 1857 and 1899. It connected with Potto railway station on the Picton–Battersby line but it was not open to passenger traffic, being used to move ironstone from Whorlton to the smelters on Teesside only.

== See also ==
- Listed buildings in Whorlton, North Yorkshire
- Robert Aske
