= Elizabeth Cooper (historian) =

English historian and biographer

Elizabeth Cooper (fl. 1865–1874) was an English historian and biographer of the mid-Victorian period, known for three publications on the history of America, on Lady Arbella Stuart, and on Thomas Wentworth, 1st Earl of Strafford.

== Biography ==
Little appears to be known of Cooper apart from her publications, and a few reviews and commentaries relating to them; she appears to have been unmarried, at least during the period in which she was published.

In 1865, she published A Popular History of America, subtitled From the Discovery by Columbus to the Establishment of the Federal Republic of the United States In Three Periods: I. The Discovery and Conquest of the West Indies and South America II. The Colonization of the United States III. The War of Independence and the Establishment of the Federal Government. The history, covering both the north and south of the continent, runs to 527 pages and includes two fold-out maps.

In the following year, 1866, she published a two-volume The Life and Letters of Lady Arabella Stuart, based on her studies of Stuart-related papers held by Thomas Phillipps, Richard Monckton Milnes, 1st Baron Houghton, George Digby Wingfield Digby and others. The Westminster and Foreign Quarterly Review described the work as a carefully painted portrait, built on 'numerous original and hitherto unpublished documents', and written with 'quiet taste and sober treatment'.

She next published The Life of Thomas Wentworth, Earl of Stafford in 1874; the Oxford Dictionary of National Biography speculates that the gap between this and the Arabella Stuart might arise out of illness; her dedication in Stafford is to Edward Lane, a medical doctor and hydrotherapist who ran establishments at Moor Park, Farnham and Sudbrook Park, Petersham; Cooper evidently believed he had rescued her from certain death. The two-volume Stafford was the first scholarly treatise on Wentworth, and was received with generally good reviews.

== Works ==
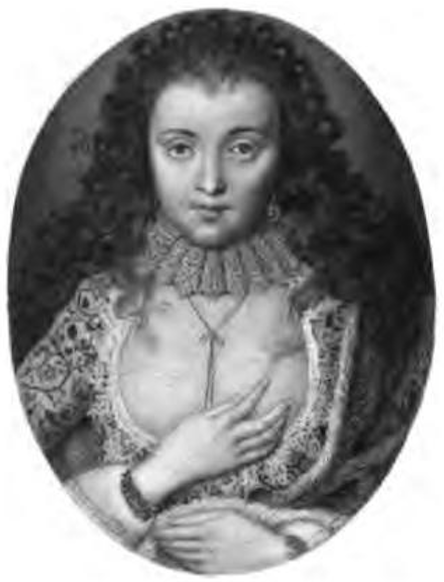
Engraving of Lady Arbella Stuart, commissioned by Cooper and based on a miniature in the possession of George Digby Wingfield Digby

- A Popular History of America (1865)
- The Life and Letters of Lady Arabella Stuart (1866)
  - volume 1
  - volume 2
- The Life of Thomas Wentworth, Earl of Stafford (1874)
  - volume 1
  - volume 2
