= Whorlton, North Yorkshire =

Hamlet and civil parish in North Yorkshire, England

Coordinates: 54.415150°N 1.255170°W

Whorlton
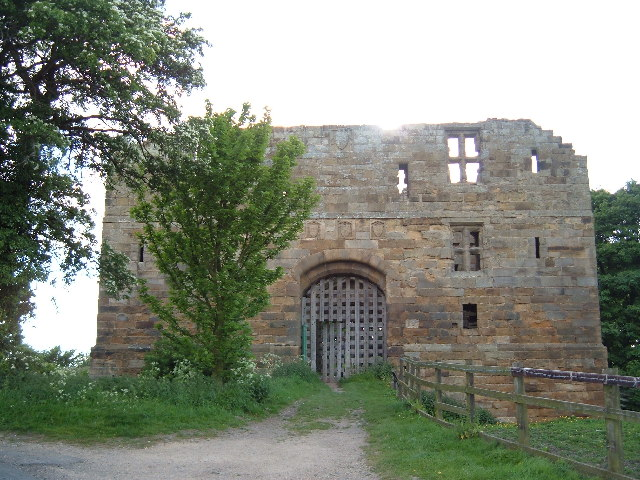
- Whorlton Castle gatehouse

- Location within North Yorkshire
- Population: 597 (2011 census)
- OS grid reference: NZ484024
- Civil parish: Whorlton
- Unitary authority: North Yorkshire
- Ceremonial county: North Yorkshire
- Region: Yorkshire and the Humber
- Country: England
- Sovereign state: United Kingdom
- Post town: NORTHALLERTON
- Postcode district: DL6
- Police: North Yorkshire
- Fire: North Yorkshire
- Ambulance: Yorkshire

Whorlton is a hamlet and civil parish in North Yorkshire, England. It is very near Swainby and the A19, and 6 miles south west of Stokesley. It is the site of a deserted medieval village, a scheduled monument, the remains of Whorlton Castle and the Church of the Holy Rood. From 1974 to 2023 it was part of the Hambleton District. It is now administered by the unitary North Yorkshire Council.

== History ==
In 1810 a hoard of Roman silver coins and metalwork, the Whorlton Hoard, was found near Whorl Hill.

The name is of Old English or Old Norse origin. It means the farmstead near Whorl Hill, the "round-topped" hill, from hwyrfel "circle". The place was first mentioned in the Domesday Book of 1086.

Whorlton Castle was built by Robert de Meynell as a typical 12th century motte and bailey Norman castle. A gatehouse was added in the 14th century. The only remains visible today are the grade I listed gatehouse and traces of the grade II* listed undercrofts (or cellars) of the main building. Due to vandalism access to the site is restricted.

== Civil parish ==
The parish includes the much larger settlement of Swainby, and an extensive area of moorland in the Cleveland Hills south and east of Swainby. In 2011 the population of the parish was 597.

== See also ==
- Listed buildings in Whorlton, North Yorkshire
