= Charles Stuart, 5th Earl of Lennox =

Anglo-Scottish nobleman (1557–1576)

Charles Stuart
- 1st Earl of Lennox
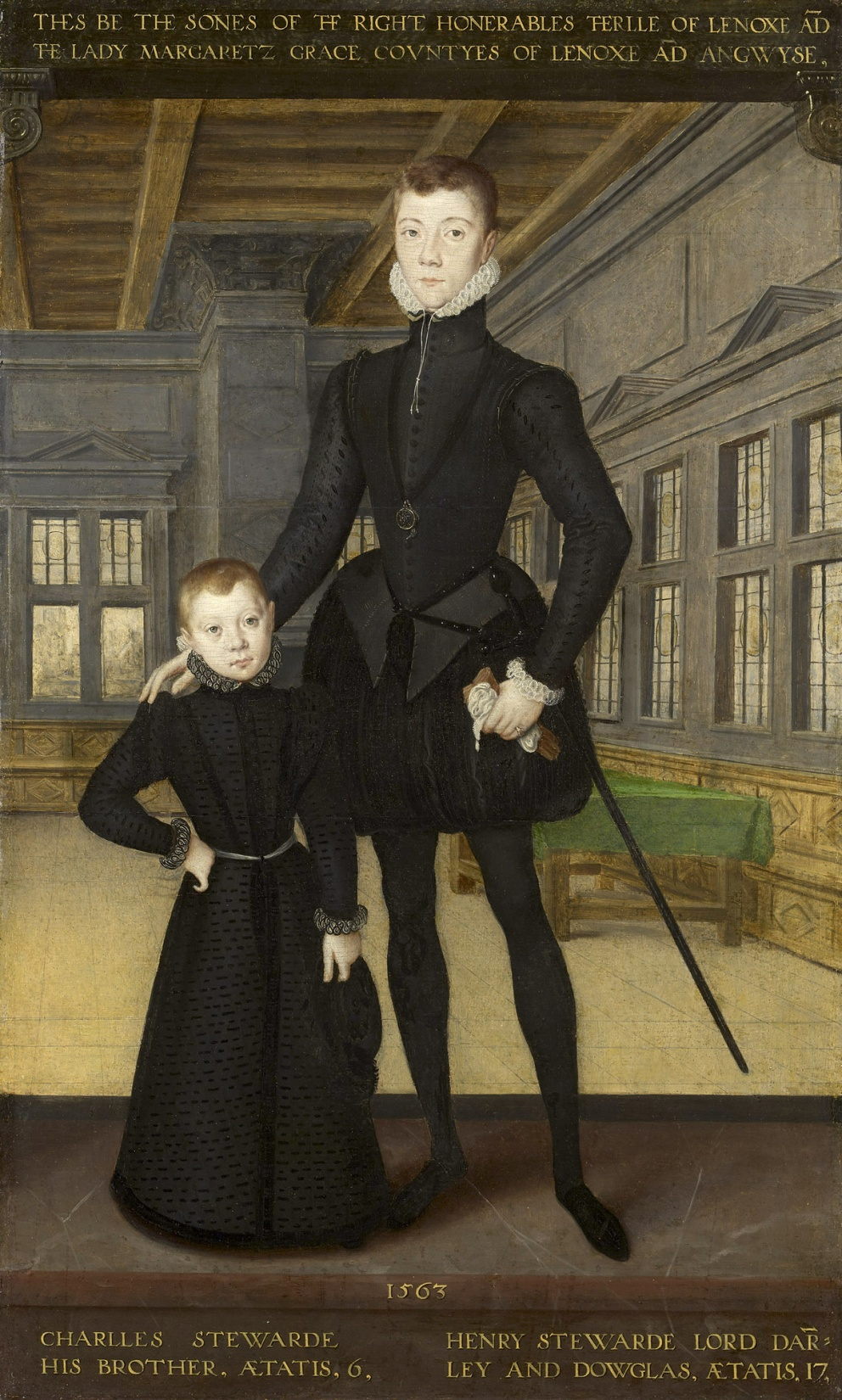
- Charles Stuart, Earl of Lennox, and his brother Henry Stuart, Lord Darnley
- Born: April or May 1557; Nottinghamshire, England
- Died: April 1576 (aged 18–19); London, England
- Buried: Westminster Abbey
- Family: Stewart of Darnley
- Spouse: Elizabeth Cavendish (m. 1574)
- Issue: Lady Arbella Stuart
- Parents: Matthew Stewart, 4th Earl of Lennox; Margaret Douglas

Charles Stuart, 1st Earl of Lennox (April or May 1557 – April 1576), was the fourth son of Matthew Stewart, 4th Earl of Lennox and Lady Margaret Douglas, daughter of Margaret Tudor and granddaughter of King Henry VII of England. His brother was Henry Stuart, Lord Darnley, husband of Mary, Queen of Scots. He was the uncle of James VI and I.

== Life and family ==
The 4th Earl of Lennox until his death in 1571 was regent for his young grandson, King James VI of Scotland. Charles's elder brother and James's father was Henry Stuart, Lord Darnley, who had died in 1567. As a result, the Earldom of Lennox on the death of the 4th Earl was inherited by James VI and the title merged with the Crown. However, shortly after his father's death, the title was bestowed on Charles, amounting to a new creation of the title albeit in a cadet (younger) branch of the same family.

Charles proceeded to incur the displeasure of Queen Elizabeth I of England by a hasty marriage to Elizabeth Cavendish, daughter of Bess of Hardwick, apparently at his mother's instigation. The couple had one child, Lady Arbella Stuart. After the death of the 5th Earl, King James, who was still a minor, acquired the earldom despite the intervention of Queen Elizabeth I of England on her behalf. Lady Arbella Stuart married William Seymour. She was later imprisoned in the Tower of London and died there in 1615.

Charles Stuart died in early April 1576 from consumption.

Peerage of Scotland
New title	Earl of Lennox; 1572–1576	Extinct
