= Margaret Douglas, Countess of Lennox =

English noblewoman (1515–1578)

Lady Margaret Douglas
- Countess of Lennox
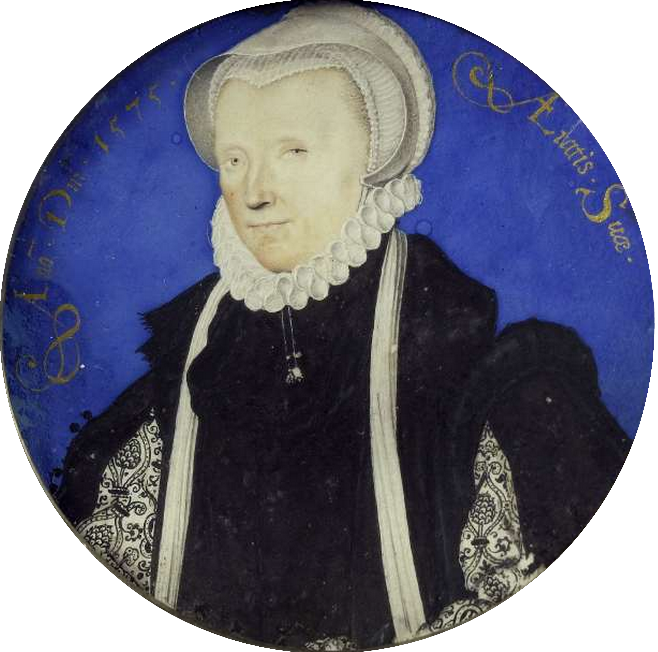
- Miniature of Lady Margaret Douglas by Nicholas Hilliard, 1575
- Born: 8 October 1515; Harbottle Castle, Northumberland, England
- Died: 7 March 1578 (aged 62); London, England
- Buried: Henry VII Lady Chapel, Westminster Abbey
- Spouse: Matthew Stewart, 4th Earl of Lennox (m. 1544; died 1571)
- Issue more...: Henry Stuart, Lord Darnley; Charles Stuart, 5th Earl of Lennox
- Parents: Archibald Douglas, 6th Earl of Angus; Margaret Tudor

Chart showing descent and progeny of Margaret Douglas, Countess of Lennox

Margaret Douglas, Countess of Lennox (8 October 1515 – 7 March 1578), born Lady Margaret Douglas, was the daughter of the Scottish queen dowager Margaret Tudor and her second husband Archibald Douglas, 6th Earl of Angus, and thus the granddaughter of King Henry VII of England and the half-sister of King James V. She was the grandmother of King James VI and I.

In her youth she was high in the favour of her uncle, Henry VIII, but later incurred his anger for her unauthorised engagement to Lord Thomas Howard, who died imprisoned in the Tower of London in 1537. In 1544, she married Scottish nobleman Matthew Stewart, 4th Earl of Lennox. Her son Henry Stuart, Lord Darnley, married her niece Mary, Queen of Scots, and was the father of James VI and I.

== Early life ==
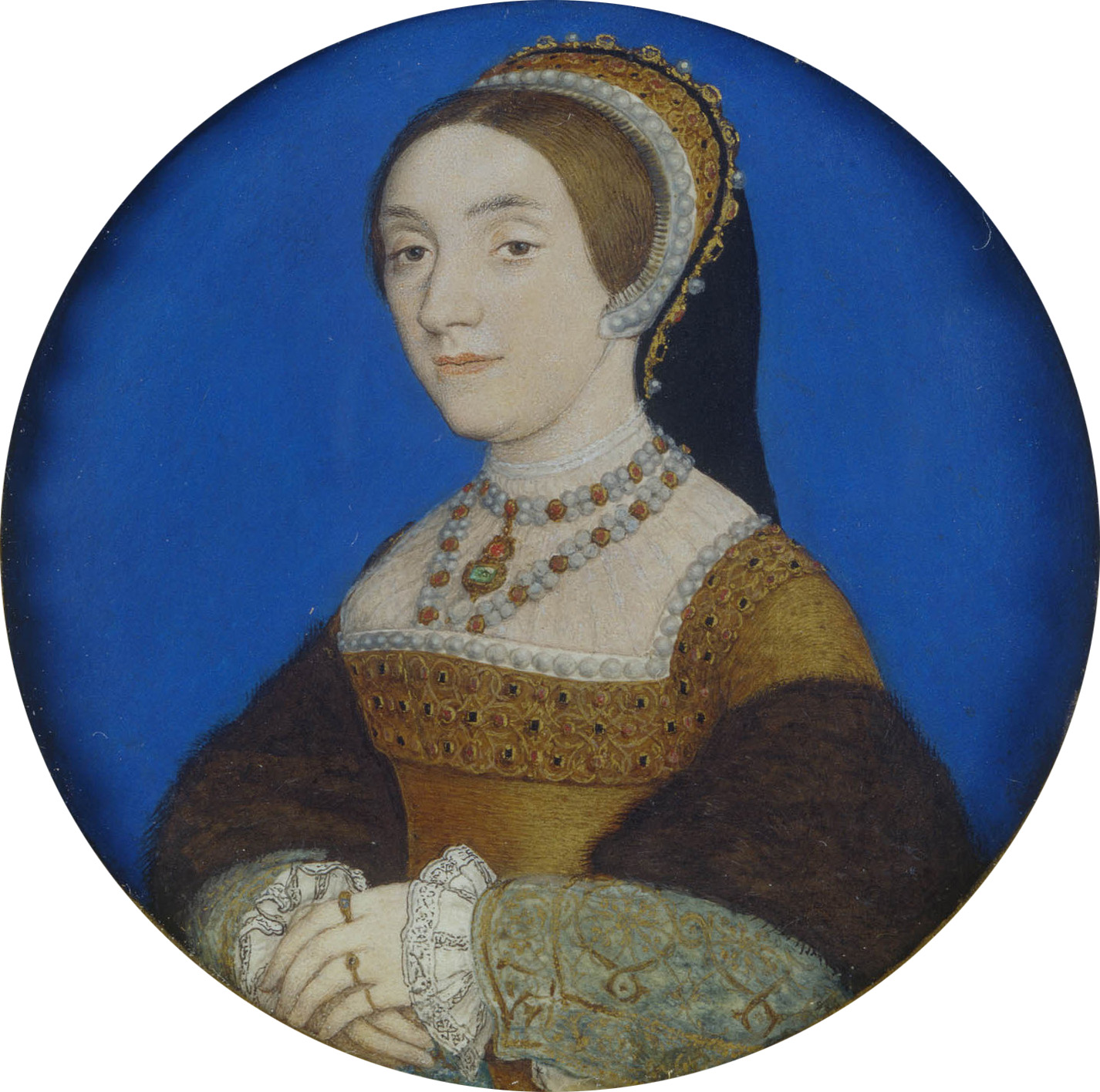
Although commonly believed to be Katherine Howard, it has been suggested that the woman in this portrait is Margaret Douglas

Margaret was born at Harbottle Castle in Northumberland on 8 October 1515. Her mother had crossed the border from Scotland when her father was facing difficulties in Scotland. In October 1528, Angus was threatened by James V of Scotland and sent Margaret back over the River Tweed into England at Norham Castle. After a brief stay at Berwick Castle accompanied by her nurse or 'gentlewoman' Isobel Hoppar, Margaret joined the household of her godfather, Cardinal Wolsey. When Wolsey died in 1530, Lady Margaret was invited to the royal Palace of Beaulieu, where she resided in the household of Princess Mary. Because of her nearness to the English crown, Lady Margaret Douglas was brought up chiefly at the English court in close association with Mary, her first cousin, the future Queen Mary I, who remained her lifelong friend; even when her father fled to England in May 1529 and remained there until 1542, Margaret never entered her father's custody, remaining in royal custody instead. Margaret gave Princess Mary gifts on New Year's Day, in 1543 her gift was a satin gown of carnation silk in Venice fashion. At Christmastime at Greenwich Palace in 1530, 1531, and 1532, Henry VIII gave Margaret the generous sum of 10 marks (£6-13s–4d).

When Anne Boleyn's court was established in October 1533, Margaret was brought to court from the Palace of Beaulieu and appointed as a lady-in-waiting. There she met Anne Boleyn's uncle, Lord Thomas Howard (not to be confused with his brother Thomas Howard, 3rd Duke of Norfolk), and they began their courtship. Thomas was a younger son of Thomas Howard, 2nd Duke of Norfolk, by his second marriage to Agnes Tilney. By the end of 1535 Thomas and Margaret had fallen in love and become secretly engaged. Technically, it was an act of treason, because Lord Howard had become engaged to a member of the Royal Family without Henry VIII's permission, which could cause problems for both him and Margaret if the King found out.

King Henry turned against Anne Boleyn in May 1536. When in early July 1536 he learned of Margaret's engagement to Thomas Howard (Anne's uncle), he became enraged. Because Henry had rewritten the Act of Succession, excluding his only legitimate daughters Mary and Elizabeth, and his illegitimate male son Henry FitzRoy, whom he tried to legitimize by making him Duke of Richmond and Somerset, was dying, Margaret suddenly became first in line to the throne, even overtaking her older half-brother, the King James V, which would make her Queen of England if Henry died without legitimate offspring; for the monarch, his niece's marriage, which he had not authorized, was politically scandalous, as it involved the brother of a powerful nobleman and a close relative of the disgraced Queen. Henry also wanted a marriage for his niece that would favor his personal interests, and the political interests of England. Both Howard and Margaret were imprisoned in the Tower of London. On 18 July 1536, Parliament, by an Act of Attainder, condemned Thomas to death for attempting to 'interrupt ympedyte and lett the seid Succession of the Crowne'. The Act also forbade the marriage of any member of the King's family without his permission. The death sentence was not carried out, and Lord Thomas languished in the Tower even though Margaret was required to renounce their relationship by King Henry's premier, Thomas Cromwell. Howard remained in the Tower, where he caught an illness and died on 31 October 1537.

Margaret, as a member of the Royal Family, was safe from execution. While in the Tower, she fell ill, and the King allowed her to be moved to Syon Abbey under the supervision of the abbess. There are many reports that her illness was because she was pregnant, and upon learning of it, the King ordered his niece to be confined in the Abbey. She was released from the Abbey on 29 October 1537. According to G. J. Meyer in his work The Tudors, King Henry VIII had interpreted the marriage between Lord Thomas Howard and Margaret Douglas to be an attempt by Lord Thomas to "make himself the king of England." However, the many love letters between Margaret Douglas and Lord Thomas reveal a true love affair wrongfully ended by the paranoia of King Henry VIII.

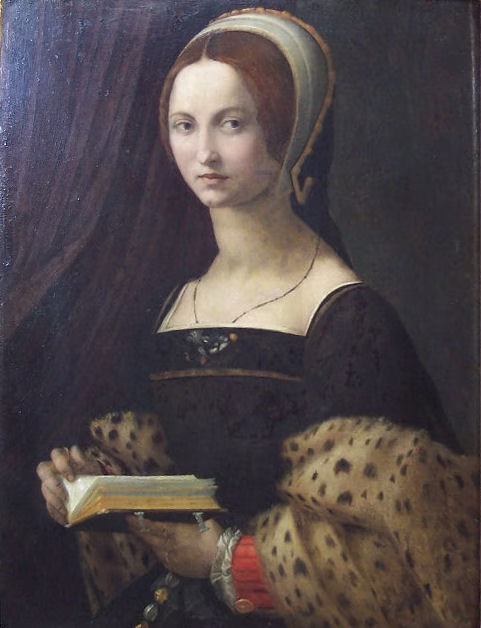
Initially thought to be Lady Jane Grey, it is now believed that this is a portrait of Margaret Douglas

Margaret was restored to favour and given a gilt cup made by the goldsmith Morgan Wolf as a New Year's Day gift for 1539. Princess Mary gave her a frontlet for a French hood as the result of a bet. Margaret and the Duchess of Richmond were appointed to greet Henry VIII's bride, Anne of Cleves, at Greenwich Palace, join her household, and convey her to the king. This would have been a great honour, but instead Henry chose to meet Anne at Rochester.

In 1540, Margaret was again in disgrace with the king when she had an affair with Lord Thomas Howard's half-nephew Sir Charles Howard. He was the son of Thomas' elder half-brother Lord Edmund Howard, and a brother of Henry VIII's fifth wife, Katherine Howard. Katherine Howard gave Margaret a gold "pair of beads", a rosary, as a New Year's Day gift.

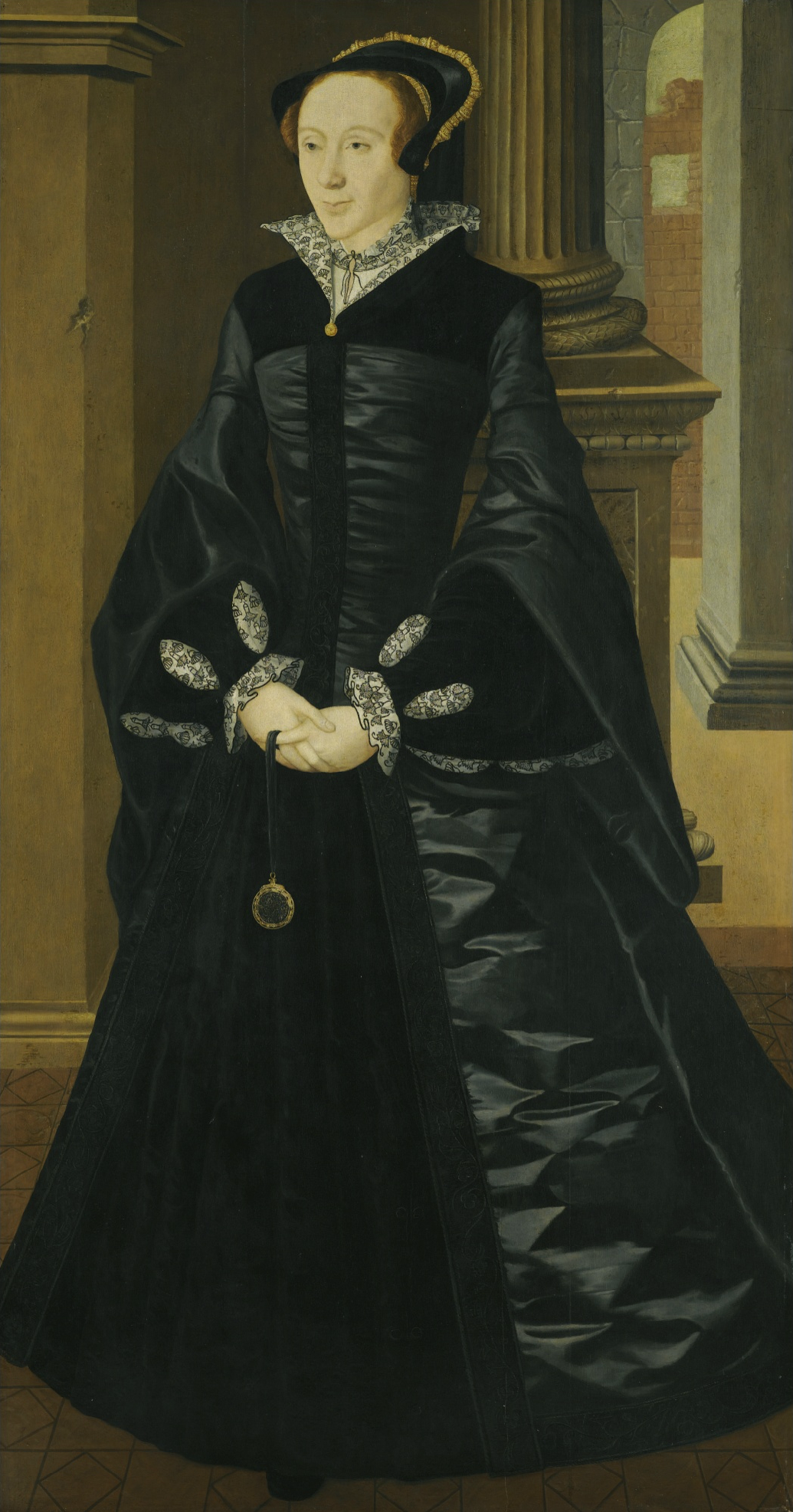
Possibly Margaret Douglas or Queen Mary Tudor

In 1543, Margaret was one of the few witnesses of King Henry's final marriage to Katherine Parr, Dowager Lady Latimer, at Hampton Court. Margaret became one of Queen Katherine's chief ladies. Katherine Parr and Margaret had known each other since they both had come to court in the 1520s.

== Marriage and diplomacy ==
Arms of Lady Margaret upon her marriage

On 6 July 1544, at St James's Palace, Lady Margaret married a Scottish exile, Matthew Stewart, 4th Earl of Lennox (1516–1571), who later became regent of Scotland in 1570–1571. They had eight or nine children, four boys: Henry, Henry, Philip and Charles, and four unnamed daughters. Only two sons survived to adulthood: Henry Stuart (1546–1567), born in 1546 at Temple Newsam, who later married his first cousin, Mary, Queen of Scots, and Charles Stuart (1555–1576), who later married Elizabeth Cavendish in 1574. One son was called Philip, presumably after the Spanish king and husband of Margaret's cousin, Mary I.

In June 1548, during the war of the Rough Wooing, Margaret's father, the Earl of Angus, wrote to her with the news that her uncle, George Douglas, and others of the family had been captured at Dalkeith Palace. Her father hoped that she and her husband could arrange that they were well treated as prisoners. The Earl of Lennox forwarded the letter to the Duke of Somerset, writing that his father-in-law would have done better to ask others for help. Margaret wrote to her father from Wressle Castle in March 1549, complaining that he had avoided meeting her husband. She asked him to seek an honourable peace through the acknowledgement of her marriage, "what a memorial it should be to you!" In 1551, Mary of Guise, the mother of Mary, Queen of Scots, visited London, and Margaret came south from Temple Newsam to visit her at Edward VI's court.

During the reign of Queen Mary I of England, Lady Margaret had rooms in Westminster Palace. In November 1553, the queen told the ambassador, Simon Renard, that Margaret was best suited to succeed her to the throne.

Mary, at that time, concerned about her half-sister's religious convictions (Elizabeth only attended mass out of obligation and had superficially converted to Catholicism to save her life after being imprisoned on suspicion of participating in the Wyatt's Rebellion, although deep down she remained Protestant), seriously considered removing Elizabeth from the succession and naming Margaret as heir. However, in order for her cousin to become the new heir to the throne, Mary had to ask Parliament to remove or change the terms of the Act of Succession of 1544, which stipulated that Elizabeth was next in line of succession after her sister, and that after her, the next in line of succession were the Greys, descendants of Mary and Margaret's aunt, Mary Tudor, Widowed Queen of France and Duchess of Suffolk. Mary encountered resistance from Parliament. Members of Parliament, even those who were Catholics, were too reluctant to alter the succession. Furthermore, Elizabeth was highly favored among those members who were unhappy with the joint rule of Mary and Philip II of Spain.

Margaret was the chief mourner at Queen Mary's funeral in December 1558. On the accession of Queen Elizabeth I of England, Margaret moved to Yorkshire, where her home at Temple Newsam became a centre for Roman Catholic intrigue.

Margaret succeeded in marrying her elder son, Lord Darnley, to his first cousin, Mary, Queen of Scots, thus uniting their claims to the English throne. Queen Elizabeth I disapproved of the marriage plans and had Lady Margaret sent to the Tower of London in June 1565. During her time in the Tower, a servant carved an inscription or graffiti in her lodging including the names of her attendants Elisabeth Hussey, Jean Baily, Elisabeth Chambrelan, Robert Portington, and Edward Cheyne.

After Darnley's murder in 1567, Margaret was released. Margaret wrote to Mary demanding justice and revenge for her son's death. She denounced her daughter-in-law, but was eventually later reconciled with Mary. Her husband assumed the government of Scotland as regent, but was assassinated in 1571.

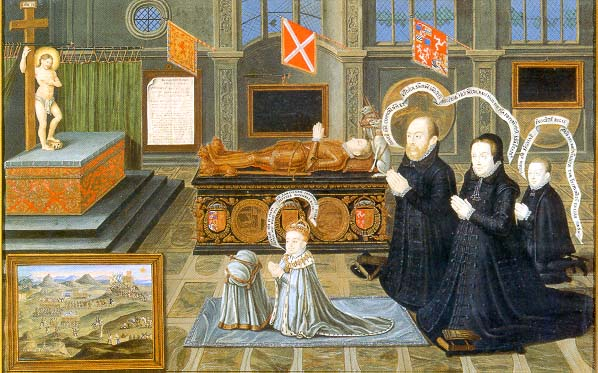
Margaret, her husband, Matthew Stewart, 4th Earl of Lennox, his youngest son Charles, the future 5th Earl of Lennox and his grandson, King James VI praying and crying before an image of Christ on the Cross for the murder of his son Henry, Lord Darnley

On 3 August, the governor of Scotland, Regent Morton wrote to her about the capture of Edinburgh Castle from the supporters of Mary, Queen of Scots. An English commander at the siege, William Drury, had obtained some of the jewels of Mary, Queen of Scots. Morton thought that Margaret was best placed to ask and influence Drury to send the jewels back to him in Scotland.

In October 1574, Margaret left court and travelled to her house in the north. The French ambassador, Mothe-Fénelon, heard that she intended visit her grandson James VI at Stirling. Instead, she again aroused Queen Elizabeth's anger by marrying her younger son Charles to Elizabeth Cavendish, the stepdaughter of the Earl of Shrewsbury. She was again sent to the Tower, unlike the Countess of Shrewsbury, but was pardoned after her son Charles' death in 1576.

Lady Margaret's diplomacy largely contributed to the future succession of her grandson, James VI of Scotland, to the English throne.

== Death and legacy ==
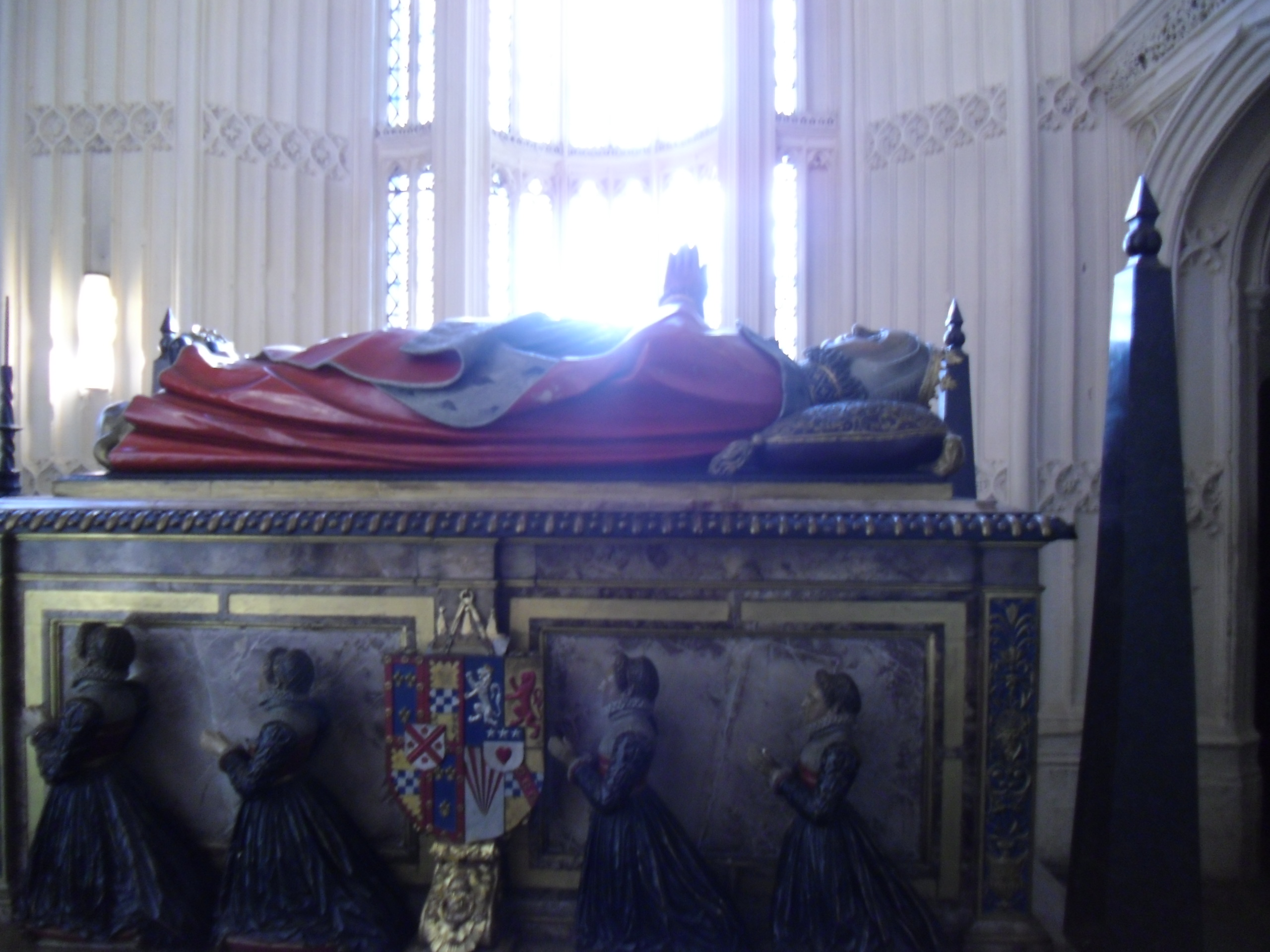
Tomb of Margaret Douglas in Westminster Abbey; this side shows her four daughters

After the death of her younger son, she helped care for his daughter, Lady Arbella. However, she did not outlive him by very long, and died at Hackney in March 1578. A few days before her death, she dined with Robert Dudley, Earl of Leicester, and this led to rumours that she had been poisoned, which were included in the book Leicester's Commonwealth. There is no historical evidence to substantiate this.

Although she died in debt, she was given a grand funeral in Westminster Abbey, at the expense of Queen Elizabeth I, with a hundred poor women in attendance. She was buried in the same grave as her son Charles in the south aisle of Henry VII's chapel in the Abbey. It has been said that her grandson erected the fine monument, but it was commissioned in October 1578 by her executor and former servant Thomas Fowler. Her recumbent effigy, made of alabaster, wears a French cap and ruff with a red fur-lined cloak, over a dress of blue and gold. On either side of the tomb chest are weepers of her four sons and four daughters.

Robert Dudley, 1st Earl of Leicester, had eight tapestries at Kenilworth Castle in 1588 which had been bought from "Lady Lennox". The subjects included Josias, Demophon and Achilles, and the History of Noah. At his death in 1624, Ludovic Stewart, 2nd Duke of Lennox, had a bed in his lodgings at the gatehouse of Whitehall Palace that had belonged to Margaret Douglas, and she had "worked" or embroidered the curtains.

The Lennox Jewel was most likely made for Lady Lennox in the 1570s although the date and occasion of its commission is the subject of some controversy. In 1842, the jewel was bought by her descendant, Queen Victoria. The locket, considered "one of the most important early jewels in the Royal Collection", is on display in the Holyrood Palace.

== Poetry ==
Margaret Douglas is known for her poetry. Many of her works are written to her lover, Lord Thomas Howard, and are preserved in the Devonshire MS. Her close friends, Mary Shelton and the Duchess of Richmond, were the main contributors, as well as Henry Howard, Earl of Surrey, and Thomas Wyatt.
