= Elizabeth Cavendish, Countess of Lennox =

English noblewoman

Elizabeth Cavendish
- Countess of Lennox
- Born: 31 March 1555; Chatsworth House, Derbyshire, England
- Died: 16 January 1582 (aged 26)
- Spouse: Charles Stuart, 1st Earl of Lennox
- Issue: Arbella Stuart
- Father: Sir William Cavendish
- Mother: Bess of Hardwick

Elizabeth Stuart, Countess of Lennox née Cavendish (31 March 1555 – 16 January 1582) was an English noblewoman and the wife of Charles Stuart, 1st Earl of Lennox. She was the mother of Arbella Stuart, a close relation to the English and Scottish thrones.

== Family ==
Elizabeth Cavendish was born in Chatsworth House, Derbyshire, on 31 March 1555, the daughter of Bess of Hardwick and her second husband Sir William Cavendish. Catherine Grey was one of her godmothers. Bess was a Lady of the Bedchamber to Queen Elizabeth I and became one of the wealthiest women in England. Elizabeth Cavendish had seven siblings, two of whom died in early infancy.

== Marriage to the Earl of Lennox ==
In 1574, Elizabeth Cavendish secretly married Charles Stuart, 1st Earl of Lennox, the younger brother of Henry Stuart, Lord Darnley and a claimant to the English throne, at Rufford Abbey in Nottinghamshire. Queen Elizabeth I became enraged at the two mothers for arranging such a controversial marriage without her permission. The Queen sent Elizabeth's mother-in-law, Margaret Douglas, to imprisonment in the Tower of London. Bess of Hardwick and Elizabeth, Countess of Lennox, were ordered to remain at Rufford.

Mary, Queen of Scots, sent her a gift in November 1575, and Elizabeth thanked her for the "token" in a postscript added to her mother's letter written at Hackney.

On 10 November 1575, Elizabeth gave birth to her only child, Arbella Stuart. Her husband died in 1576 of tuberculosis.

Elizabeth herself died six years later on 16 January 1582 at age 26. The Earl of Shrewsbury wrote to William Cecil that his wife, Bess of Hardwick, "takes my daughter Lennox's death so greivously that she neither does nor can think of anything but of lamenting and weeping."
