= Zibellino =

Women's fashion accessory

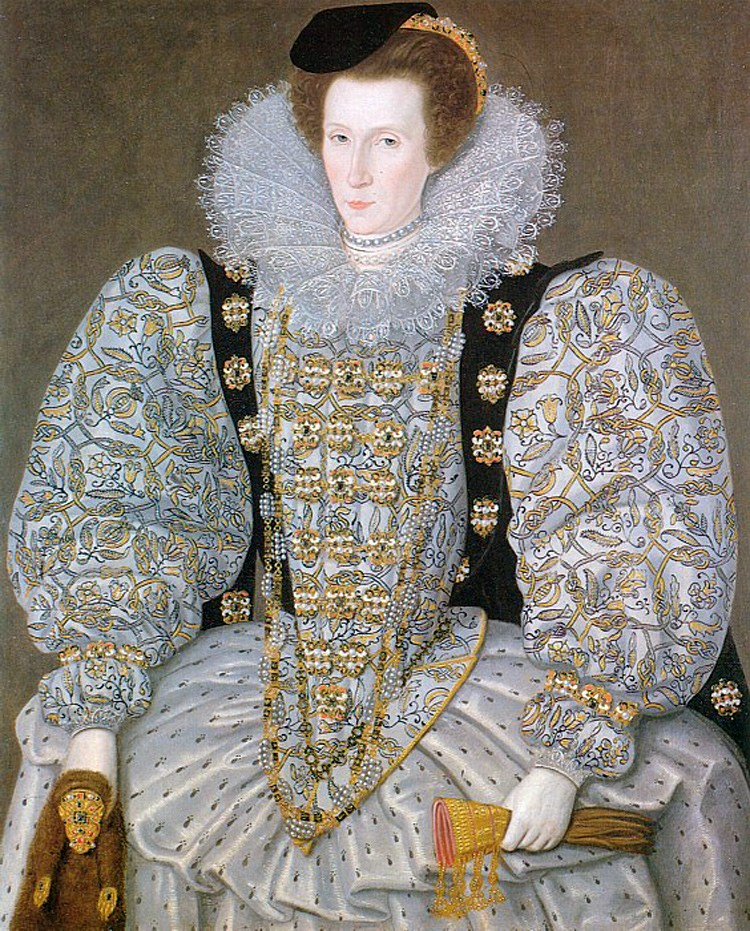
Portrait attributed to William Segar, c. 1595, showing a lady holding a zibellino

A zibellino, flea-fur or fur tippet is a women's fashion accessory popular in the later 15th and 16th centuries. A zibellino, from the Italian word for "sable", is the pelt of a sable or marten worn draped at the neck or hanging at the waist, or carried in the hand. The plural is zibellini. Some zibellini were fitted with faces and paws of goldsmith's work with jeweled eyes and pearl earrings, while unadorned furs were also fashionable.

== History ==
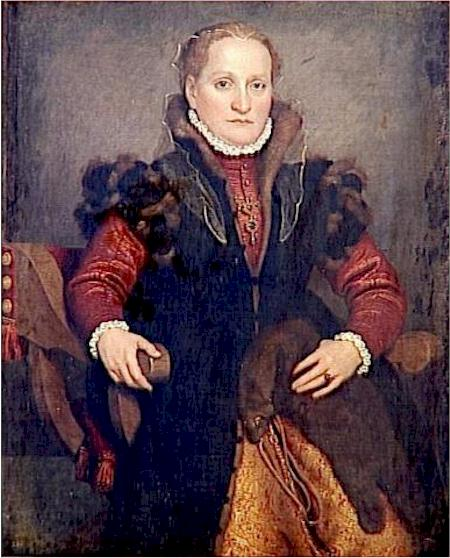
Angelica Agliardi De Nicolinis holding an unadorned zibellino, c. 1560s

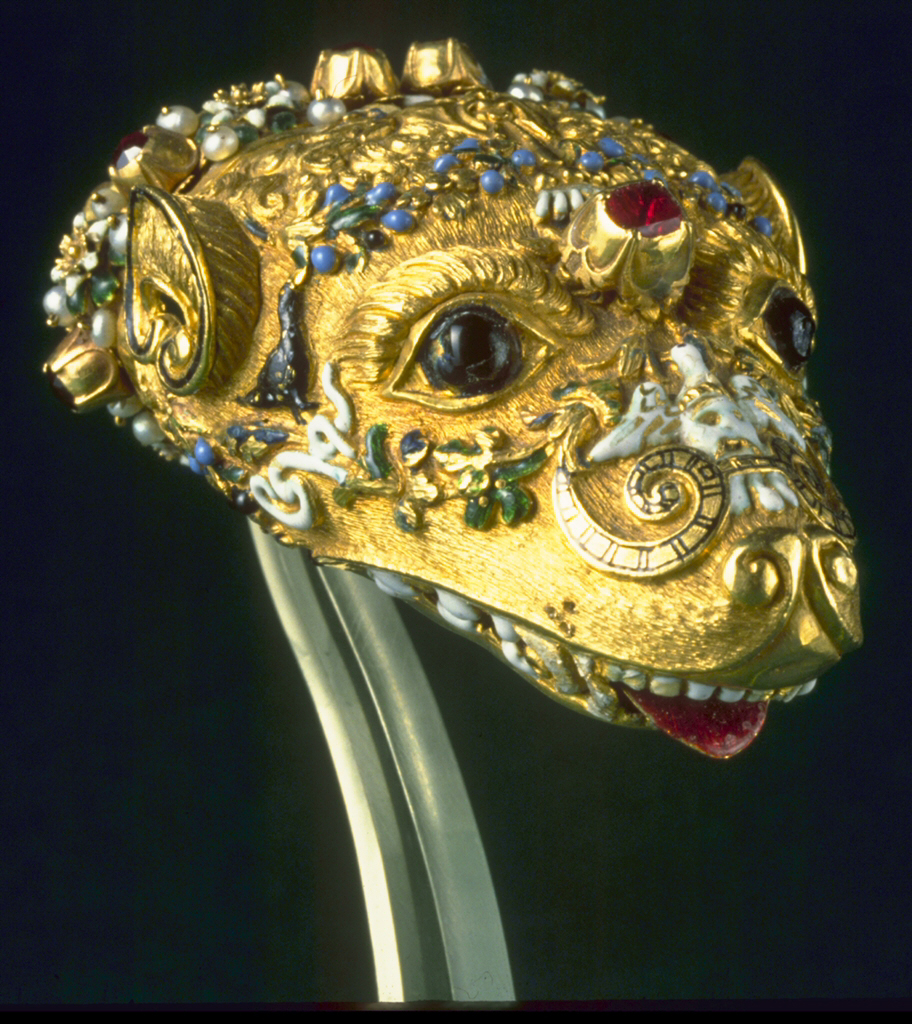
Jewelled head for a zibellino, Italy, ca. 1550–59 (Walters Art Museum)

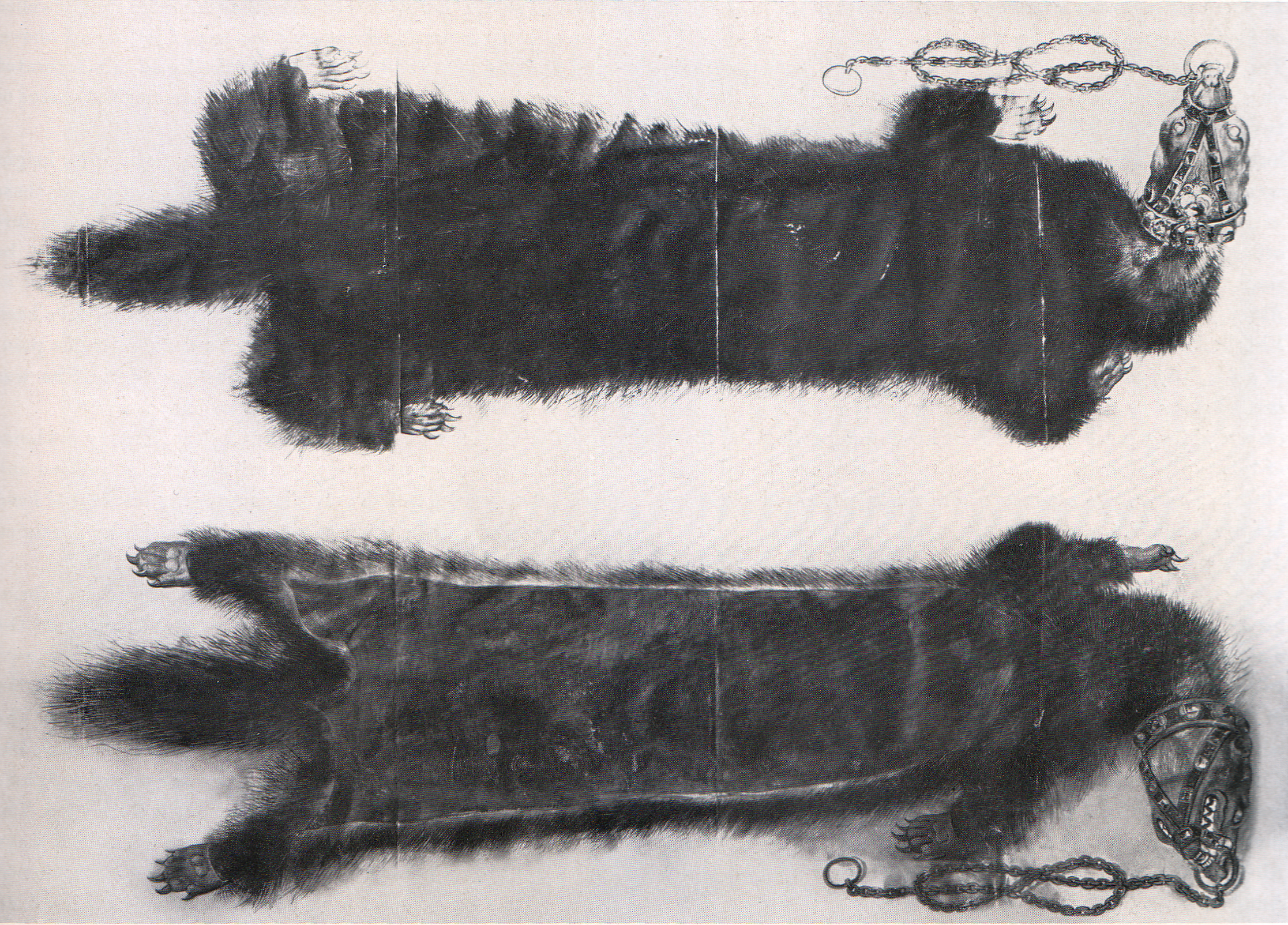
Zibellino belonging to Anna of Austria drawn by Hans Muelich

The earliest surviving mention of a marten pelt to be worn as neck ornament occurs in an inventory of Charles the Bold, Duke of Burgundy, dated 1467, but the fashion was widespread in Northern Italy by the 1490s. Eleonora de Toledo owned at least four; the weasel was an early modern talisman for fertility and Eleonora was applauded as La Fecondissima ("most fertile") for the number of her children. Eleonora's daughter Isabella de' Medici appears with a zibellino in a portrait by a member of Bronzino's studio painted at the time of her marriage in 1558 to Paolo Giordano Orsini.

The style spread to the north and west. The traditional costume historian's term for this accessory, flea-fur, is from the German Flohpelz, coined by Wendelin Boeheim in 1894, who was the first to suggest that the furs were intended to attract fleas away from the body of the wearer. There is no historical evidence to support this claim. Italians simply called these accessories "zibellini", their word for sables and speakers of other languages called them "martens", "sables" or "ermines" in their native tongues.

The fashion for carrying zibellini died out in the first years of the 17th century, although fox, mink and other pelts were worn in similar fashion in the 19th and 20th century.

== England and Scotland ==
The jewelled gold heads and feet of zibellini were detailed in several royal inventories. The Edinburgh goldsmith John Mosman made a marten's head and feet from Scottish gold for Mary of Guise in December 1539. Her daughter, Mary, Queen of Scots, brought fur pieces on her return to Scotland from France in 1561; one of her zibellini had a head of jet, and one of rock crystal. Mary had zibellini of marten, sable, and ermine fur. In 1580, Mary, Queen of Scots, wrote to France for a marten fur and a gold marten's head set with precious stones for a christening gift for Gilbert Talbot's daughter Mary.

In England, when Lady Jane Grey was at the Tower of London in 1553, she had a "sable skin, with a head of gold, muffled, garnished and set with four emeralds, four turquoises, six rubies, two diamonds and five pearls; four feet of gold, each set with a turquoise, the tongue being a ruby". Another sable skin used by Jane Grey had a clock or watch attached. Both sable skins had belonged to the wives of Henry VIII. Anne Herbert, Countess of Pembroke, sister of Catherine Parr, owned a "sabelles heade" set with 21 diamonds and a ruby in its mouth. Elizabeth I of England received a "Sable Skynne the hed and fourre featte of gold fully furnished with Dyamondes and Rubyes" as a New Year's Gift from the Earl of Leicester in 1585.

Frances Sidney, Countess of Sussex holds a jewelled gold marten's head and fur in her 1570s portrait at Sidney Sussex College, Cambridge. In 1578 Margaret Douglas, Countess of Lennox bequeathed a sable with a gold head set with diamonds to Arbella Stuart. In 1606, Anne of Denmark owned "a sable head of gold with a collar or muzzle enamelled, garnished with diamonds, rubies, emeralds, and sapphires, with four feet, in each foot a small stone, and a ring in the mouth with a pearl", possibly inherited from Elizabeth or Mary, Queen of Scots.

Bess of Hardwick sent an ermine to the Countess of Shrewsbury in July 1607, which had been a gift to her. The Countess described the zibellino as lifelike in her thank-you letter: 'with humble thanks for your Ladyship's "fayre and wellwrought Armen", which Godwilling I will keep as a great jewel both in respect of your Ladyship and her from whom your Ladyship had it, There can be nothing wrought in metal with more life'.

== Gallery ==
Italy, 1515

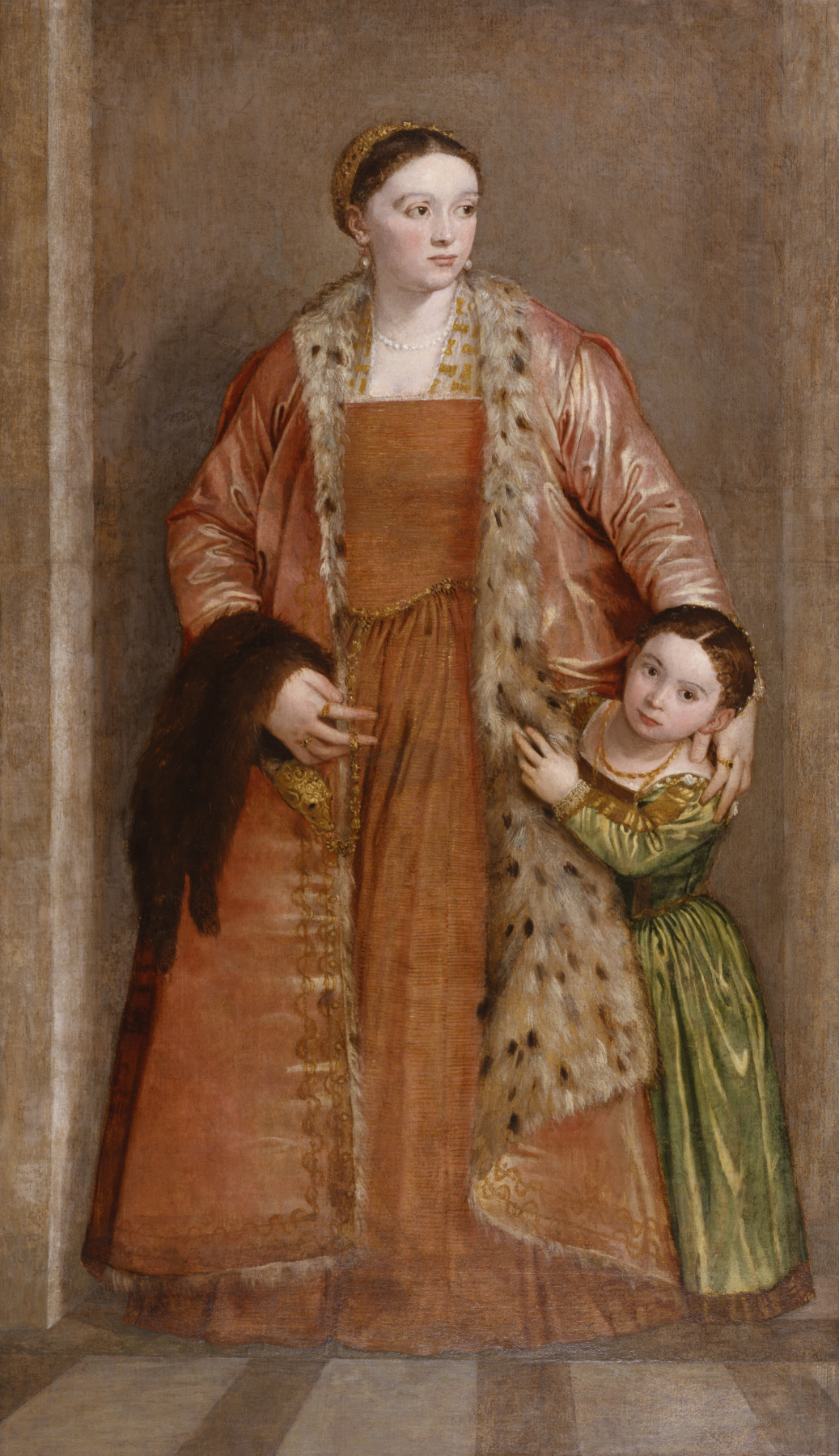
Italy, 1552.

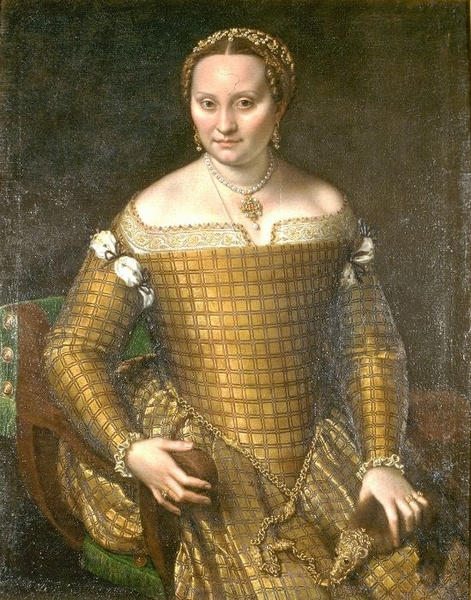
Italy 1557

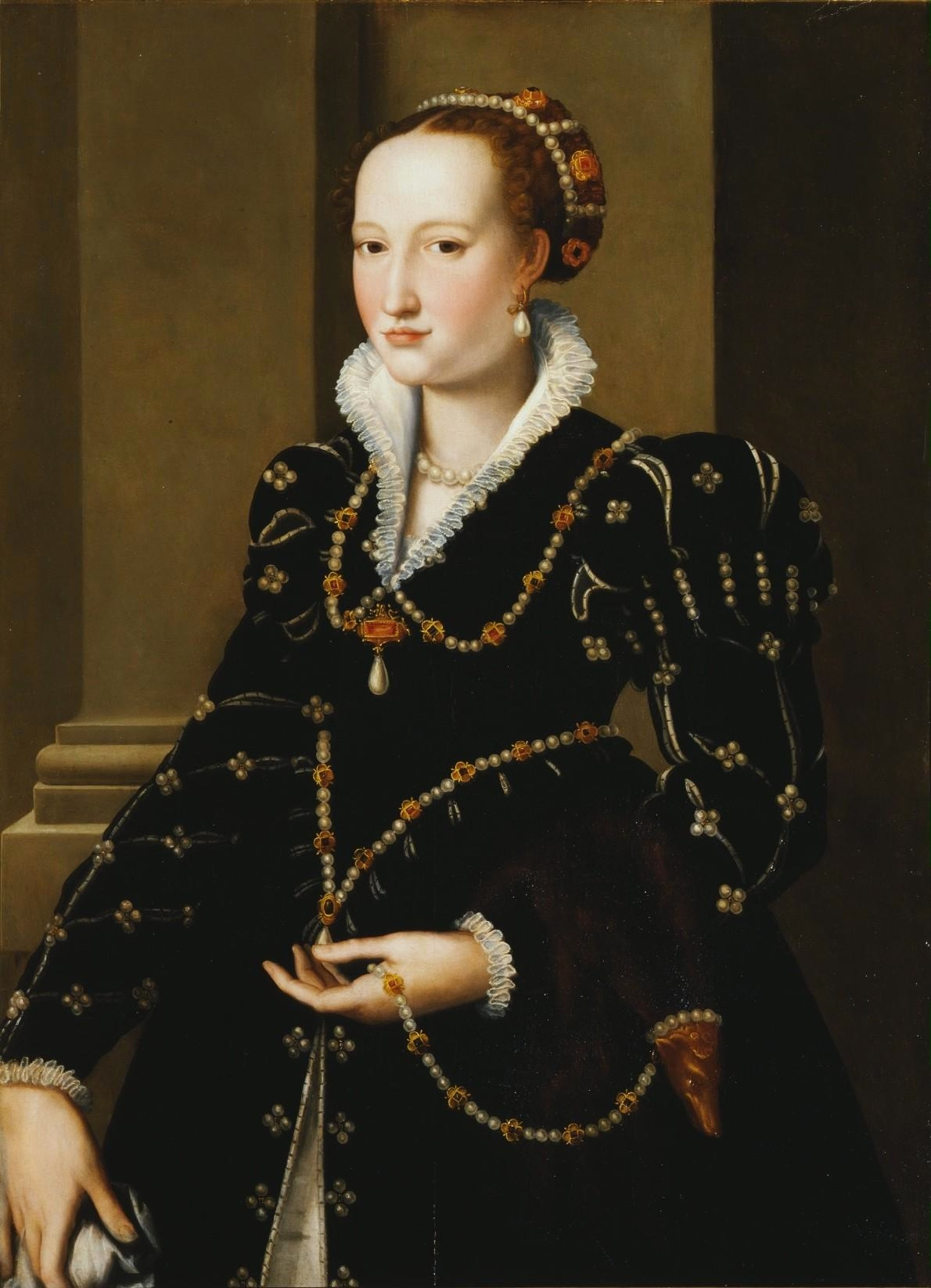
Isabella de' Medici, Italy, 1558

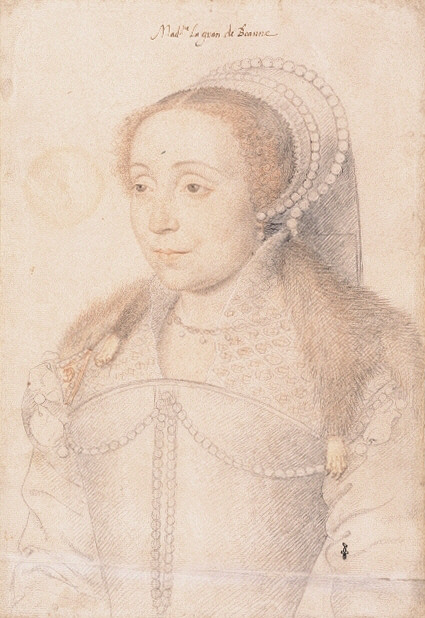
France, mid-16th century

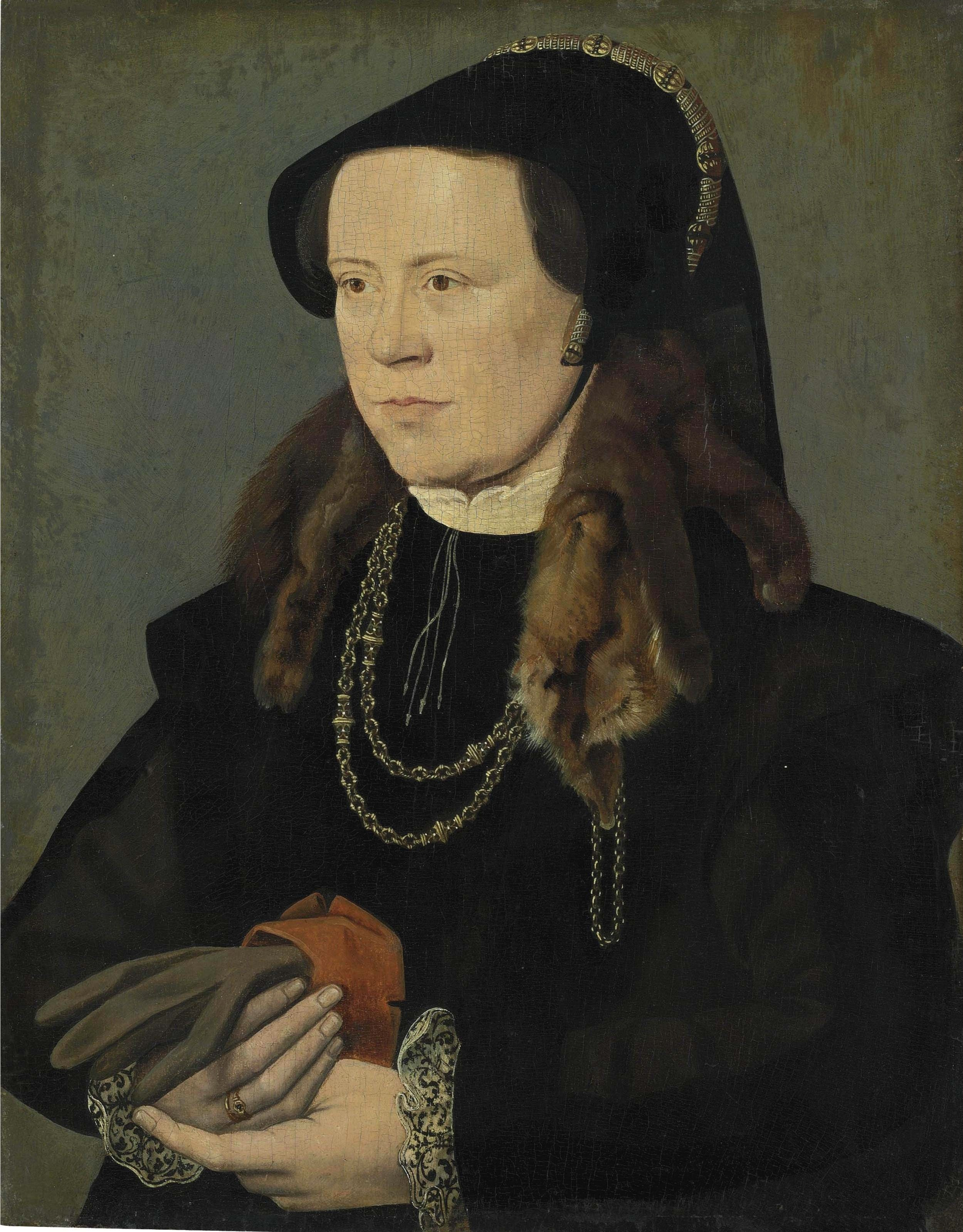
probably England, mid-16th century

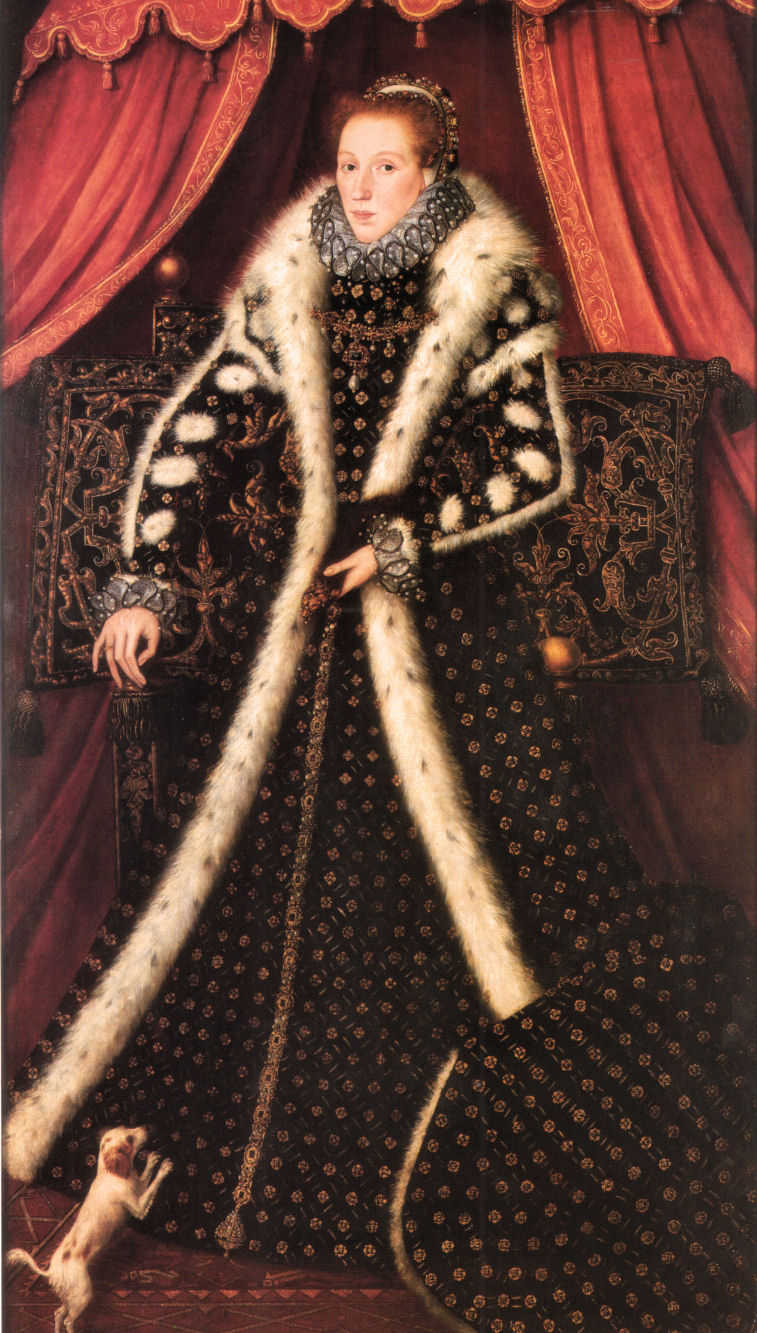
Frances Sidney, Countess of Sussex, England, ca. 1570-75

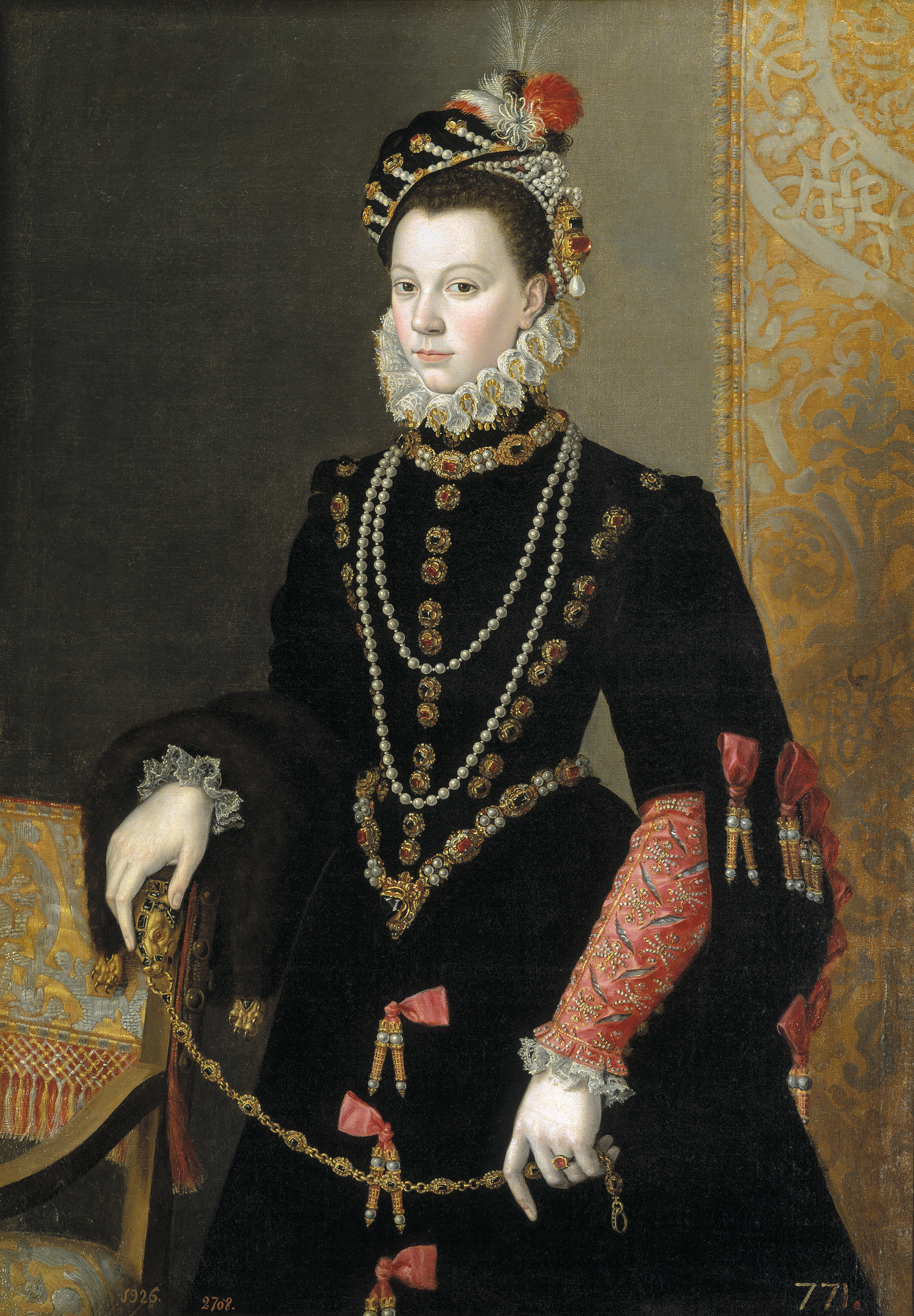
Elisabeth of Valois, Spain, 1560s

== See also ==
- Tippet
