= Mary Talbot, Countess of Shrewsbury =

English noblewoman (1556–1632)

Mary Talbot
- Countess of Shrewsbury
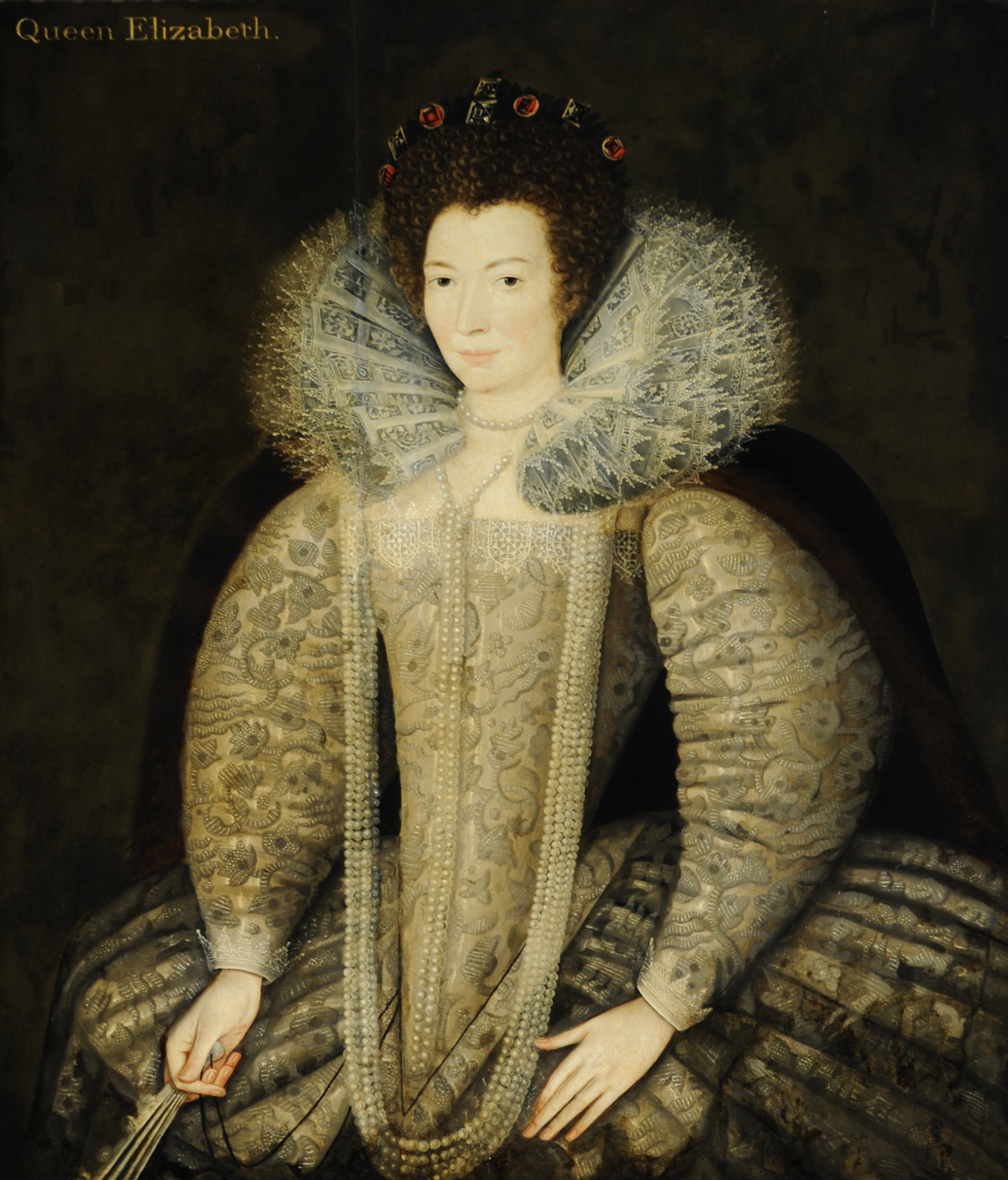
- Born: Mary Cavendish; 1556
- Died: 1632 (aged 75–76)
- Noble family: Cavendish
- Spouse: Gilbert Talbot, 7th Earl of Shrewsbury
- Issue: George Talbot; Mary Talbot, Countess of Pembroke; Elizabeth Talbot, Countess of Kent; John Talbot; Althea Talbot, Countess of Arundel
- Father: William Cavendish
- Mother: Bess of Hardwick

Mary Talbot, Countess of Shrewsbury (1556–1632) (née Cavendish) was the wife of Gilbert Talbot, 7th Earl of Shrewsbury.

== Life ==
=== Family ===
Born Mary Cavendish, she was the daughter of Sir William Cavendish, who died when she was about a year old, and his wife Bess of Hardwick. Mary inherited her mother's strong will and colourful character.

Bess of Hardwick remarried to Sir William St. Loe, who left his wife everything when he died in 1564/5, making her one of the most eligible women in England; a number of important men began to court her, including George Talbot, 6th Earl of Shrewsbury.

Lady St. Loe consented to give her hand and heart to the 6th Earl of Shrewsbury in consideration of his settling a large jointure on her, and marrying his second son, Gilbert Talbot, to her daughter, Mary Cavendish, and his daughter Grace to her son Henry Cavendish. These preliminary alliances were duly effected in 1568, one of the brides, Mary, being then not quite twelve years old. The parents were married soon after.

=== Marriage ===
Mary married her stepbrother Gilbert Talbot, later the 7th Earl of Shrewsbury, in 1568.

Their children were:

- George, 1575–1577
- Mary, later Countess of Pembroke
- Elizabeth, later Countess of Kent
- John, born and died 1583
- Alethea, later Countess of Arundel

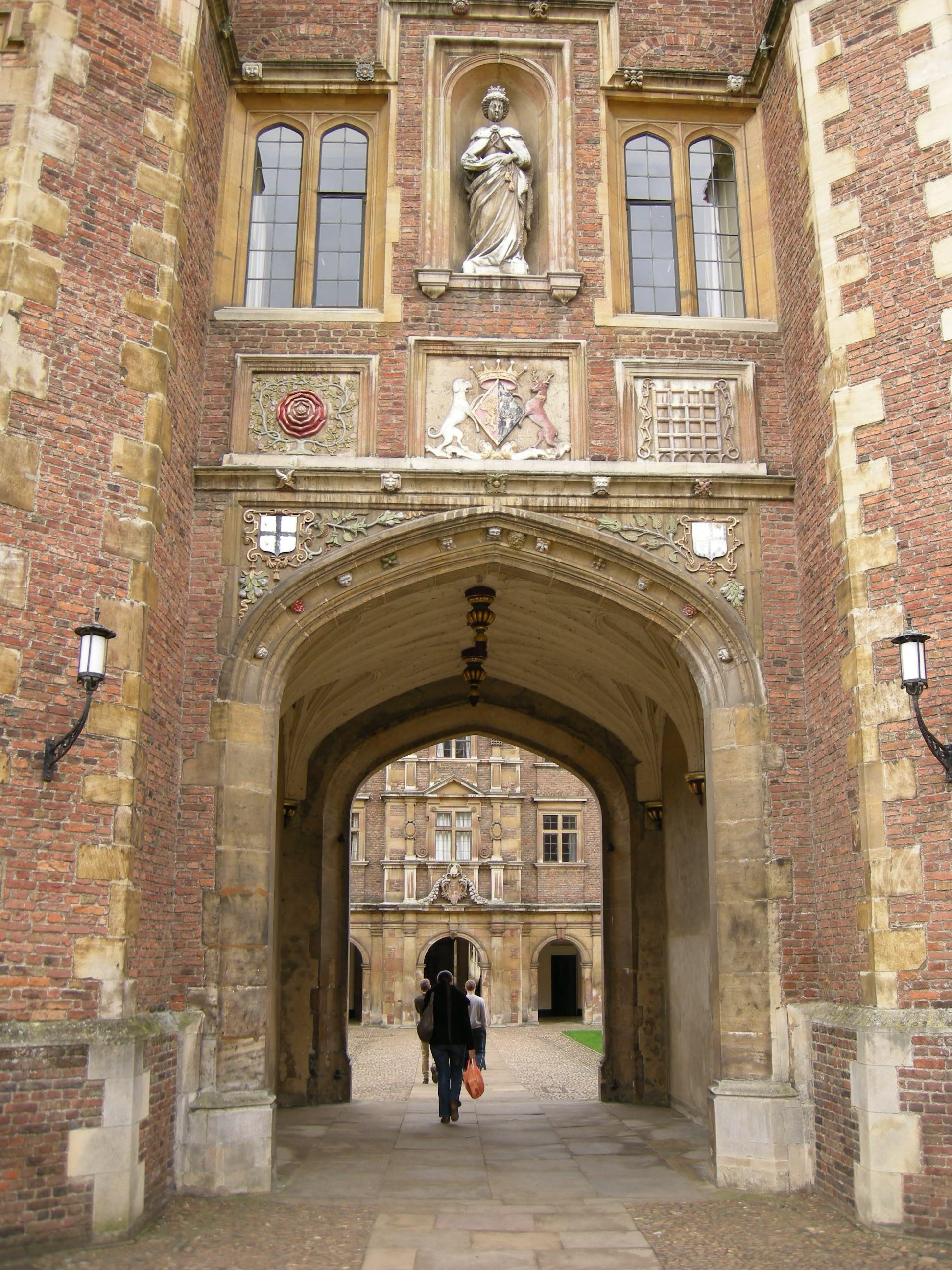
Statue of Mary Cavendish on gatehouse to Second Court of St John's College, Cambridge, which she financed, with arms of Talbot impaling Cavendish below

In May 1573 Gilbert Talbot hired a "sober maiden" Margaret Butler who had been a servant of Nazareth Newton, Lady Southwell for his wife.

In December 1607 the Earl and Countess of Shrewsbury and her brother Charles Cavendish went to Hardwick Hall for a day to see her mother, Bess of Hardwick. Shrewsbury wrote he "found a lady of great years, or great wealth, and of a great wit, which yet still remains".

=== Gift giving ===
In December 1603, Arbella Stuart discussed with Mary the issue of buying New Year's Day gifts for Anne of Denmark. Stuart recommended asking one of queen's chamberers, Margaret Hartsyde, because she was discreet, and would let her "understand the Queenes minde with out knowing who asked it". From time to time, Mary and the Earl of Shrewsbury sent Arbella (when she was at court) gifts of hartshorn (used as a medicine) and red deer venison pies.

Bess of Hardwick gave Mary a zibellino, an ermine fur with gilt attachments, in July 1607. Mary described the ermine as lifelike in her thank-you letter: 'with humble thanks for your Ladyship's "fayre and wellwrought Armen", which Godwilling I will keep as a great jewel both in respect of your Ladyship and her from whom your Ladyship had it, There can be nothing wrought in metal with more life'. Mary sent Bess a cushion, embroidered following the pattern of Lady Arundel's bed hangings.

=== Houses ===
Charles Cavendish drew plans for a new house for the couple in May 1607 and wrote to both of them about the design. He told his sister Mary that the great chamber and principal lodgings would all be on the first floor or "first height". There were lodgings for the king and queen. He put the kitchen and hall where noise and smell would not trouble the staterooms.

=== Imprisonment ===
Although her family was Anglican Protestant, Mary converted to Catholicism as an adult. This may have been one of the reasons why she gave financial assistance to her niece Arbella Stuart, who was also first cousin to the King, in 1610, with the knowledge that the latter was planning to elope to the Continent with her cousin William Seymour. This marriage was certain to enrage King James I of England, since William, like Arbella, had a respectable claim to the throne (by some reckonings she was fourth in line to the throne and he was sixth in line). Arbella and Seymour tried to escape to France in 1611. For this, Mary was imprisoned in the Tower of London. It was said that Arbella remained calm when they were questioned, but Mary cried out, "All is but tricks and giggs".

She was tried for her role in the elopement, and was heavily fined, but not released. Later, Arbella accused Mary of being involved in a Catholic plot. One of Arbella's biographers remarks that Mary's motives in aiding Arbella are very difficult to understand: even allowing that Mary was a Catholic, and fond of her niece, she was certainly intelligent enough to understand the dire consequences for herself. Perhaps she relied on her husband's influence to save her from the Tower. Like her mother, she was one of the few women of the time who was used to getting her own way.

Mary was deeply distressed by Arbella's death in 1615, especially since she had been assured that Arbella was on the road to recovery, and remarked that she could think of nothing else. The court physician Théodore de Mayerne treated her for a spell of melancholy in which she imagined she had been poisoned.

In 1615, Mary was released from the Tower, partly in recognition of her role in detecting the murder of Sir Thomas Overbury, and partly because her husband was very ill. In 1618, she was called to give evidence in the course of an inquiry into the rumours that Arbella had secretly given birth to a child. Mary refused to testify, saying she had sworn a binding oath not to, and was returned to the Tower, where she remained until 1623, occupying the best lodgings. Mary was not easily intimidated: Dorothy L. Sayers in her novel Gaudy Night described her as "uncontrollable by her menfolk, undaunted by the Tower, and contemptuously silent before the Privy Council". Francis Bacon remarked that while Lord Shrewsbury was a "great person", there was "a greater than he, which is my Lady of Shrewsbury".

== In fiction ==
There is a brief sketch of her character in the mystery novel Gaudy Night by Dorothy L. Sayers, which is set in Shrewsbury College, a fictional Oxford college named in her honour. The heroine Harriet Vane studies Lady Shrewsbury's portrait and wonders why the college had chosen "so ominous a patroness … a great intellectual certainly, but something of a holy terror".
