= Elizabeth Talbot =

Elizabeth Talbot may refer to:

- Elizabeth Grey, Countess of Kent, born Elizabeth Talbot (1582–1651)
- Elizabeth Talbot, Duchess of Norfolk (c. 1443 – c. 1506)
- Elizabeth Talbot, Baroness Lisle (died 1487), daughter of John Talbot, 1st Viscount Lisle
- Elizabeth Talbot, Countess of Shrewsbury, known as Bess of Hardwick (c. 1521–1608)
- Elizabeth Ross Talbot Banner, a.k.a. Betty Talbot, a fictional character from Marvel Comics, wife of Bruce Banner, alter ego of Hulk
- Liz Yelling (born 1974), British long-distance runner born Elizabeth Talbot
