= Oldcotes Manor =

Oldcotes House was a mansion in Derbyshire built by Bess of Hardwick. The building has been completely demolished.

The manor at Sutton Scarsdale was earlier called "Caldecotes" and "Oldcotes". Bess of Hardwick bought the manor from the Savage family in 1593 and called it "Oldcotes" in her time, the modern spelling of the site is "Owlcotes". There was already a house on the site and Bess of Hardwick built a new house close by.

Bess of Hardwick built the new house at Oldcotes after completing the nearby Old Hall at Hardwick and while building Hardwick Hall. It was intended for her son William Cavendish, who kept accounts for the work. The walls and chimneys were built by a team of six "wallers" who also worked at Hardwick. The house was probably designed by Robert Smythson. Details in the building contract, and an image drawn on a 1659 estate plan, are compatible with a drawing by Smythson in the RIBA collection. In September 1599 William Cavendish paid for a table for the Low Great Chamber, indicating that the work was nearing completion. His wife, Anne Keighley, died in February 1598, before Oldcotes was completed.

Bess was pleased with her building and furnishing at Chatsworth, Hardwick, and Oldcotes, and indicated in her will that furnishings should stay in these houses in situ for the benefit of her descendants. An inventory was included, referring mostly to items at Hardwick.

Arbella Stuart stayed at Oldcotes in February 1603. She had told Bess that she would not eat and drink at Hardwick until she had a letter from Elizabeth I, so Bess sent her to her other house. Francis Leek wrote that Lady Cavendish was staying at Olcotes and unwell in July 1605 after an argument with Bess of Hardwick.

In 1641, William Cavendish, 3rd Earl of Devonshire and Christian Bruce, Countess of Devonshire, sold Oldcotes (old and new) and the lands to Robert Pierrepont, 1st Earl of Kingston. An inventory was made of furnishings belonging to George Pierrepont of Oldcotes in 1666. There were 40 stools with leather seats in the Long gallery where Pierrepont played billiards.

Bess of Hardwick's Oldcotes was demolished in the early 17th-century. Some of the stonework was probably incorporated into two new smaller dwellings, and some rubble was used for roadbuilding.
