= Mary Herbert, Countess of Pembroke =

Mary Herbert, Countess of Pembroke may refer to:

- Mary Herbert (writer), (1561–1621), Countess of Pembroke, one of the first English women to achieve a major reputation for her literary works
- Mary Herbert, Countess of Pembroke (d. 1649), (c. 1594–1649), wife of William Herbert, 3rd Earl of Pembroke, daughter-in-law of the above
