= William Cavendish, 1st Earl of Devonshire =

English nobleman

The Right Honourable The Earl of Devonshire
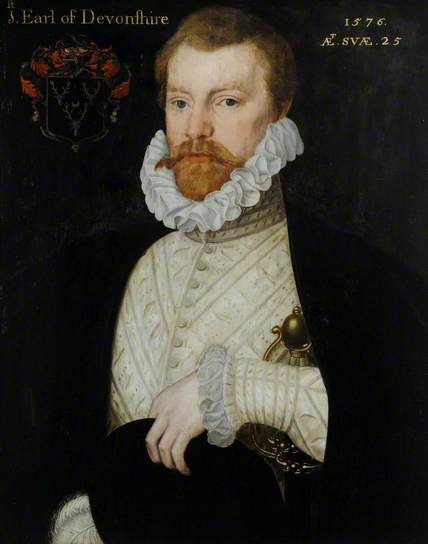
- William Cavendish, 1st Earl of Devonshire
- Born: 27 December 1552
- Died: 3 March 1626 (aged 73); Hardwick, Derbyshire, England
- Spouse(s): Anne Keighley, Elizabeth Boughton
- Children: William Cavendish, 2nd Earl of Devonshire; Frances Cavendish; Gilbert Cavendish; James Cavendish
- Parent(s): Sir William Cavendish; Bess of Hardwick

William Cavendish, 1st Earl of Devonshire (27 December 1552 – 3 March 1626) was an English nobleman, politician, and courtier.

== Early life ==
William Cavendish was the second son of Sir William Cavendish and Bess of Hardwick. Following his father's death and his mother's remarriage to Sir William St Loe he and his elder brother Henry were sent to Eton. He then entered Clare College, Cambridge in 1567, around the time of his mother's marriage to George Talbot, 6th Earl of Shrewsbury, and was admitted to Gray's Inn in 1572 to complete his education. Shrewsbury had promised considerable sums to Cavendish and his younger brother Charles, when they reached 21. In lieu of this Shrewsbury agreed in 1572 that William and Charles should inherit the lands that Bess had brought to the marriage.

== Career ==
By 1584 his mother had purchased land for him worth £15,900 and his standing as a justice of the peace in Derbyshire meant that he was named of the quorum. His mother's marriage had broken down by this time and Cavendish was drawn into an armed conflict with Shrewsbury over his inheritance. He was M.P. for Liverpool in 1586 and Newport (Cornwall) in 1588. His lack of prior links to either place suggests he was nominated by patrons who supported his cause against his stepfather. He was appointed High Sheriff of Derbyshire for 1595.

He was created Baron Cavendish of Hardwick in 1605, thanks to the representations of his niece, Arbella Stuart. He inherited the bulk of his mother's land in 1608 and purchased Chatsworth from his elder brother Henry the following year. He acquired further property, when Henry died childless in 1616.

He participated in the colonisation of the Bermudas, and Devonshire Parish was named after him; he also was a supporter of colonising Virginia. He also invested in the Russia Company, Somers Island Company, and North-West Passage Company, and very heavily but successfully in the East India Company.

He was created Earl of Devonshire on 7 August 1618, while the court was staying at the Bishop of Salisbury's palace; he was reported to have paid £10,000 for the title.

== Death and legacy ==
He died on 3 March 1626, and was buried at St Peter's Church, Edensor. The 1st Earl of Devonshire and his brother Henry (died 1616) are commemorated through the Cavendish Memorial inside the church, a magnificent early-17th-century church monument.

== Family ==
His first wife was Anne Kighley or Keighley, daughter of Henry Kighley of Keighley, Yorkshire, circa 21 March 1580. They had three sons and three daughters, including:

- William Cavendish, 2nd Earl of Devonshire (c. 1590–1628)
- Frances Cavendish (c. 1593–1613), married William Maynard, 1st Baron Maynard
- Gilbert, who has been credited with the authorship of Horae Subsecivae (see Grey Brydges, 5th Baron Chandos), died young
- James, died in infancy

Cavendish's second wife was Elizabeth, daughter of Edward Boughton of Couston, Warwickshire, widow of Sir Richard Wortley of Wortley, Yorkshire, by whom he had a son, John, who was made a knight of the Bath when Prince Charles was created Prince of Wales in 1618. He died without issue 18 January 1619.

Honorary titles
Vacant Title last held by The Earl of Shrewsbury	Lord Lieutenant of Derbyshire jointly with Lord Cavendish of Hardwick; 1619–1626	Succeeded by The Earl of Devonshire
Peerage of England
New title	Earl of Devonshire; 1618–1626	Succeeded by William Cavendish
New title	Baron Cavendish of Hardwick; 1605–1626	Succeeded by William Cavendish
