= Edward Talbot, 8th Earl of Shrewsbury =

English magnate

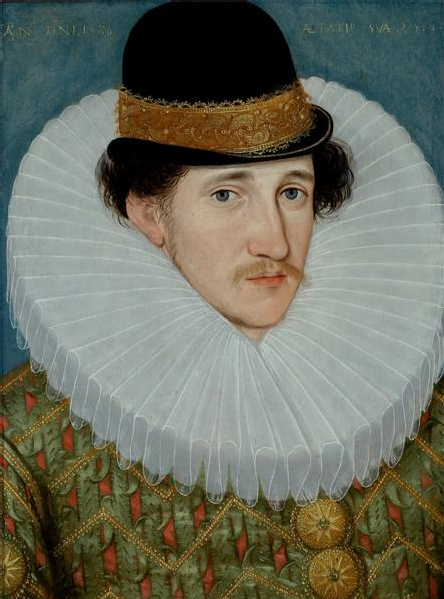
Edward Talbot, later 8th Earl of Shrewsbury, in 1586 aged 25, by Hieronimo Custodis.

Edward Talbot, 8th Earl of Shrewsbury, 8th Earl of Waterford (christened 25 February 1561 – 8 February 1617), was the younger brother and nearest male heir of Gilbert Talbot, 7th Earl of Shrewsbury, whom he succeeded as Earl of Shrewsbury and Lord High Steward of Ireland in 1616.

== Life ==
He was born in Sheffield, the son of George Talbot, 6th Earl of Shrewsbury, by the latter's first marriage to Gertrude Manners, daughter of first Earl of Rutland. He entered Magdalen College, Oxford, in 1579. Edward and his brother Henry Talbot (1563–1596) had an audience with Queen Elizabeth in November 1580.

He served twice as Knight of the Shire (MP) for Northumberland in 1584 and 1586. He was a JP for Northumberland from c. 1592 and appointed Sheriff of Northumberland for 1601 and 1609. He was a member of the Council of the North from 1603 until his death in 1618. He died in London in his 57th year and was buried in Westminster Abbey.

In 1583, he married Joane Ogle, Baroness Ogle, the daughter of Cuthbert Ogle, 7th Baron Ogle. None of their children survived him, and he was succeeded by his nearest male relative, George Talbot of Grafton, who became the 9th Earl. However, some of the extensive family estates passed to the daughters of his elder brother and predecessor and devolved ultimately to the Dukes of Norfolk.

Parliament of England
Preceded by Sir Francis Russell; Thomas Leighton	Member of Parliament for Northumberland; 1584–1587; With: Lord Russell 1584–1585; Sir Thomas Gray 1586–1587	Succeeded by William Carle; Robert Woddrington
Political offices
Preceded by Sir Robert Carey	Custos Rotulorum of Northumberland bef. 1605–1617	Succeeded by Sir Ralph Delaval
Preceded by The Earl of Shrewsbury	Lord High Steward of Ireland; 1616–1617	Succeeded by The Earl of Shrewsbury
Peerage of England
Preceded by Gilbert Talbot	Earl of Shrewsbury; 1616–1617	Succeeded by George Talbot
Peerage of Ireland
Preceded by Gilbert Talbot	Earl of Waterford; 1616–1617	Succeeded by George Talbot
