= George Talbot, 9th Earl of Shrewsbury =

English peer and priest, holder of two earldoms

George Talbot, 9th Earl of Shrewsbury, 9th Earl of Waterford (19 December 1566 – 2 April 1630), was the son of Sir John Talbot (died 1611) of Grafton in Worcestershire, who was a prominent Roman Catholic, frequently fined or imprisoned on account of his faith.

== Life ==
George was educated abroad in Europe at Amiens, France, and in Rome, becoming ordained as a priest in the Catholic Church. He ministered at the court of Maximilian I, Elector of Bavaria at Munich. When he succeeded Edward Talbot, a distant cousin, as Earl of Shrewsbury in 1618, Maximilian successfully interceded with King James I of England to persuade him to allow Talbot to return to England to claim his family estates, take medicinal waters and have free exercise of his religion, intending to be occupied with private study.

George Talbot is thought to be the anonymous English nobleman who in 1612 donated enough money to enable the Jesuits to set up a college at Leuven.

The Earl, who as a Catholic priest never married, died in 1630 aged sixty-three and was buried in the family tomb at the parish church of Albrighton (near Wolverhampton) in Shropshire. He was commemorated in a poem by William Habington.

His nephew John Talbot, son of his brother John Talbot of Longford near Newport, Shropshire, succeeded as 10th Earl.

Political offices
| Preceded by The Earl of Shrewsbury | Lord High Steward of Ireland; 1617–1630 | Succeeded by The Earl of Shrewsbury |
Peerage of England
| Preceded by Edward Talbot | Earl of Shrewsbury; 1617–1630 | Succeeded by John Talbot |
Peerage of Ireland
| Preceded by Edward Talbot | Earl of Waterford; 1617–1630 | Succeeded by John Talbot |
