= Mary Herbert, Countess of Pembroke (died 1649) =

Mary Herbert, Countess of Pembroke (née Talbot; c. 1580 – March 1649) was the wife of William Herbert, 3rd Earl of Pembroke.

Mary was the daughter of Gilbert Talbot, 7th Earl of Shrewsbury, by his wife Mary, and was thus a granddaughter of Bess of Hardwick. She had two sisters, both of whom also married into the nobility: Alethea Howard, Countess of Arundel, and Elizabeth Grey, Countess of Kent.

In 1580, Mary, Queen of Scots, wrote to France for a marten fur and a gold marten's head set with precious stones or a night cap, with a jewelled collar and bracelets, for a christening gift for Gilbert Talbot's daughter, thought to be Mary. In June 1600 she was appointed as gentlewoman of the privy chamber of Queen Elizabeth and her sister Elizabeth was a maid of honour. She married William Herbert on 4 November 1604 at Wilton, Wiltshire, and had one child, Henry, who died in infancy.

Mary Herbert and her sister the Countess of Arundel were asked to "grace the court" during the visit of a French aristocrat, the Count of Vaudémont, in October 1606. Rowland Whyte mentioned a dance at Hampton Court held in the presence chamber of Anne of Denmark. Mary Herbert, described as "Lady Pembroke", danced with a member of the count's entourage, Prince Henry, and the Earl of Perth. Whyte wrote "No lady there did dance near so well as she did that day". Whyte added that the sisters were reluctant to write to their parents themselves. They were joined at Hampton Court by Lady Mary Wroth and Lady Montgomery.

The Talbot Papers, held in Lambeth Palace Library, include several references to Mary. It appears from Thomas Crewe's letter of September 1603 that Sir Thomas Edmondes was instrumental in persuading her father of the advantages of her marrying Pembroke.

Following her husband's death in 1630, the dowager countess sometimes stayed at Baynard's Castle. She died at Ramsbury Manor, Wiltshire, and was buried at Salisbury Cathedral.
