= Gilbert Talbot, 7th Earl of Shrewsbury =

English politician and Earl (1552–1616)

Gilbert Talbot
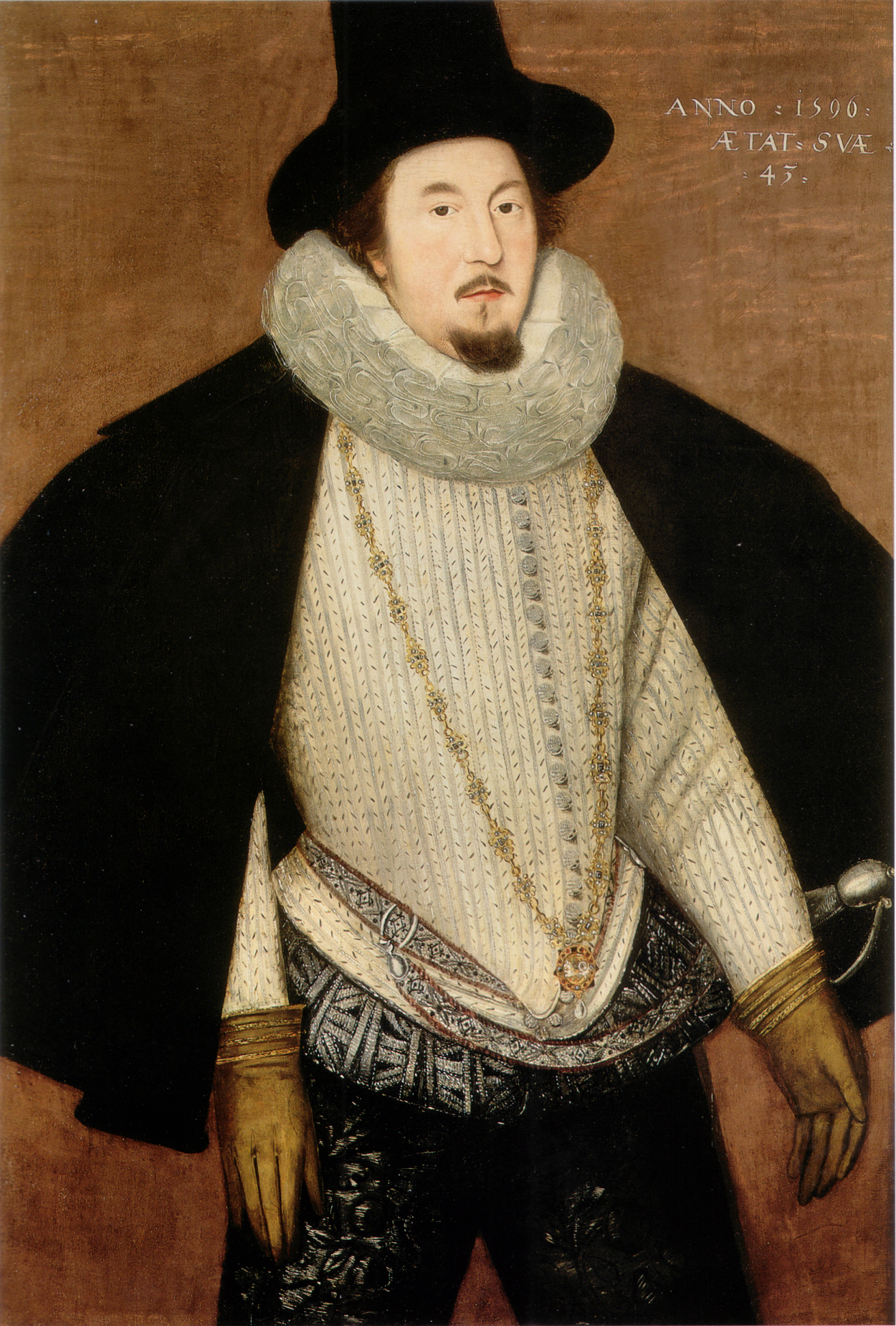
- c. 1596

7th Earl of Shrewsbury
- Reign: 1590–1616
- Predecessor: George Talbot, 6th Earl of Shrewsbury
- Successor: Edward Talbot, 8th Earl of Shrewsbury
- Born: 20 November 1552
- Died: 8 May 1616 (aged 63)
- Noble family: Talbot
- Spouse: Mary Cavendish
- Issue: Mary Herbert, Countess of Pembroke; Elizabeth Grey, Countess of Kent; Alethea Howard, Countess of Arundel
- Father: George Talbot, 6th Earl of Shrewsbury
- Mother: Gertrude Manners

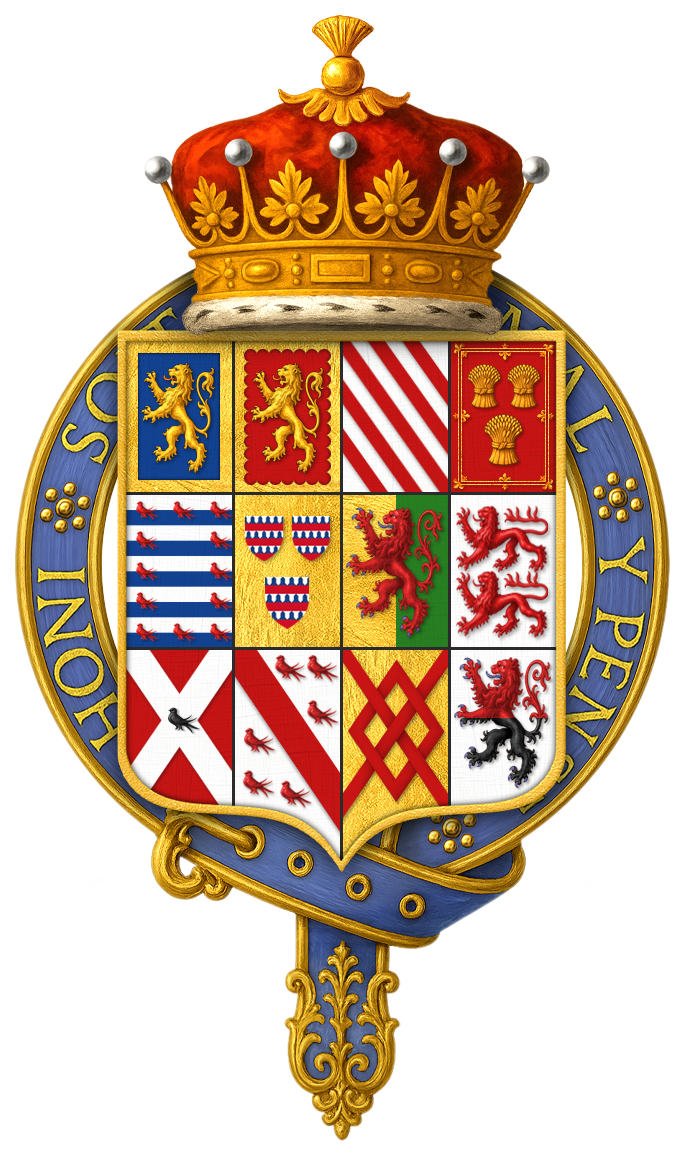
Quartered arms of Sir Gilbert Talbot, 7th Earl of Shrewsbury, KG.

Gilbert Talbot, 7th Earl of Shrewsbury, 7th Earl of Waterford, 13th Baron Talbot, KG (20 November 1552 – 8 May 1616), styled Lord Talbot from 1582 to 1590, was a peer in the peerage of England. He also held the subsidiary titles of 16th Baron Strange of Blackmere and 12th Baron Furnivall.

== Life ==
He was the eldest surviving son of George Talbot, 6th Earl of Shrewsbury, by the latter's first marriage to Gertrude Manners, daughter of the first Earl of Rutland. He was born on 20 November 1553.

On 6 February 1568 Gilbert was married to Mary Cavendish, daughter of his new stepmother, Bess of Hardwick; Mary had inherited much of her formidable mother's strength of character. When Bess and her husband fell out, Gilbert took the side of his wife and his mother-in-law against his own father. However, when the old earl died in 1590, Gilbert refused Bess the widow's portion that was her due, and consequently, they fell out. He appears to have been a highly quarrelsome individual, feuding with not only his stepmother but his brother and other family members, his tenants, and even Elizabeth I herself. He was overshadowed by his formidable wife: Francis Bacon remarked that she was undoubtedly "greater than he".

The children from his marriage to Mary Cavendish were:

- Lady Mary Talbot (1580–1649), who married William Herbert, 3rd Earl of Pembroke
- Lady Elizabeth Talbot (1582–1651), who married Henry Grey, 8th Earl of Kent
- Lady Alethea Talbot (1585–1654), who married Thomas Howard, 21st Earl of Arundel

Two sons, George and John, died in infancy.

Gilbert Talbot was elected knight of the shire (MP) for Derbyshire in 1572. As a New Year Day gift for 1574, Talbot gave his father a perfumed doublet. In January 1575, Talbot and his wife were staying at Goodrich Castle in Herefordshire. He wrote to his father about a new furnace, the price of iron, and workmen employed to fix the pump at the castle well. In 1576, he sent his father a gift of local produce, a Monmouth cap, Ross boots, and perry.

On 1 May 1578, Talbot was walking in the tiltyard, the tournament ground, at Greenwich Palace, and by chance saw Queen Elizabeth at the window of the gallery overlooking the yard, in her nightgown. Later she slapped him on the forehead and told the Lord Chamberlain, Earl of Sussex about the morning's incident. Talbot saw this as a mark of favour and wrote to his father about it.

In January 1589 he wrote to William Cecil from Handsworth Manor commiserating with him over the winter weather, and sent him a blanket and some Hallamshire foodstuffs. He was summoned to the House of Lords as Baron Talbot in 1589 and became 7th Earl of Shrewsbury on his father's death in 1590.

In 1592, he was created a Knight of the Garter, but feuded with his former friend John Stanhope when John's brother got the post of Earl Marshal of England, which Gilbert had assumed would be his. Gilbert's stepbrother Charles Cavendish challenged Stanhope to a duel for his sake, which was not fought. (Stanhope was discovered to be wearing a sword-proof doublet). Elizabeth I was displeased and took Stanhope's side. After this Gilbert challenged his own brother Edward to a duel over a lease, but Edward refused to fight him. Gilbert accused his brother of planning to poison him, but lost his case against him.

Shrewsbury employed a clockmaker, Michael Neuwers to make striking clocks in 1599. He hosted a magnificent dinner in London for a French ambassador Aymar Chaste in May 1600 and afterwards a large crowd was entertained by a French acrobat performing on a rope.

=== Reign of James VI and I ===
At the Union of the Crowns in 1603, Shrewsbury wrote to James VI and I inviting him to stay with him during his progress to London. Shrewsbury hosted the Stuart royal family at Worksop Manor as they travelled south. King James visited first, and was welcomed by huntsmen dressed in green. Anne of Denmark, Princess Elizabeth, and Prince Henry came in June. Shrewsbury made friends with the queen's secretary William Fowler. Her crowd of followers was disorderly, and Shrewsbury, with the Duke of Lennox and Earl of Cumberland made a proclamation at Worksop that any followers without formal roles should leave.

Shrewsbury became a patron of the arts, as was his daughter Alethea, who became Countess of Arundel by her marriage to Thomas Howard in 1606. Shrewsbury was also interested in sport, though sometimes had gout, and he wrote in September 1607 that he was laid up on a couch at Sheffield Lodge, "neither fit for football nor tennis". He sent the Earl of Shrewsbury a case of knives with handles representing the twelve Apostles, of Sheffield workmanship.

As well as bringing up their three daughters, Gilbert and Mary Talbot spent a good deal of time with their orphaned niece, Arbella Stuart. The downfall of Arbella, who as the closest relative of King James I of England had greatly offended him by marrying without his consent, had serious consequences for Gilbert and Mary: Mary, who had aided the marriage, went to the Tower of London as a result, and Gilbert lost his seat on the Privy Council.

== Death ==
In the absence of a male heir, he was succeeded in the earldom of Shrewsbury by his younger brother, Edward. However, some of the extensive estates passed then (or after Edward's death) to his daughters. There were rumours that Edward Talbot had had him poisoned using a pair of perfumed gloves.

== Notes ==
Political offices
Preceded by The 6th Earl of Shrewsbury	Lord High Steward of Ireland; 1590–1616	Succeeded by The 8th Earl of Shrewsbury
Preceded by The 6th Earl of Shrewsbury	Lord Lieutenant of Derbyshire; 1590–1616	Vacant Title next held by The Earl of Devonshire; Lord Cavendish of Hardwick
Peerage of England
Preceded by George Talbot	Earl of Shrewsbury; 1590–1616	Succeeded by Edward Talbot
Preceded by George Talbot	Baron Talbot (writ in acceleration); 1589–1616	In abeyance Title next held by Alethea Howard as sole heiress
Preceded by George Talbot	Baron Furnivall; 1590–1616	In abeyance Title next held by Alethea Howard as sole heiress
Preceded by George Talbot	Baron Strange of Blackmere; 1590–1616	In abeyance Title next held by Alethea Howard as sole heiress
Peerage of Ireland
Preceded by George Talbot	Earl of Waterford; 1590–1616	Succeeded by Edward Talbot
