= Bess of Hardwick =

English noblewoman and businesswoman (1527–1608)

- Countess of Shrewsbury
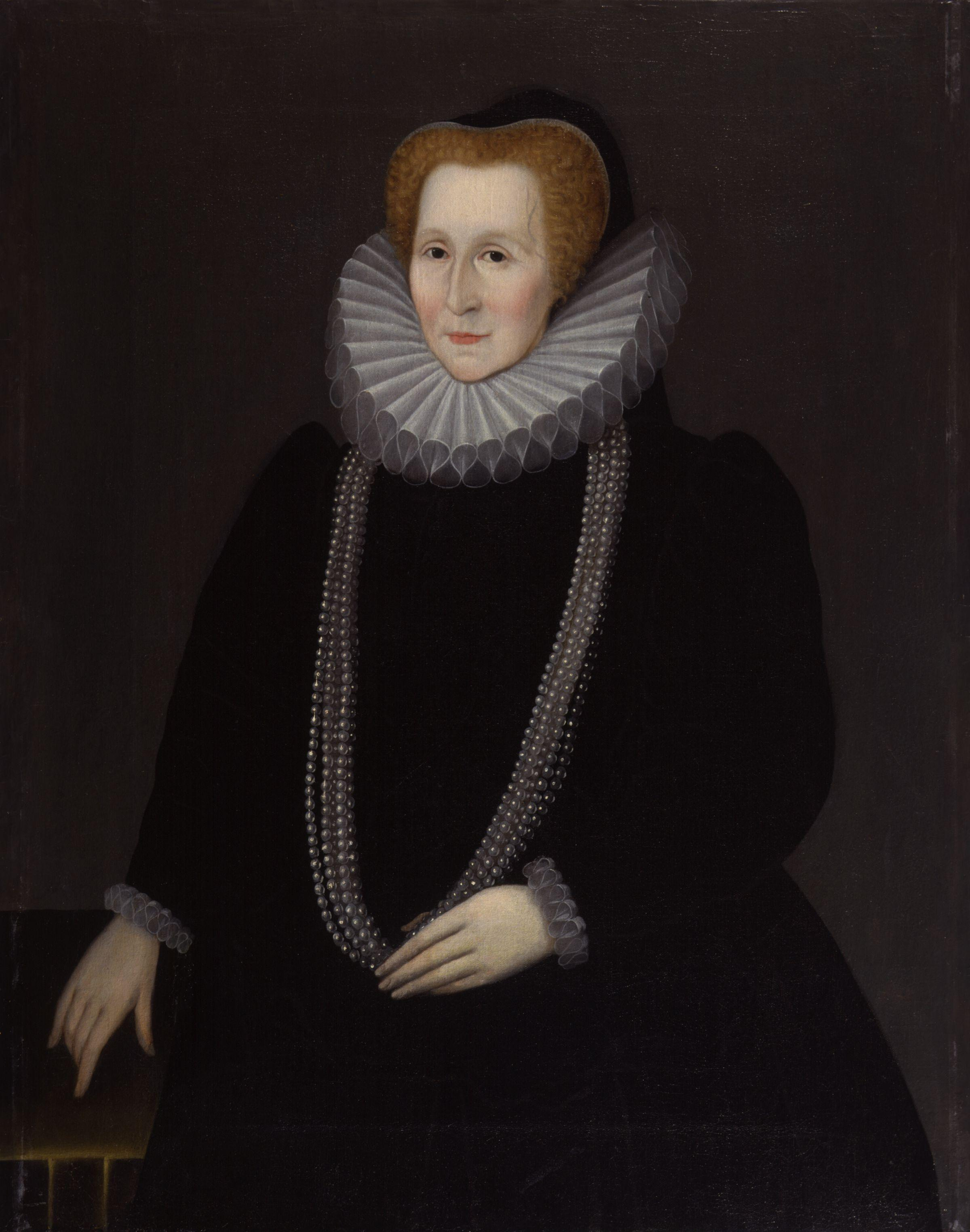
- Bess of Hardwick, Countess of Shrewsbury, by Rowland Lockey, 1592 in the collection of the National Portrait Gallery, London
- Born: c. 27 July 1527
- Died: 13 February 1608
- Buried: All Saints Church, Derby
- Noble family: Hardwick
- Spouses: Robert Barley (m. 1543; died 1544) Sir William Cavendish (m. 1547; died 1557) Sir William St Loe (m. 1559; died 1565) George Talbot, 6th Earl of Shrewsbury (m. 1568; died 1590)
- Issue: Frances Cavendish; Temperance Cavendish; Henry Cavendish; William Cavendish, 1st Earl of Devonshire; Charles Cavendish; Elizabeth Stuart, Countess of Lennox; Mary Talbot, Countess of Shrewsbury; Lucrece Cavendish
- Father: John Hardwick
- Mother: Elizabeth Leeke

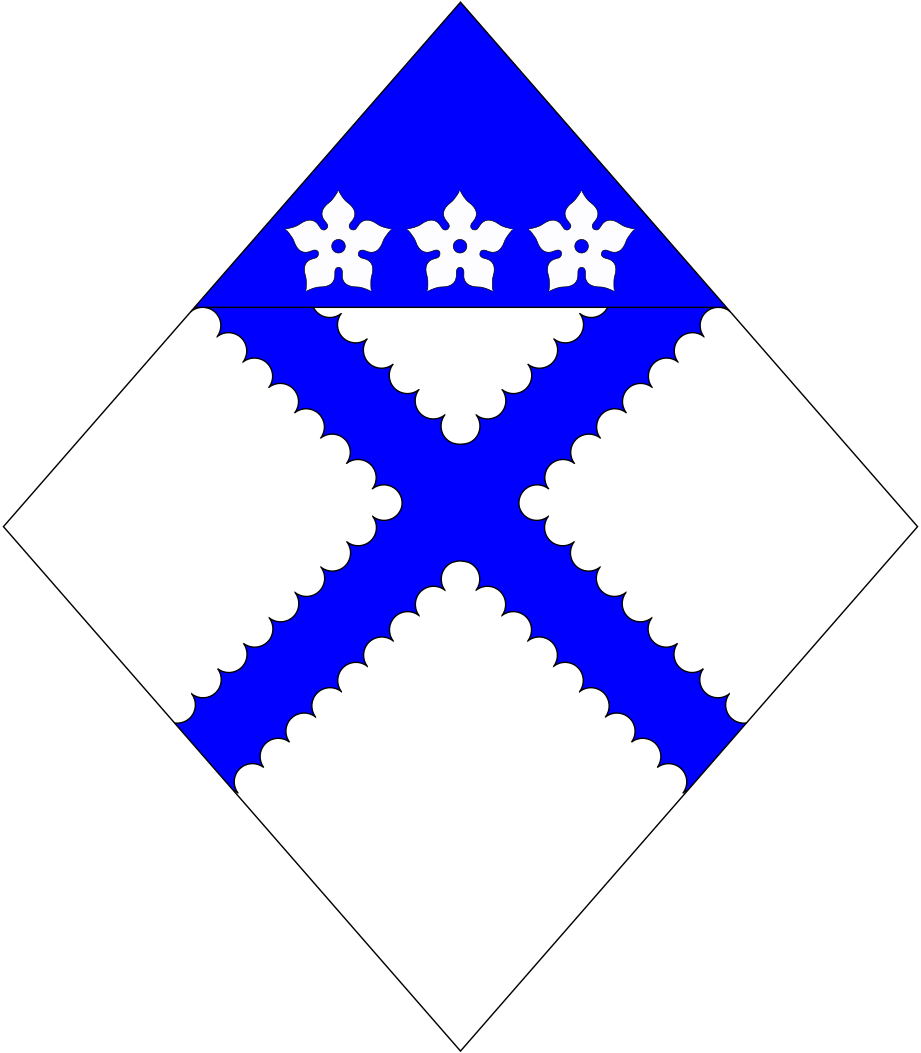
Arms of Elizabeth Hardwick, as displayed on the plaster over mantle in the great hall of Hardwick Hall: Argent, a saltire engrailed azure on a chief of the second three cinquefoils of the first. Lozenge-shaped shield as appropriate for a female armiger

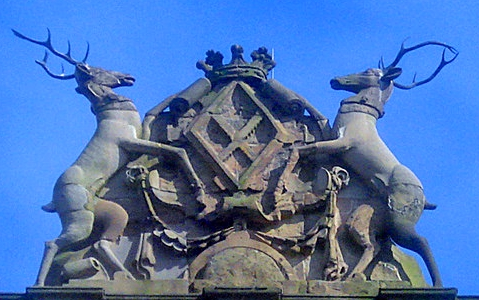
Arms of Elizabeth Hardwick displayed on parapet above main entrance of Hardwick Hall. The supporters two stags are those of the Cavendish family

Elizabeth Cavendish, later Elizabeth Talbot, Countess of Shrewsbury (née Hardwick; c. 27 July 1527 – 13 February 1608), known as Bess of Hardwick, of Hardwick Hall, Derbyshire, was a figure in Elizabethan English society. By a series of well-made marriages, she rose to the highest levels of English nobility and became wealthy. Bess was reportedly a shrewd businesswoman, increasing her assets with business interests including mines and glass-making workshops.

She was married four times. Her first husband was Robert Barley (or Barlow), who died aged about 14 or 15 on 24 December 1544. Her second husband was the courtier Sir William Cavendish. Her third husband was Sir William St Loe. Her last husband was George Talbot, 6th Earl of Shrewsbury, sometime keeper to the captive Mary, Queen of Scots. An accomplished needlewoman, Bess joined her husband's captive charge at Chatsworth House for extended periods in 1569, 1570, and 1571, during which time they worked together on the Oxburgh Hangings.

In 1601, Bess ordered an inventory of the household furnishings, including textiles, at her three properties at Chatsworth, Hardwick, and Chelsea, which survives. In her will she bequeathed these items to her heirs to be preserved in perpetuity. The 400-year-old collection, now known as the Hardwick Hall textiles, is the largest collection of tapestry, embroidery, canvaswork, and other textiles to have been preserved by a single private family. Bess embarked on building projects, the most famous of which are Chatsworth, now the seat of the Dukes of Devonshire (whose family name is Cavendish as they descend from the children of her second marriage), and Hardwick Hall.

== Origins ==
Elizabeth Hardwick was the daughter of John Hardwick of Derbyshire and his wife Elizabeth Leeke, daughter of Thomas Leeke and Margaret Fox. Her exact birthdate is unknown, occurring in the period 1521 to 1527; that said, according to her witness statement under oath at a court hearing in October 1546, in which she gives her age at the time of her first marriage in May 1543 as being "of tender years", i.e. less than 16, would indicate 1527. It cannot be later than 1527 because of the date of her father's death, given in his Inquisition Post Mortem.

The Hardwicks had arrived in Derbyshire from Sussex by the mid-thirteenth century, and farmed land granted by Robert Savage, lord of the manor of Stainsby, on the north-east border of Derbyshire, looking over Nottinghamshire. By the mid-fifteenth century the family had risen to "gentleman-yeoman" stock, with an estate of a few hundred acres located mainly in the parish of Ault Hucknall in the manor of Stainsby. The Hardwick coat of arms was probably granted c. 1450 to William Hardwick. The blazon is: Argent, a saltier engrailed azure on a chief of the second three cinquefoils of the first. When giving evidence of his right to arms in 1569, Bess's only brother, James Hardwick (1525-1580/1), provided the heralds with a pedigree of his family which began with this William, who died c. 1453.

James was the last surviving legitimate male member of the Hardwick family. The Hardwicks were members of the minor gentry of Scarsdale; no male member of the Hardwick family rose above the status of esquire or held any important local or county offices. Bess was born into this relatively minor gentry family. Her fourth marriage to the earl of Shrewsbury in 1567 elevated her to the rank of "countess", and following the earl's death in November 1590, Bess became one of the richest women in the kingdom. She set about building her greatest monument, Hardwick New Hall, which was completed in 1599.

== Early life ==
John Hardwick died aged about 40 leaving a widow, son (and heir), and four daughters (five daughters were alive at the time he wrote his will). His widow Elizabeth Leeke then married Ralph, the second son of the neighbouring Leche (or Leach) family of Chatsworth, in Derbyshire, by whom she would leave an additional three co-heiresses.

Little is known of Bess's early life. She appears to have been espoused to her first husband during the 1530s, and probably married for the first time in 1543. Despite the story being often repeated, there is no contemporary evidence whatsoever to support Dugdale's later claims that she became familiar with city life and the Tudor Court after being sent to live, aged twelve, in the London household of Anne Gainsford, Lady Zouche of Codnor Castle in Derbyshire, where she was supposedly influenced by Lady Zouche. Despite a lack of evidence, it is possible – but no more than that – that at some point, perhaps after the death of her first husband, she entered the service of the Zouches at Codnor Castle in Derbyshire.

A close family associate was a man named Henry Marmion whose family held land close to Codnor, and may have commended Bess to the Zouches who, along with the Vernons, were the only major Derbyshire family likely to have taken in such children. However, Anne Gainsford was in service in the households of Anne Boleyn and Jane Seymour, and despite marrying Sir George Zouche in 1533, spent much of her time at court until after 1536, when she and Sir George made Codnor Castle their main residence. Not surprisingly, this period coincides with the time that Dugdale claimed Bess was in service to Anne Gainsford in London and at Codnor. However, there is no evidence to support the story, and Dugdale would have known much more about the early life of Lady Zouche than was known of Bess's origins. Again, according to Dugdale, from Codnor Bess entered the service of the Greys at Bradgate in Leicestershire, where she met and married her second husband, Sir William Cavendish. She certainly married Sir William at Bradgate, but that in itself does not prove that Bess was in service at Bradgate. It remains possible that she met Sir William elsewhere, possibly at Codnor. More likely, she was recommended to the Greys by Henry Grey's sister, Margaret, Lady Willoughby. Henry Marmion was one the Willoughby's most trusted upper servants, he was also one of the two men appointed in Bess's father's will and guardians of his children. (the other was Bess's uncle, John Leake).

== Bess's four marriages ==
=== First marriage ===
In 1543, Bess married 13-year-old Robert Barley (or Barlow), heir to a neighbouring estate. The exact date of her marriage to Robert is unknown. It is thought that the marriage took place late May 1543, shortly before the death of Robert's father on 28 May. There is no evidence that they lived together as husband and wife. Robert died in December 1544. There was no issue from the marriage, which had been arranged locally, probably initially to protect the Barley patrimony and to mitigate the impact of wardship on the Barley estate should Robert succeed his father as an underage heir. The traditional story that Robert and Bess met in London while in the service of a "Lady Zouche" is based on oral history, which can only be dated to the late seventeenth century (some eighty years after Bess's death). The marital claims to Robert's estate were disputed, and following his death Bess was refused dower by Peter Freschevile. A court battle ensued, which resulted in Bess being awarded her claim on the Barley estate and compensation, albeit several years after Robert's death.

=== Second marriage ===
Arms of Cavendish: Sable, three buck's heads cabossed argent

On 20 August 1547, Bess married the twice-widowed Sir William Cavendish, Treasurer of the King's Chamber, and became Lady Cavendish. The wedding took place at two o'clock in the morning, at the home of the Grey family, friends of the couple. Sir William was more than twice Bess's age and the father of two daughters. His fortune had been made following the Dissolution of the Monasteries, since as an official of the Court of Augmentations he was able to select choice properties for himself. Possibly acting on Bess's advice, Sir William sold his lands in the south of England and bought the Chatsworth estates in her home county of Derbyshire. Sir William Cavendish died on 25 October 1557, leaving Bess widowed a second time and in deep debt to the Crown. Upon his death, Bess claimed the sum of his property, having insisted that his land be settled on their heirs. The eight children of the marriage, two of whom died in infancy, were as follows:

- Frances Cavendish (18 June 1548 – January 1632), the eldest child, married Sir Henry Pierrepont, MP. Their children were:
  - Robert Pierrepont, 1st Earl of Kingston-upon-Hull who married Gertrude Talbot. They had five sons including Henry Pierrepont, 1st Marquess of Dorchester and William Pierrepoint, MP. Robert was also the forebear of the Dukes of Kingston-upon-Hull, extinct since 1773. The Earls Manvers (extinct in 1955) succeeded to the Pierrepont Estates.
  - Elizabeth Pierrepont married Sir Thomas Erskine, first Earl of Kellie.
  - Grace Pierrepont married Sir George Manners. They had four children, including John Manners, 8th Earl of Rutland.
- Temperance Cavendish (10 June 1549 – 1550), 2nd child, died in infancy.
- Henry Cavendish (17 December 1550 – 28 October 1616), 3rd child, a godson of Queen Elizabeth I. He married Grace Talbot. Henry Cavendish is the forebear of the Barons Waterpark. The title of Baron Waterpark is extant. He hated his wife and had no legitimate children. Instead he had eight illegitimate children, four boys and four girls. After attempting and failing to liberate his niece Arbella Stuart from his mother's estate, he was disinherited by his mother. Bess referred to him as "my bad son Henry".
- William Cavendish, 1st Earl of Devonshire (27 December 1552 – 3 March 1626), 4th child, forebear of the extant Dukes of Devonshire.
- Charles Cavendish (28 November 1553 – 4 April 1617), 5th child, a godson of Queen Mary I of England. He married Catherine Ogle, 8th Baroness Ogle. They had a son:
  - William Cavendish, 1st Duke of Newcastle-upon-Tyne, forebear of the Dukes of Newcastle, extinct since 1691. The Barony of Ogle is in abeyance, as more than one person has a legal right to claim the title. The estates passed through to the female line to the Dukes of Portland and Newcastle-under-Lyne, both now extinct.
- Elizabeth Cavendish (31 March 1555 – 21 January 1582), 6th child, wife of Charles Stuart, 1st Earl of Lennox. They had a daughter:
  - Lady Arbella Stuart, 2nd Countess of Lennox, married William Seymour, 2nd Duke of Somerset, an extant title.
- Mary Cavendish (January 1556 – April 1632), 7th child, wife of Gilbert Talbot, 7th Earl of Shrewsbury. They had five children including:
  - Lady Alatheia (or Alethea) Talbot, who married Thomas Howard, 1st Earl of Norfolk. The title of Duke of Norfolk is extant.
  - Lady Mary Talbot who married William Herbert, 3rd Earl of Pembroke. The title Earl of Pembroke is extant.
  - Lady Elizabeth Talbot married Henry Grey, 8th Earl of Kent. The title Earl of Kent from the Grey family has been extinct since 1740.
- Lucrece Cavendish (born and died 1556), 8th child, probably the twin of Mary.

=== Third marriage ===
In 1559 Bess married a third time, to Sir William St Loe (1518–1565) (alias St Lowe, Saintlowe, Sentloe, etc.) and became Lady St Loe. Her new husband was Captain of the Guard to Queen Elizabeth I and Chief Butler of England. Due to his relationship with Queen Elizabeth I, he was able to reduce the debt Bess owed and paid it back in full on her behalf. He owned large West Country estates at Tormarton in Gloucestershire and Chew Magna in Somerset, while his principal residence was at Sutton Court in Stowey. When he died without male issue in 1564/5, in suspicious circumstances (probably poisoned by his younger brother), he left everything to Bess, to the detriment of his daughters and brother. In addition to her own six surviving children, Bess was now responsible for the two daughters of Sir William St Loe from his first marriage. However, those two daughters were already adults and otherwise well provided for.

Sir William St Loe's death left Bess one of the wealthiest women in England. Her annual income was calculated to amount to £60,000, equivalent to £22,000,000 in 2025. Further, she was a Lady of the Bedchamber with daily access to the Queen, whose favour she enjoyed. Still in her late 30s, Bess retained her looks and good health, and a number of important men began courting her.

=== Fourth marriage ===
Arms of Talbot: Gules, a lion rampant within a bordure engrailled or

Despite being courted by several suitors, Bess did not remarry until 1568, when she married for the fourth time to become Countess of Shrewsbury. Her new husband, George Talbot, 6th Earl of Shrewsbury, was one of the premier aristocrats of the realm, and the father of seven children by his first marriage. Indeed, two of his children were married to two of hers in a double ceremony in February 1568: Bess's daughter Mary Cavendish, aged 12, was given in marriage to Shrewsbury's eldest son Gilbert, aged 16; while Bess's son, Sir Henry Cavendish, aged 18, married Shrewsbury's daughter Lady Grace Talbot, aged 8.

=== Bess and Mary, Queen of Scots ===
In the year before Bess and the Earl of Shrewsbury were married, a political disturbance arose in Scotland, which would profoundly affect their lives. Rebel Scottish lords rose up against Mary, Queen of Scots, imprisoned her, and forced her to abdicate in favour of her infant son, James. In May 1568, Mary escaped and fled south towards England, seeking the protection of her cousin, Queen Elizabeth. However, the English authorities were not sure how to receive her. On 18 May, she was taken into protective custody at Carlisle Castle by local officials.

Queen Elizabeth felt obliged to host and protect Mary, her cousin, against the rebellious Scottish lords. However, due to Mary's persistent claim to the English throne, Elizabeth also regarded her as a threat. Elizabeth had Mary moved to Bolton Castle in Yorkshire, where she was lodged under the guard of Francis Knollys, pending the York Conference inquiry, regarding Mary's fate. The inquiry results were inconclusive; yet Elizabeth did not set Mary free.

Instead, Mary would be detained under the custody of the Earl of Shrewsbury and his wife Bess. Elizabeth's instruction to Bess and her husband amounted to little more than Mary's house arrest. Mary reached her new residence, Tutbury Castle, in February 1569, when she was 26 years old, and would remain in the custody of Shrewsbury and Bess for 15 years. While in the care of the earl and countess, Queen Mary lived at one or another of their many houses in the Midlands: Tutbury, Wingfield Manor, Chatsworth House, Sheffield Castle, and Sheffield Manor.

Throughout this period, Bess spent time as Mary's companion, working with her on embroidery and textile projects. Indeed, all Mary's work later became part of Bess's historical collection at Hardwick Hall.

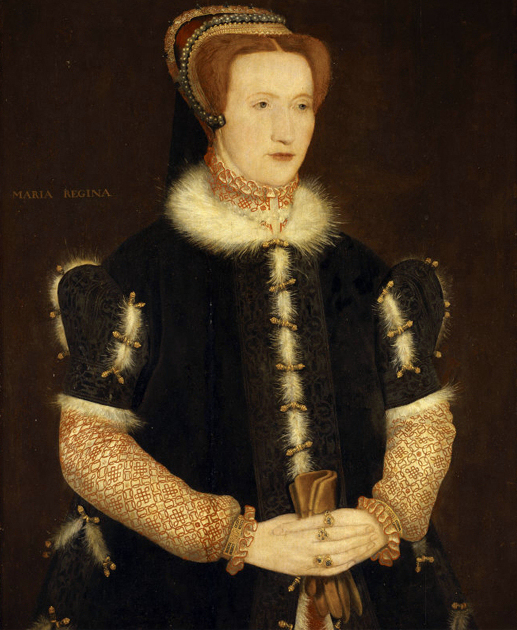
Bess of Hardwick, 1550s

Bess joined Mary at Chatsworth for extended periods in 1569, 1570, and 1571, during which time they worked together on the Oxburgh Hangings. Bess sent Elizabeth I a remarkable dress as a New Year's Day gift for 1577, according to Elizabeth Wingfield, who wrote;

Her Majesty never liked any thing you gave her so well, the colour and strange trimming of the garments, with the rich and great cost bestowed upon that, has caused her to give out such good speeches of my lord and your Ladyship as I never heard of better, she told my Lord of Leicester and my Lord Chamberlain that you had given her such garments this year as she never had any so well liked her, and said that good noble couple, they show in all things what love they bear me.

Elizabeth shifted the costs of the imprisonment to Shrewsbury. It was recorded that Mary would use the couple's insecurities against each other, even convincing Talbot that Bess was stealing. Mary's presence in their home, as well as the financial costs and political tensions, may have contributed to a rift between Shrewsbury and Bess.

It was not until Mary was removed to another keeper, Sir Amias Paulet, that she got into the trouble that would lead ultimately to her execution. Previous to the Queen's change in custody, Shrewsbury and Bess separated for good. They had been apart, off and on, since about 1580; and even Queen Elizabeth had tried to get them to reconcile. Mary seems to have aggravated, if not created, their problems by playing them off against each other. The Countess spread rumours that her husband Shrewsbury had been in a relationship with Mary, a charge which has never been proved or disproved, and in any case which she later retracted. Mary was outraged and wrote a famous "scandal letter" listing comments that Bess had allegedly made about Elizabeth.

== The Stuart connection ==
In 1574 Bess arranged a marriage between one of her daughters and the son of the Countess of Lennox. This was a significant match for Bess because the Countess of Lennox was Margaret Douglas, a member of the royal family, being the daughter of Margaret Tudor, Queen Dowager of Scotland and sister of Henry VIII, and therefore, also Queen Elizabeth's first cousin.

In this match, the bride was Bess's daughter, Elizabeth Cavendish, and the groom was Charles Stuart, who was himself also the first cousin of Mary, Queen of Scots (through their grandmother, the same Margaret Tudor). The groom was also the younger brother of Henry Stuart, Lord Darnley who had been married to Mary until his death. This marriage, therefore, enabled a claim to the throne for any of Bess's grandchildren born of the marriage.

The marriage ceremony took place without the knowledge of Shrewsbury, who, though well aware of the suggested match some time prior to this event, declined to accept any responsibility. Due to the Lennox family's claim to the throne, the marriage was considered potentially treasonable, since Queen Elizabeth's consent had not been obtained.

The Countess of Lennox, mother of the bridegroom, went to the Tower for several months, and Bess was ordered to London to face an official inquiry, but she ignored the summons, and remained in Sheffield until the row died down. The child of the marriage was Arbella Stuart, who had a claim to the thrones of Scotland and England as the second cousin to King James VI of Scotland (later King James I of England), through their great-grandmother, Margaret Tudor.

Arbella was at times invited to Elizabeth's court, but spent most of her time with her grandmother. A BBC documentary showed that Bess very much desired Arbella to become Queen, even imprisoning the young lady to prevent her from eloping. Arbella blamed her grandmother for this, and the two fell out irrevocably when Arbella attempted to run away and marry a man who, as a descendant of Henry VII, also had a claim to the throne. Bess cut Arbella from her will and begged the Queen to take her granddaughter off her hands.

Arbella's royal claim was never recognized. Despite disinheriting Arbella and her eldest son (Henry: for aiding Arbella's escape); Bess later had a "lukewarm reconciliation with her granddaughter. Bess has been an ancestor of the royal line since 1952; Queen Elizabeth II being Bess's descendant through the dukes of Portland, in whose family was Elizabeth II's maternal grandmother, Cecilia Cavendish-Bentinck.

== Later life ==
On the death of her husband in 1590, Bess became Dowager Countess of Shrewsbury. She lived mostly at Hardwick, where she built the new mansion Hardwick Hall, which inspired the rhyme, "Hardwick Hall, more glass than wall", because of the number and size of its windows. She was one of the greatest builders of her time at Hardwick, Chatsworth House, and Oldcoates.

In 1604 Bess was involved with Queen Anne in an unsuccessful attempt to found a college or university at Ripon in Yorkshire. The scheme was promoted by Cecily Sandys, the widow of the Bishop Edwin Sandys.

== Death and burial ==
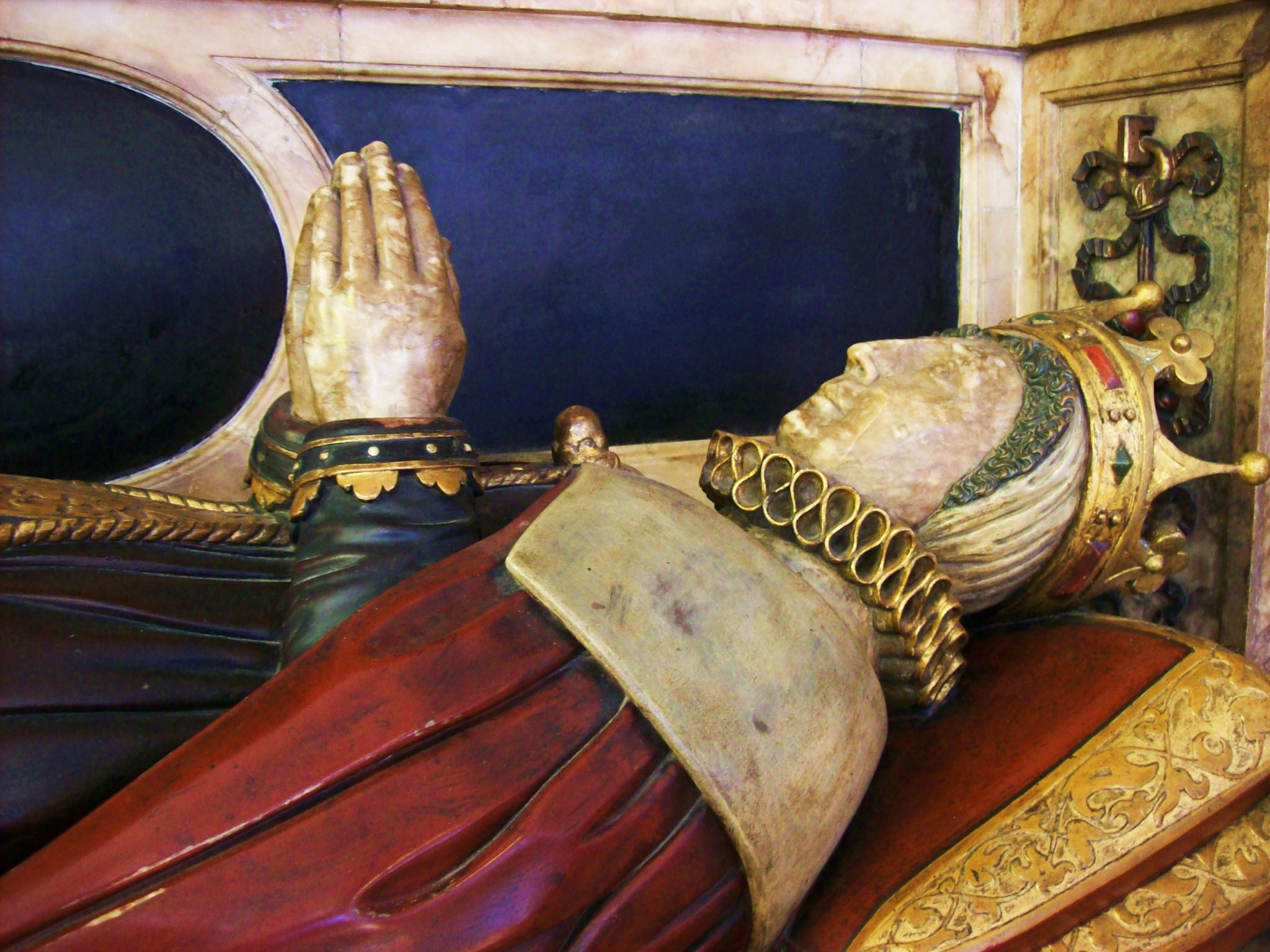
Effigy of Elizabeth Hardwick wearing a coronet of a countess. Derby Cathedral

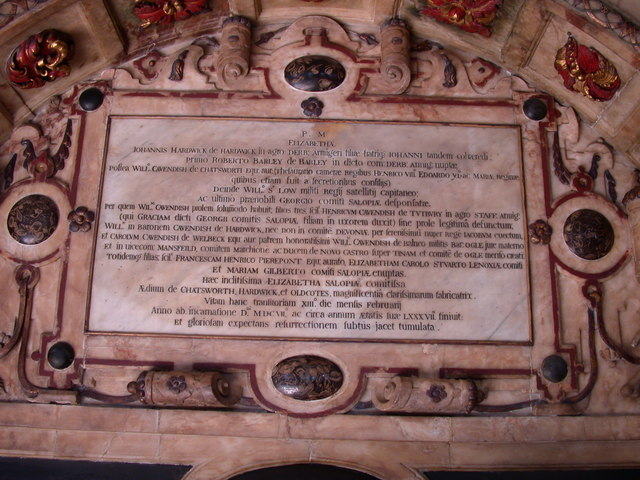
Inscribed memorial tablet above the effigy of Elizabeth Hardwick in Derby Cathedral

Bess of Hardwick died at 5 pm on Saturday 13 February 1608, aged c.87. At the time of her death she remained "one of the richest, and most powerful women in the kingdom". On 16 February her body was placed in a vault in All Saints Church, Derby, then the parish church of that city (demolished 1723 and rebuilt, since 1927 Derby Cathedral), under an elaborate monument with a laudatory inscription which she took care to put up in her lifetime. The monument with effigy survives, having been saved from the former demolished building. Stories of her body lying in state for weeks in the Great Chamber at Hardwick are mythical. Her accumulated estates were left to her children from her second marriage.

== Fiction ==
=== Television ===
- A 10-part BBC series about Bess titled Mistress of Hardwick was broadcast in 1972, with Hilary Mason in the title role. The script was written by Alison Plowden, and the series won the Writers' Guild Award for the best educational television series. Most of the episodes are now lost. Plowden wrote a tie-in book, also called Mistress of Hardwick, which was published by the BBC in April 1972.

=== Film ===
- She is portrayed by Gemma Chan in the 2018 movie Mary Queen of Scots.

=== Literature ===
- Bess is the main character in Venus in Winter by Gillian Bagwell (2 July 2013).
- Bess of Hardwick is a character in The Other Queen by Philippa Gregory.
- Bess is the title character of A Woman of Passion by Virginia Henley.
- She also features prominently in the book The Captive Queen of Scots by Jean Plaidy.
- She is the title character in the novel The Queenmaker by Maureen Peters.
- She appears in The Secret Confessions of Anne Shakespeare by Arliss Ryan.
- She is the main character in the Jan Westcott historical/biographical fiction novel The Tower and The Dream.
- In Dorothy Sayers's novel Gaudy Night, Bess of Hardwick is referred to as the mother of Mary, Countess of Shrewsbury, the patroness of the fictitious Shrewsbury College at Oxford.
- Bess of Hardwick is the narrator of Petticoat King, a 1929 novel by Miriam Michelson.
- Bess is a character in the short story "Antickes and Frets" by Susanna Clarke, in her 2006 collection The Ladies of Grace Adieu and Other Stories.

=== Music ===
- The song "Hardwick's Lofty Towers" by Sarah McQuaid is from the perspective of Bess. It appears on her 2012 album The Plum Tree and the Rose.

== Bibliography ==
- Jamison, Catherine; Batho, G. R. (1971). A Calendar of the Talbot Papers in the College of Arms. London: Derbyshire Archaeology Society / HMC /HMSO. OCLC 535572.
- Bill, E. G. W (1966). A Calendar of the Shrewsbury Papers in Lambeth Palace Library. London: Derbyshire Archaeology Society / HMC/ HMSO.
- Costello, Louisa Stuart (1844). Memoirs of Eminent Englishwomen, Vol. 1. "Elizabeth, Countess of Shrewsbury". London: Richard Bentley.
- Digby, George Wingfield (1964). Elizabethan Embroidery. New York: Thomas Yoseloff.
- Durant, David N. (1977). Bess of Hardwick: Portrait of an Elizabethan Dynasty. London: Weidenfeld and Nicolson. ISBN 0-297-77305-4.
- Durant, David N. (1977). Bess of Hardwick: Portrait of an Elizabethan Dynasty (American ed.). New York: Atheneum. ISBN 0-689-10835-4.
- Eisenberg, Elizabeth (1985). This Costly Countess: Bess of Hardwick. Derby: Hall. ISBN 0-946404-95-X.
- Hubbard, Kate (2001). Material Girl: Bess of Hardwick: 1527–1608. London: Short Books. ISBN 0-571-20800-2.
- Kettle, Pamela (2000). Oldcotes: The Last Mansion Built by Bess of Hardwick. Cardiff: Merton Priory Press. ISBN 1-898937-39-7.
- Kilburn, Terry (2014). "The Wardship and Marriage of Robert Barley, First Husband of Bess of Hardwick, pp 197 – 203, Derbyshire Archaeological Journal, Vol 134, 2014". The Derbyshire Archaeological Journal. Derbyshire Archaeological Society. ISSN 0070-3788.
- Kilburn, Terry (2024). Bess of Hardwick: Myths & Realities. London: Austin-Macauley Publishers. ISBN 978-1-0358443-1-9.
- Levey, Santina; Peter Thornton (2001). Of Houshold Stuff: The 1601 Inventory of Bess of Hardwick. London: National Trust. ISBN 0-7078-0329-2.
- Levey, Santina (1998). An Elizabethan Inheritance: The Hardwick Hall Textiles. London: National Trust. ISBN 1-905400-21-7.
- Lovell, Mary S. (2006). Bess of Hardwick: First Lady of Chatsworth: 1527–1608 (American ed.). New York: Norton. ISBN 0-393-06221-X.
- Lovell, Mary S. (2005). Bess of Hardwick: First Lady of Chatsworth: 1527–1608 (British ed.). London: Little-Brown. ISBN 0-316-72482-3.
- Pearson, John (1984). The Serpent and the Stag. New York: Holt, Rinehart, & Winston. ISBN 978-0-03-055431-5.
- Plowden, Alison (1972). Mistress of Hardwick. London: BBC. ISBN 0-563-10664-6.
- Rowse, A.L. (1983). Eminent Elizabethans. Athens, Georgia: The University of Georgia Press. ISBN 9780820306490.
- Westcott, Jan (1974). The Tower and the Dream. New York.: Putnam. ISBN 0-399-11128-X. [Biographical fiction]
- Williams, Ethel Carleton (1977). Bess of Hardwick. Bath: Chivers. ISBN 0-85997-238-0.[Biography]
