= William St Loe =

16th-century English politician and courtier

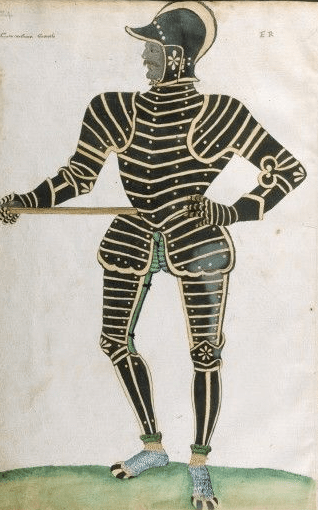
William St Loe

Sir William St Loe (1518–1565) was a 16th-century English soldier, politician and courtier. He was the third husband of Bess of Hardwick, his second wife. His official positions included Captain of the Yeomen of the Guard, Chief Butler of England and Member of Parliament for Derbyshire.

== Lineage ==
He was the eldest son of Sir John St Loe, Sheriff of Gloucestershire, MP for Somerset and Gloucestershire, of an Anglo-Norman warrior family first mentioned at the court of Henry I in 1100, and his wife, Dame Margaret. Their seat was a manor house, Sutton Court, Chew Magna, Somerset, built upon the foundations of a 13th-century castle. Several generations of St Loes kept at the ready a force of a hundred mounted soldiers for the king's service and were repeatedly chosen as "Attendant Knights" at royal funerals.

== Biography ==
Sir William's tutor was the distinguished scholar and grammarian John Palsgrave, who had a high opinion of him. Hardened by service with his father in Ireland, he received a courtly polish as a gentleman usher in the grand household of Henry Courtenay, Marquess of Exeter.

His first wife was Jane, daughter of Sir Edward Bayntun of Bromham, Wiltshire, with whom according to the Baynton entry in the 1565 Visitation records for Wiltshire, he had two daughters. Jane died in 1548. There is no entry for the St Loes in the 1565 visitation record. No daughters are mentioned in his will and the 1623 entry for the St Lowe family states that William died without issue. He was knighted for his services in Ireland, in Dublin, January 1549. On his final return from Ireland he was appointed to head the security detail for the princess Elizabeth. The St Loe family, staunch Protestants, had been implicated in the movement to place Lady Jane Grey on the throne and in Wyatt's rebellion, for which he was held and examined in the Tower of London. Unlike others, he did not give anything away that might implicate Elizabeth. Immediately after her succession, she made him Captain of her Personal Guard.

== Second marriage ==
In January 1559, he married Bess of Hardwick. Their marriage was happy, but William's younger brother Edward, fearing that a son of their marriage would rob him of his inheritance, became their enemy. In 1560, Bess was poisoned, but recovered. Both William and his mother suspected Edward. In 1564, he was made Commissioner for the Peace in Gloucestershire and Derbyshire. William died suddenly in the winter of 1565, in the company of his brother Edward, who had been visiting him. He was buried at the Church of Great St Helen's at Bishopsgate
