= George Talbot, 6th Earl of Shrewsbury =

English magnate

George Talbot
- 6th Earl of Shrewsbury
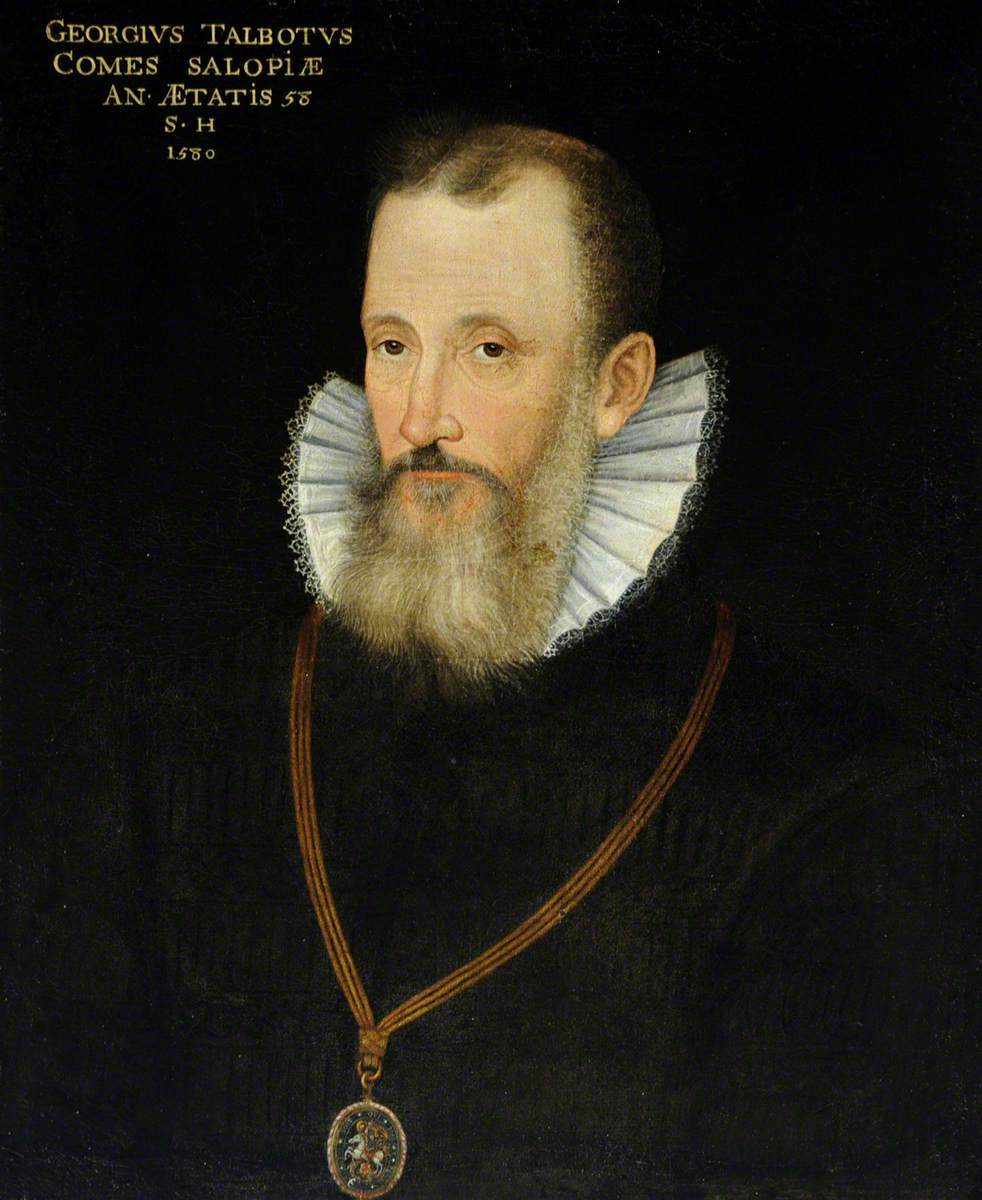
- Born: about 1522 or 1528
- Died: 18 November 1590
- Buried: Sheffield Cathedral
- Spouses: Lady Gertrude Manners; Elizabeth Hardwick
- Issue: Lord Francis Talbot; Gilbert Talbot, 7th Earl of Shrewsbury; Edward Talbot, 8th Earl of Shrewsbury; Catherine Talbot; Mary Talbot; Grace Talbot
- Father: Francis Talbot, 5th Earl of Shrewsbury
- Mother: Mary Dacre

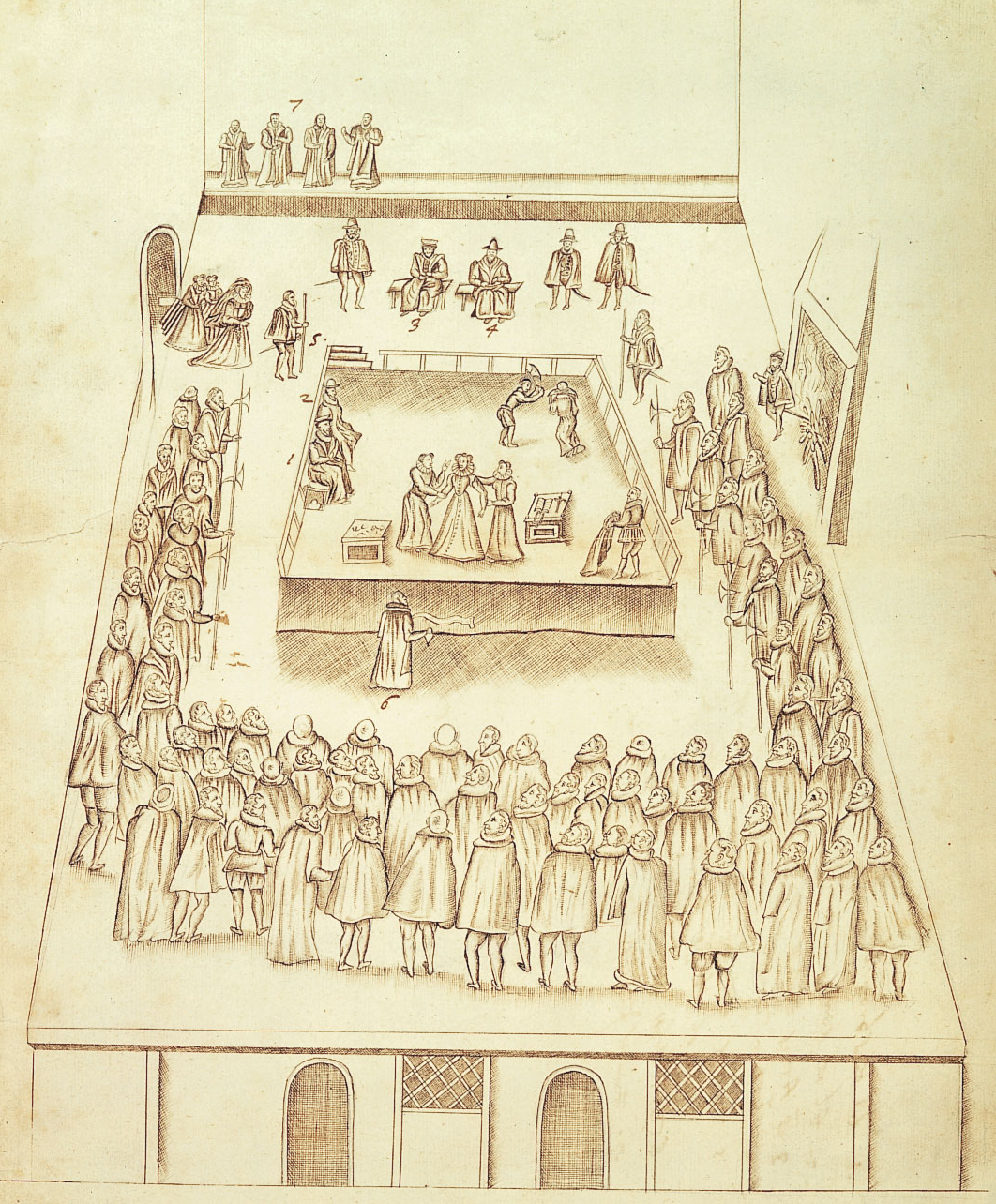
The execution of Mary, Queen of Scots at Fotheringhay Castle on 8 February 1587, drawn by Robert Beale, Clerk of the Privy Council, an eyewitness. The official witnesses, George Talbot, 6th Earl of Shrewsbury and Henry Grey, 6th Earl of Kent are seated on the scaffold at left, identified as numbers 1 and 2. Sir Amias Paulet, Mary's gaoler, is identified as 3, top, seated left below dais

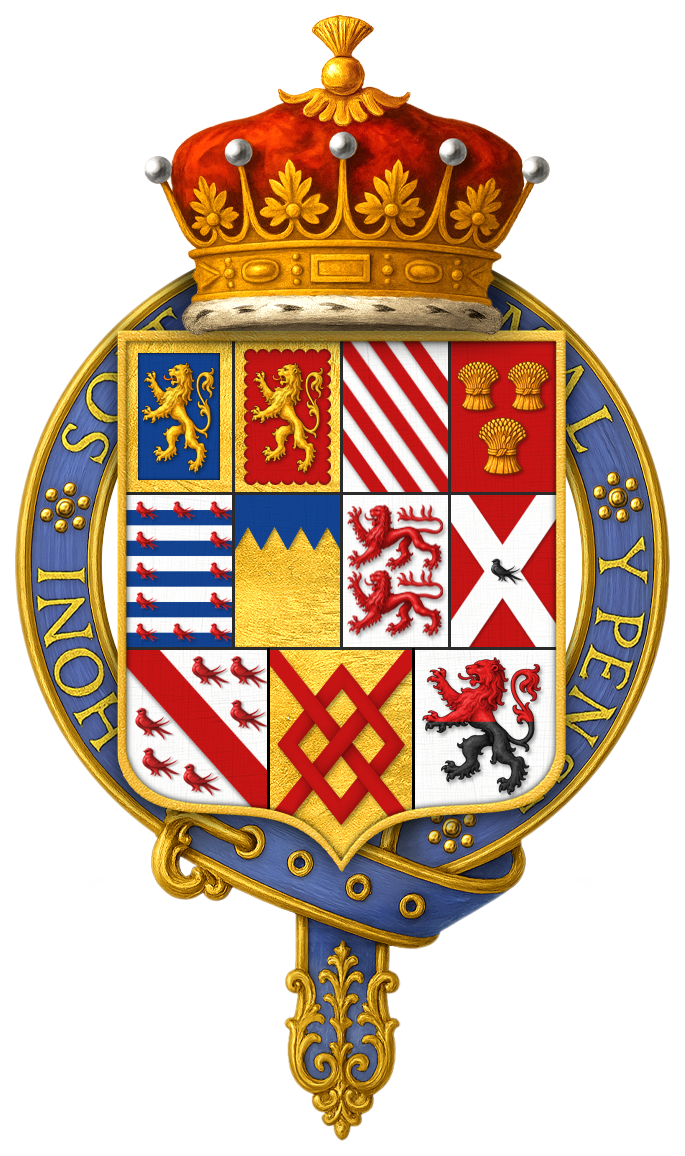
Quartered arms of George Talbot, KG, 6th Earl of Shrewsbury

Arms of Talbot: Gules, a lion rampant or a bordure engrailed of the last

George Talbot, 6th Earl of Shrewsbury, 6th Earl of Waterford, 12th Baron Talbot, KG, Earl Marshal (c. 1522/1528 – 18 November 1590) was an English magnate and military commander. He also held the subsidiary titles of 15th Baron Strange of Blackmere and 11th Baron Furnivall. He was best known for his tenure as keeper of Mary, Queen of Scots between 1568 and 1585, his marriage to his second wife Elizabeth Talbot (Bess of Hardwick), as well as his surviving collection of written work.

== Life and career ==
Talbot was the only son of Francis Talbot, 5th Earl of Shrewsbury and Mary Dacre. In early life he saw active military service, when he took part in the invasion of Scotland under the Protector Somerset. He was sent by his father in October 1557 to the relief of Thomas Percy, 7th Earl of Northumberland pent up in Alnwick Castle. He then remained for some months in service on the border, with five hundred horsemen under his command.

In 1560, he inherited the Earldom of Shrewsbury, the Barony of Furnivall and the position of Justice in Eyre, which had been his father's. He also took over his father's position of Chamberlain of the Exchequer. One year later, he was created a Knight of the Garter.

Shrewsbury was selected as the keeper of Mary, Queen of Scots, who was imprisoned by Queen Elizabeth I in 1568 after she had escaped to England from Scotland following the disastrous Battle of Langside. Shrewsbury received his ward at Tutbury Castle on 2 February 1569, but in June he removed to Wingfield Manor, whereupon a rescue was attempted by Leonard Dacre. The Earl had several houses and castles in the interior of the kingdom, in any of which Mary might be kept with little danger. In September the household was back again at Tutbury, where an additional guard or spy, temporarily joined the family in the person of Henry Hastings, 3rd Earl of Huntingdon. In November took place the Northern Rebellion, with the revolt of the Earls of Northumberland and Westmorland, who planned to march on Tutbury. Mary was for the time being moved to Coventry, and did not return until the following January.

In May 1570 Shrewsbury conducted her to Chatsworth, where he foiled another cabal aiming for her release. Cecil and Mildmay visited Chatsworth in October, and agreed on Mary's removal to Sheffield Castle (Shrewsbury's principal seat), which took place shortly afterwards. At Sheffield, apart from occasional visits to the baths at Buxton, to Chatsworth, or to the old Hardwick Hall, she remained under Shrewsbury's guardianship for the next fourteen years. During the winter of 1571–72 the earl was in London, the queen during his absence being left in charge of Sir Ralph Sadler. Meanwhile, in 1571, Lord Shrewsbury was appointed Lord High Steward (the premier Great Office of State) for the trial of Thomas Howard, 4th Duke of Norfolk (regarding the Ridolfi plot). Finally, in 1572, Lord Shrewsbury was appointed Earl Marshal, a position that he held (along with the aforementioned position of Justice in Eyre) until his death in 1590.

After the conviction of Mary for her role in the Babington Plot, Shrewsbury participated in her trial and was one of the official witnesses to her execution at Fotheringhay Castle on 8 February 1587.

== Personal life, illness and death ==
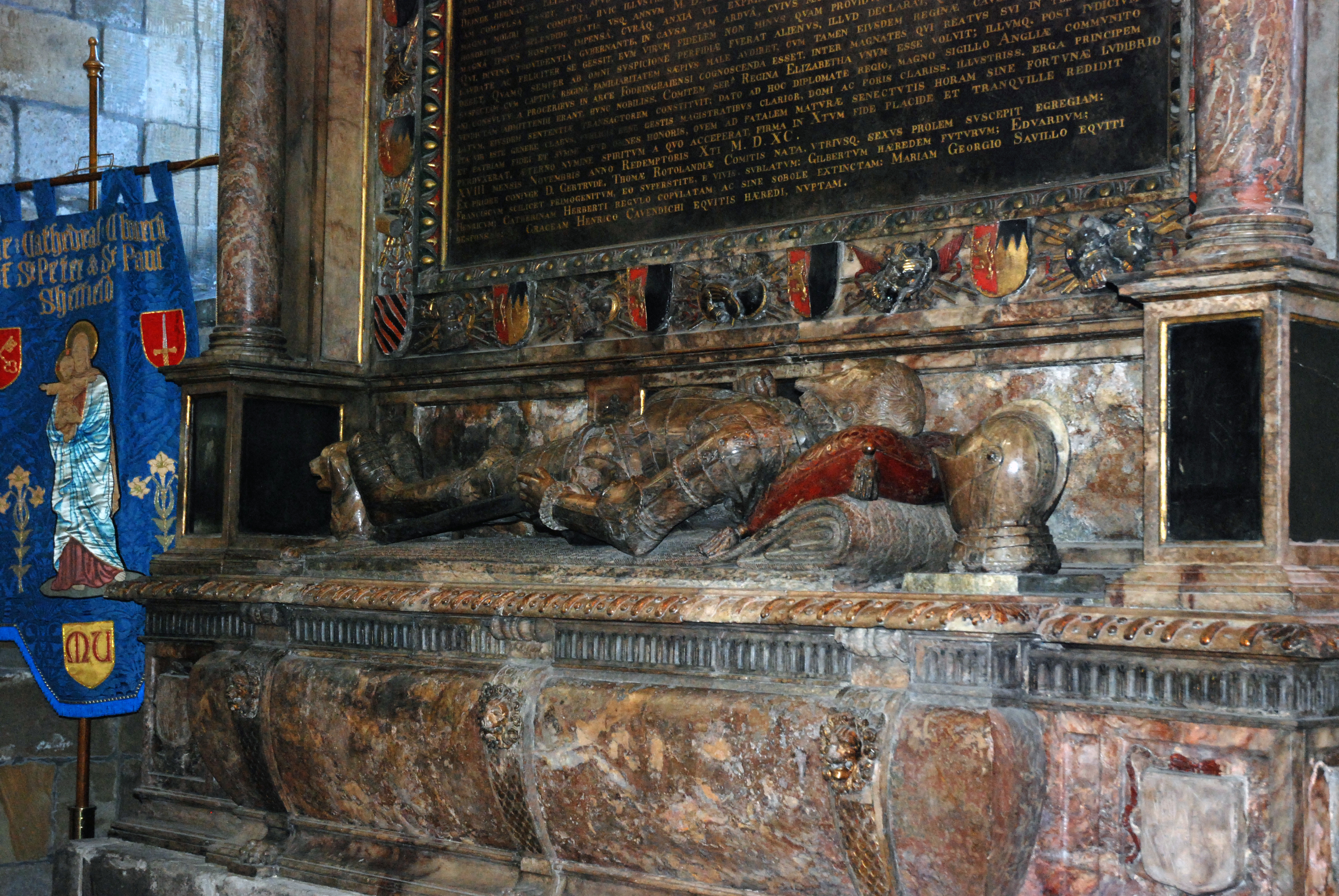
Monument with effigy of George Talbot, 6th Earl of Shrewsbury, Sheffield Cathedral

Upon the death of his first wife, Gertrude Manners, Shrewsbury was immediately taken by Bess of Hardwick. In early 1568 he married her in a double wedding with their two eldest children from previous marriages. Elizabeth Shrewsbury, "Bess," later commemorated her initials in magnificent style: her house at Hardwick, built 1590-97, is topped with a balustrade within which the scrolling letters ES appear four times.

He sent a servant, Ralph Barber, on a shopping trip to Rouen in 1575. Barber bought wine, vinegar, damask and diaper linen for napkins, silk, canvas, caged live quails, and sugar confitures, which he delivered to the earl in London. Shrewsbury built a new house in London, raising speculation that Mary, Queen of Scots, might be brought there.

Queen Elizabeth had imposed the responsible task of guarding Mary on Shrewsbury, and did not allow him to resign the charge for over 15 years. For this and other reasons (such as disputes over property distribution) his marriage with Bess of Hardwick, while initially successful, became rocky, and began to deteriorate around 1583, as detailed by surviving letters between the two. Slowly but increasingly declining health (rheumatism) caused chronic pain, and money issues that inevitably came about during his time as keeper of the Queen of Scots, made him additionally caustic. Elizabeth attempted to reconcile Shrewsbury and Hardwick between 1586 and 1589; however, while the latter was in support of this, Shrewsbury seems to have remained indignant and spent his final years without her, instead seeking the comfort of Eleanor Britton, one of his servants.

George Talbot, 6th Earl of Shrewsbury died on 18 November 1590, survived by his wife Bess of Hardwick. He was buried in the Shrewsbury chapel at Sheffield Parish Church (now Sheffield Cathedral), where a large monument erected to him remains.

== Marriages and children ==
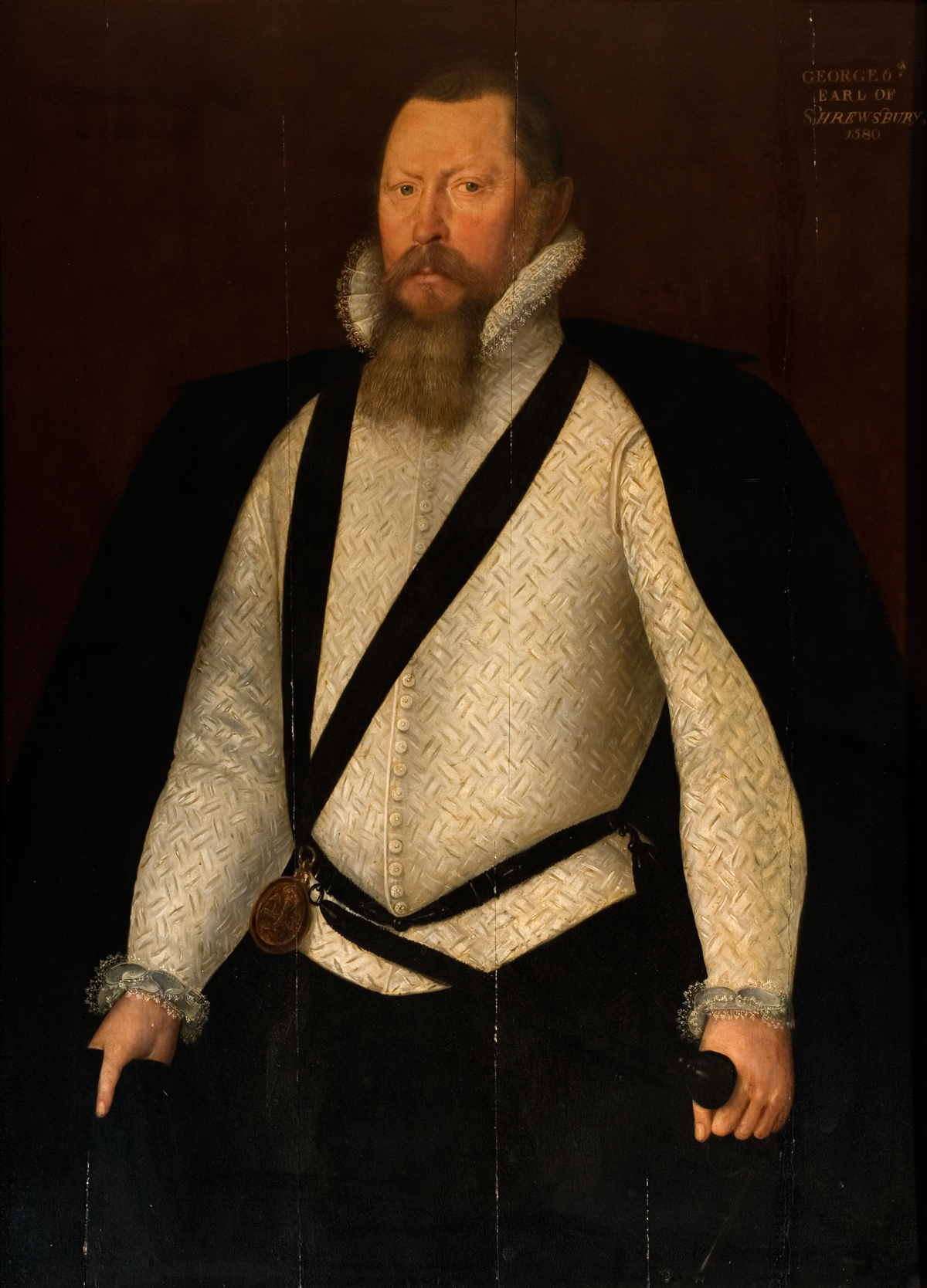
1580 portrait of George Talbot, 6th Earl of Shrewsbury

He married twice:

- Firstly to Gertrude Manners, a daughter of Thomas Manners, 1st Earl of Rutland. Their children included:
  - Francis, Lord Talbot, eldest son and heir apparent, who predeceased his father, having married, in 1563, Lady Anne Herbert, the only daughter of William Herbert, 1st Earl of Pembroke and Anne Parr, sister to the late Queen Catherine Parr. He was known as "Lord Talbot", a courtesy title, being one of his father's lesser titles.
  - Gilbert Talbot, 7th Earl of Shrewsbury, second but eldest surviving son and heir.
  - Henry Talbot (1562–1596), who married Elizabeth Rayner (1556–1612). Amongst his daughters were Gertrude Talbot, wife of Robert Pierrepont, 1st Earl of Kingston-upon-Hull, and Mary Talbot (1594–1676), who married firstly her step-brother Thomas Holcroft (1596 – c. 1626) of Vale Royale, and secondly (in 1628) Sir William Airmine (or Armyne), 1st Baronet (1593–1651) of Osgodby, Lincolnshire. Elizabeth Rayner survived her husband and in 1595 remarried to Thomas Holcroft, son of another Thomas Holcroft.
  - Edward Talbot, 8th Earl of Shrewsbury (1552–1616), who succeeded his elder brother in the earldom.
  - Catherine Talbot, who in 1563 married Henry, Lord Herbert, afterwards 2nd Earl of Pembroke. Queen Elizabeth gave her many tokens of friendship.
  - Mary Talbot, who married Sir George Savile, 1st Baronet of Barrowby, Lincolnshire;
  - Grace Talbot, who married her step-brother Henry Cavendish (1550–1616), son and heir of Sir William Cavendish of Chatsworth in Derbyshire by his wife Elizabeth Hardwick.
- Secondly he married Elizabeth Hardwick (c. 1527 – 1608), (Bess of Hardwick), of Hardwick Hall in Derbyshire, widow of Sir William Cavendish of Chatsworth in Derbyshire; without progeny.

== Letters and papers ==
Shrewsbury left behind much written documentation including letters and papers. Generally, these cover the time between his succession to the earlship in 1560 and his death. Many of Shrewsbury's surviving papers found their way in the College of Arms and were re-united with others in the Lambeth Palace library in 1983 as the "Shrewsbury-Talbot papers". This historical resource was first published in 1791 by Edmund Lodge, and all the letters were more recently summarized in calendar form.

- Lodge, Edmund, ed., Illustrations of British History, 3 vols., London (1791)
- Lodge, Edmund, ed., Illustrations of British History, 3 vols., Oxford, (1838)
- Bill, E. G. W., ed., Calendar of Shrewsbury papers in the Lambeth Palace Library, Derbyshire Record Society (1966)
- Batho, G. R., ed., Calendar of the Shrewsbury and Talbot manuscripts in the College of Arms, HMC (1971)

In addition to these, letters by Talbot to and from his second wife Bess of Hardwick survive in the University of Glasgow's collection. These have been digitized by the university and are available online.

Despite the wealth of surviving written material Shrewsbury's handwriting is notorious among scholars for its illegibility. For example, an 1875 article in the Sheffield Independent Press declared his handwriting "the despair of all transcribers" (a view still held by scholars and paleographers), which is worsened by the non-standard spelling of the time. It is accepted that Shrewsbury suffered from rheumatism ("gout") in his hand. Shrewsbury himself once referred to his pen-hand as "my evil favoured writing".

== In fiction ==
George Talbot is a primary character in the historical fiction novels The Captive Queen of Scots by Jean Plaidy and The Other Queen by Philippa Gregory. He is also a recurring character in Friedrich Schiller's play Mary Stuart (as Lord Shrewsbury) and in the tragic opera inspired by it, Gaetano Donizetti's Maria Stuarda (as Giorgo Talbot). He appears as a character in the 1972 BBC television drama series Mistress of Hardwick.

== Notes ==
Legal offices
Preceded by The Earl of Shrewsbury	Justice in Eyre north of the Trent; 1560–1590	Succeeded by The Earl of Shrewsbury
Political offices
Preceded by The Earl of Shrewsbury	Lord High Steward of Ireland; 1560–1590	Succeeded by The Earl of Shrewsbury
Preceded by The Duke of Norfolk	Earl Marshal; 1572–1590	Succeeded by In commission
Preceded by Unknown	Lord Lieutenant of Derbyshire; 1585–1590	Succeeded by The Earl of Shrewsbury
Unknown	Lord Lieutenant of Staffordshire; 1585–1590	Vacant Title next held by The Earl of Essex
Preceded by The Earl of Rutland	Lord Lieutenant of Nottinghamshire; 1588–1590	Vacant Title next held by The Earl of Newcastle-upon-Tyne
Peerage of England
Preceded by Francis Talbot	Earl of Shrewsbury; 1560–1590	Succeeded by Gilbert Talbot
Preceded by Francis Talbot	Baron Talbot (descended by acceleration); 1560–1590	Succeeded by Gilbert Talbot
Peerage of Ireland
Preceded by Francis Talbot	Earl of Waterford; 1560–1590	Succeeded by Gilbert Talbot
