= Elizabeth Grey, Countess of Kent =

English medical recipe collector (1582–1651)

Elizabeth Grey
- Countess of Kent
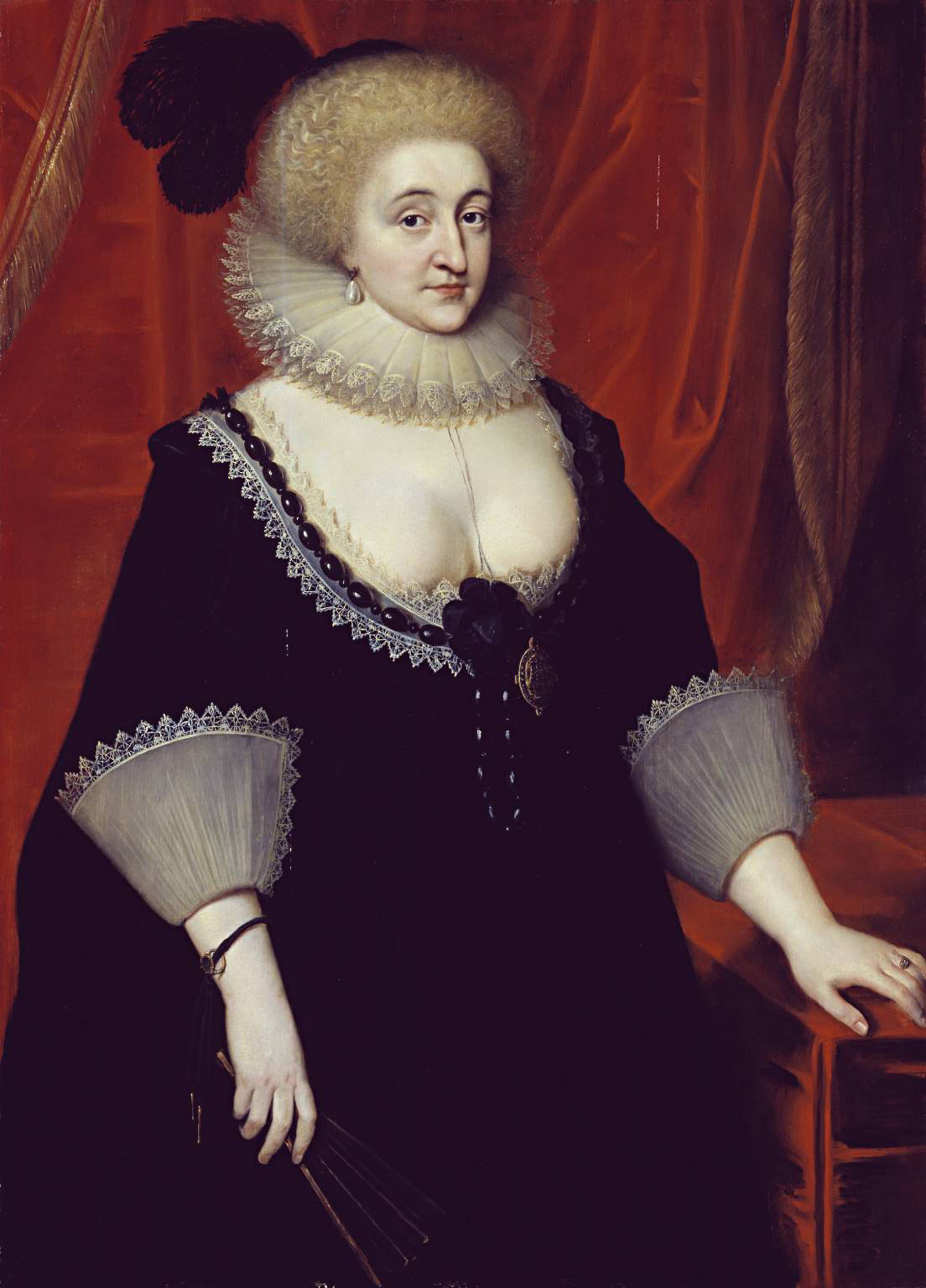
- Portrait of Elizabeth Grey by Paul Van Somer, ca. 1619
- Born: 1582
- Died: 7 December 1651; Friary House, Whitefriars, London
- Spouses: Henry Grey, 8th Earl of Kent
- Father: Gilbert Talbot, 7th Earl of Shrewsbury
- Mother: Mary Cavendish

Elizabeth Grey, Countess of Kent (née Lady Elizabeth Talbot) (1582 – 7 December 1651) was a medical recipe collector, and the wife of Henry Grey, 8th Earl of Kent.

== Biography ==
She was a daughter of Gilbert Talbot, 7th Earl of Shrewsbury and Mary Cavendish. Elizabeth Talbot was described in a letter of November 1590, after she had been taken to see Queen Elizabeth I:

If I should write how much her Majesty this day did make of the little lady your daughter, with often kissing (which her Majesty seldom uses to any) and then amending her dressing with pins, and still carrying her with her Majesty in her own barge, and so into the privy lodgings, and so homeward from the running, you would scarce believe me: Her Majesty said (as true it is) that she is very like my Lady her grandmother: she behaved herself with such modesty as I pray she may possess at 20 years old.

She was appointed a maid of honour to Elizabeth I in June 1600.

She married Grey on 16 November 1601, at St Martin-in-the-Fields. They lived at Wrest Park, Bedfordshire, where she managed the large household. They had no children, and the Earl died in 1639. Afterwards she may have married the writer, John Selden, who had worked for the Earl and to whom she left most of her property.

She was a favourite attendant of Anne of Denmark, queen consort of James VI and I. As her husband was Baron Grey of Ruthin, she was named as "Lady Ruthin" in lists of Anne of Denmark's household. She is sometimes confused with Barbara Ruthven, the queen's favourite in Scotland in the 1590s. Lady Ruthin was a contact at court for Lady Anne Clifford, and took her gifts to Anne of Denmark, including a white satin gown embroidered with pearls and coloured silks.

In 1609, an Italian poet, Antimo Galli, published Rime di Antimo Galli which includes stanzas describing the guests and participants in The Masque of Beauty. He dedicated his book to Lady Grey. In 1610 she danced in the court masque Tethys' Festival as the "Nymph of Medway". In 1616 the Venetian ambassador Antonio Foscarini gave the Queen a necklace but Lady Grey returned it to him. It was said she replaced Jean Drummond as the queen's personal servant in October 1617. Her portrait by Paul van Somer includes a jewelled tablet or locket with the Queen's monogram.

The queen's brother, Christian IV of Denmark wrote to her in 1619, asking her to take care to avert the Queen's melancholy. After Anne of Denmark's death, Christian IV wrote to her, thanking her for her service, and she replied from Somerset House in French.

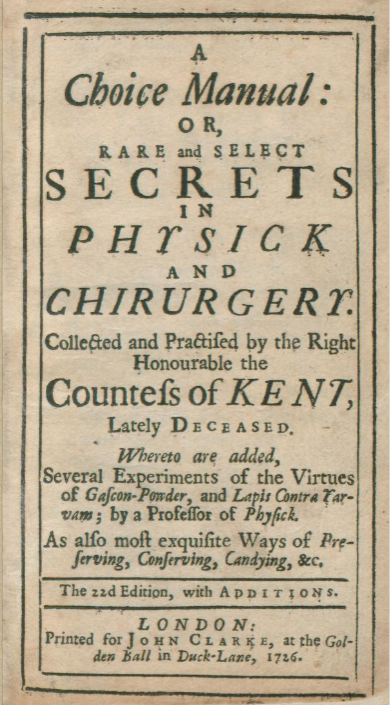
Title page for 22nd edition, (1726)

== Recipe books ==
After her death, her collection of medical recipes was published in 1653 by "W. J., Gent[leman]", originally as A Choice Manual, or Rare Secrets in Physick and Chirurgery Collected and Practised by the Right Honourable the Countess of Kent, lately deceased. Later editions of the book added the subtitle Whereto are added several experiments of the vertue of Gascon powder, and lapis contra yarvam by a professor of physick. As also most exquisite ways of preserving, conserving, candying &c.. The book was popular, going through twenty-two editions. Some of the recipes reflect the influence of English Paracelsianism. Medical recipes were an interest she shared with her younger sister, Alethea Howard, Countess of Arundel.

A cookbook published in the same year by "W. J., Gent[leman]", titled A True Gentlewoman's Delight, is sometimes said to be her personal recipe collection, although there is speculation that it was written by her chef Robert May, or by the publisher himself.
