= Record =

A record, recording or records may refer to:

== An item or collection of data ==
=== Computing ===
- Record (computer science), a data structure
  - Record, or row (database), a set of fields in a database related to one entity
  - Boot sector or boot record, record used to start an operating system
  - Storage record, a basic input/output structure

=== Documents ===
- Record, a document for administrative use
  - Business record, of economic transactions
  - Criminal record, a list of a person's criminal convictions
  - Docket (court), the summary of proceedings in a court (US)
  - Medical record, of a person's medical history and treatments
  - Minutes, a summary of the proceedings at a meeting
  - Public records, information that has been filed or recorded by public agencies
  - Recording (real estate), the act of documenting real estate transactions
  - Service record, usually associated with military service
  - Transcript (law), a verbatim record of some proceedings, in particular a court transcript is a record of a law court case or similar procedure
- Archaeological record, the body of archaeological evidence
- Recorded history, a record of events that has been made for thousands of years in one form or another, e.g., oral, photographic, or written

=== Images ===
- Moving pictures, film, video, and television recordings
- Photography, photographic record
- Video recording, of both images and sounds

=== Sound ===
- Sound recording and reproduction
  - Analogue recording
  - Digital recording
  - Phonograph record, a mechanical analog audio storage medium
  - Cylinder record
  - Music album
  - A recording of a song

== Arts, entertainment, and media ==
=== Music ===
- Record (Tracey Thorn album)
- Records (album), a 1982 album by rock band Foreigner
- Records (song), a 2022 song by Weezer

=== Periodicals ===
- Record (magazine), the official church paper of the South Pacific Division of Seventh-day Adventists
- Record (Portuguese newspaper), a Portuguese daily sports newspaper
- Récord (Mexican newspaper), a Mexican daily sports newspaper

=== Television ===
- Grupo Record, a Brazilian media conglomerate
  - Record (TV network), a Brazilian TV network located in São Paulo
  - Record News, a Brazilian news channel owned by Grupo Record

== Sports and skills ==
- FC Rekord Aleksandrov, a former Russian association football club
- Rekord Irkutsk, a Russian bandy club
- Rekord Stadium, a sports arena in Irkutsk, Russia
- Win–loss record (pitching), the number of wins and losses a baseball pitcher has accumulated

Some sports clubs take their name from this word:

- World record, an unsurpassed accomplishment or statistic on world level

== Other uses ==
- Record (agricultural vehicles), a Greek vehicle manufacturer
- Record (surname)
- Record (software), a music recording program
- Strengthening the reporting of observational studies in epidemiology or RECORD, statement (The REporting of Studies Conducted Using Observational Routinely-Collected Health Data)

== See also ==
- The Record (disambiguation)
- For the Record (disambiguation)
- Off the record (disambiguation)
- On Record (disambiguation)
- On the Record (disambiguation)
- Reckord, a surname
- Recorder (disambiguation)
