= For the Record =

For the Record may refer to:

== Music ==
- For the Record (Alabama album), a 1998 album
- For the Record (Torae album), a 2011 album
- For the Record: The First 10 Years, a 1984 compilation album by David Allan Coe

== Film and television ==
- For the Record (film), a 2023 documentary film
- Britney: For the Record, a 2008 television film
- For the Record (American TV series), a television series by Blaze Media
- For the Record (Canadian TV series), a Canadian television drama series
- For the Record (web series), a Canadian web series
- For the Record with Greta, an American news series
- "For the Record", a season 3 episode of The Casagrandes

== Other uses ==
- For the Record (book), a political memoir by David Cameron
- YouTube Rewind 2019: For the Record
- The title of the campaign story mode in the 2009 video game Call of Duty: Modern Warfare 2

== See also ==
- Four the Record, an album by Miranda Lambert
- Off the Record (disambiguation)
- On Record (disambiguation)
- On the Record (disambiguation)
- Record (disambiguation)
