= Prodigy house =

Architectural term for large and showy Tudor and Jacobean houses, typically in England

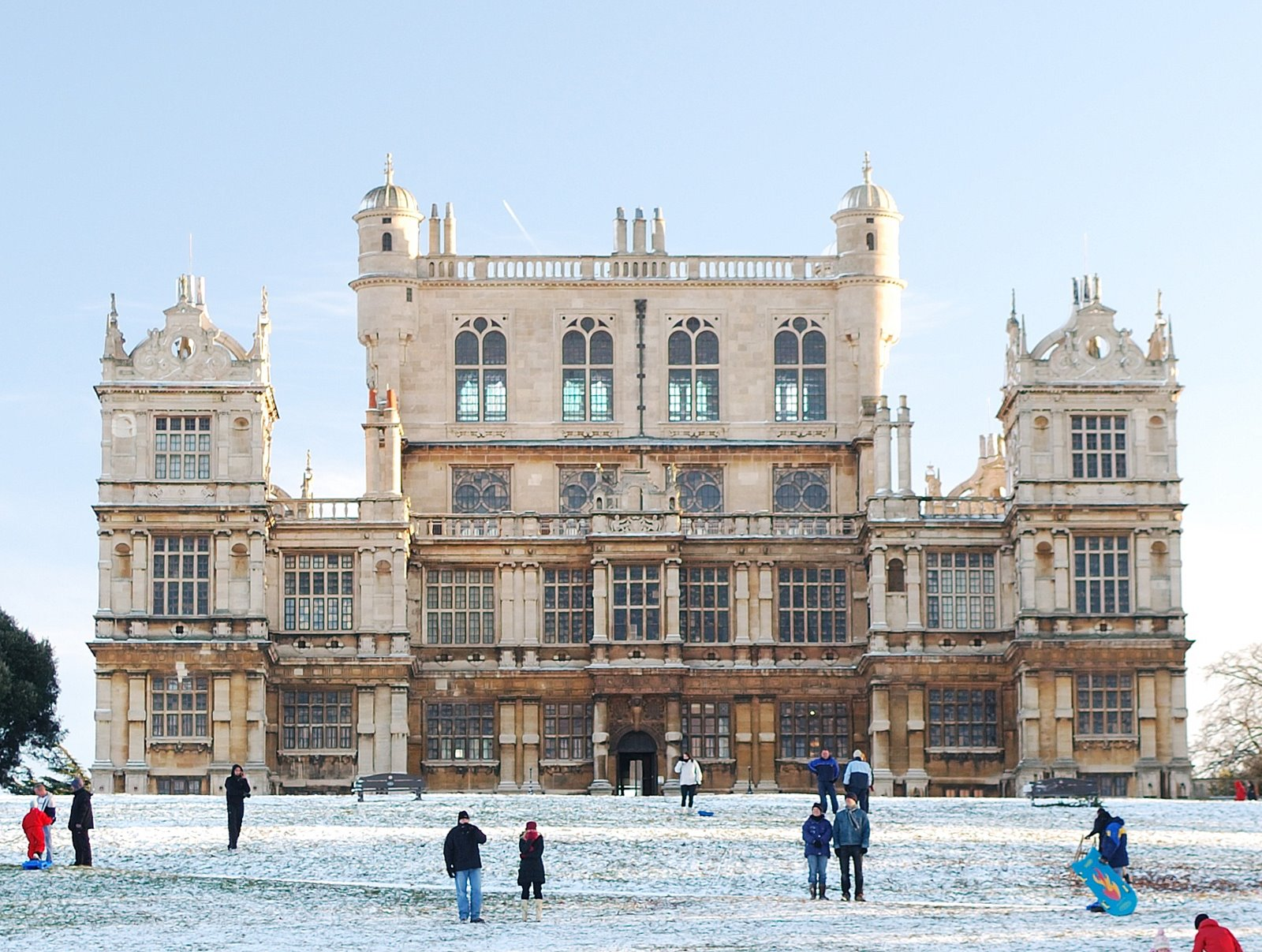
Wollaton Hall, Nottingham

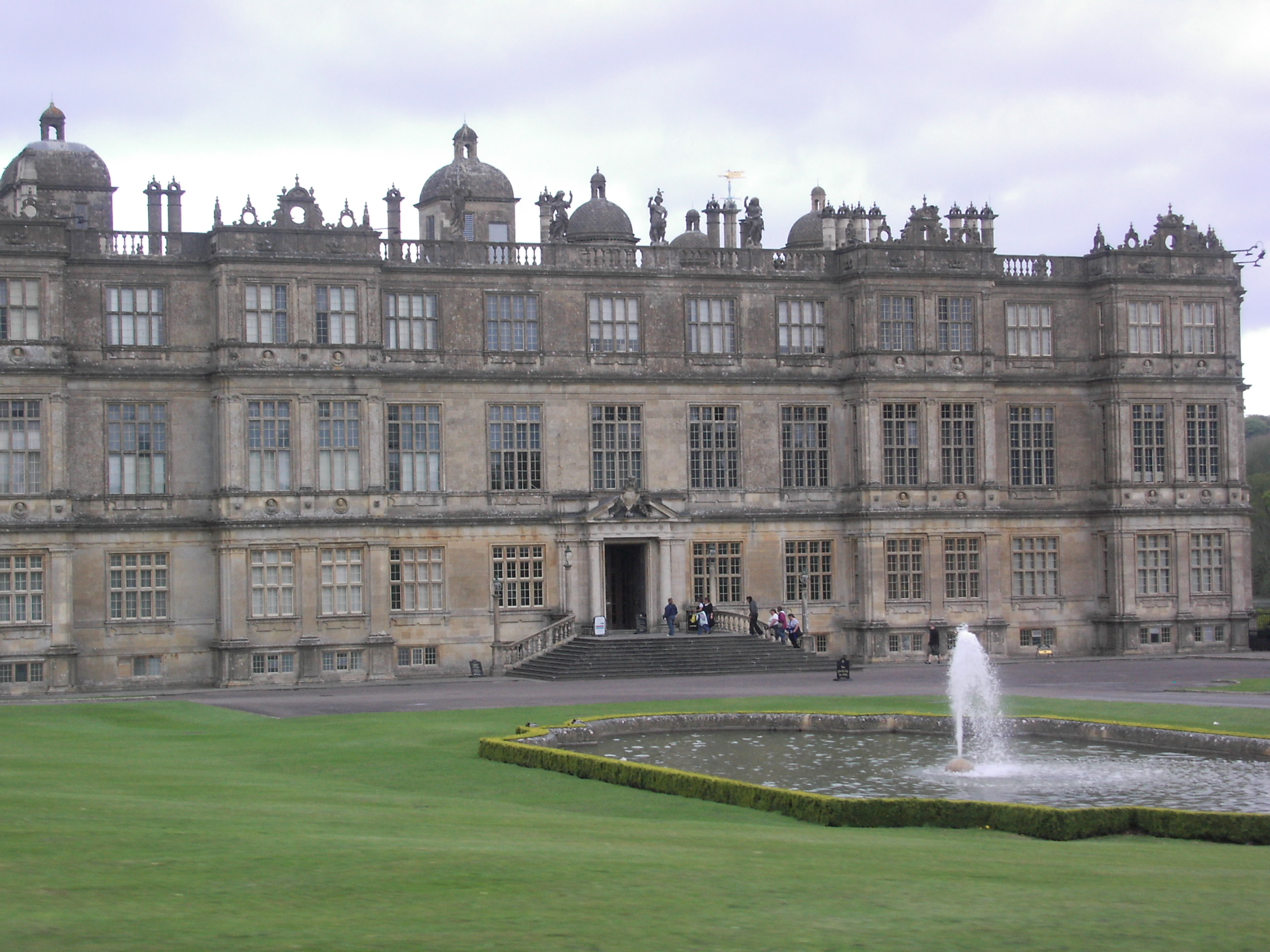
Longleat House, Wiltshire

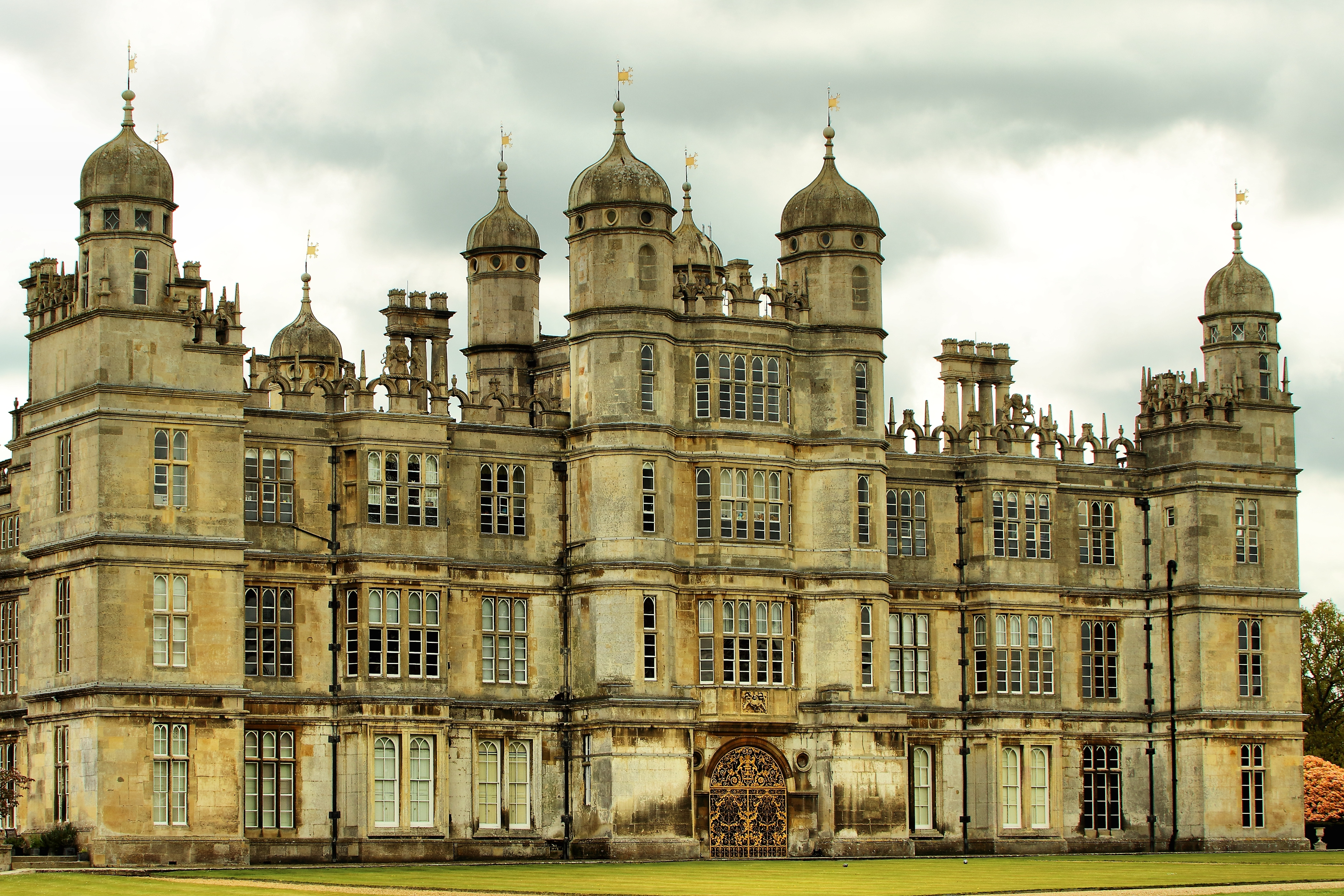
Burghley House, Cambridgeshire

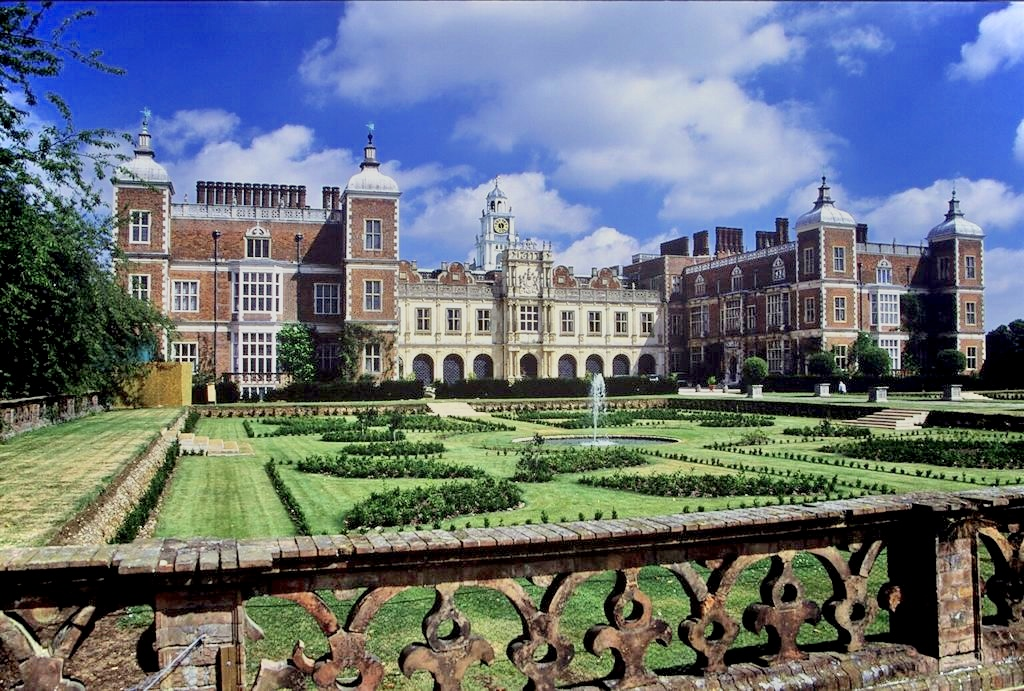
Hatfield House, Hertfordshire

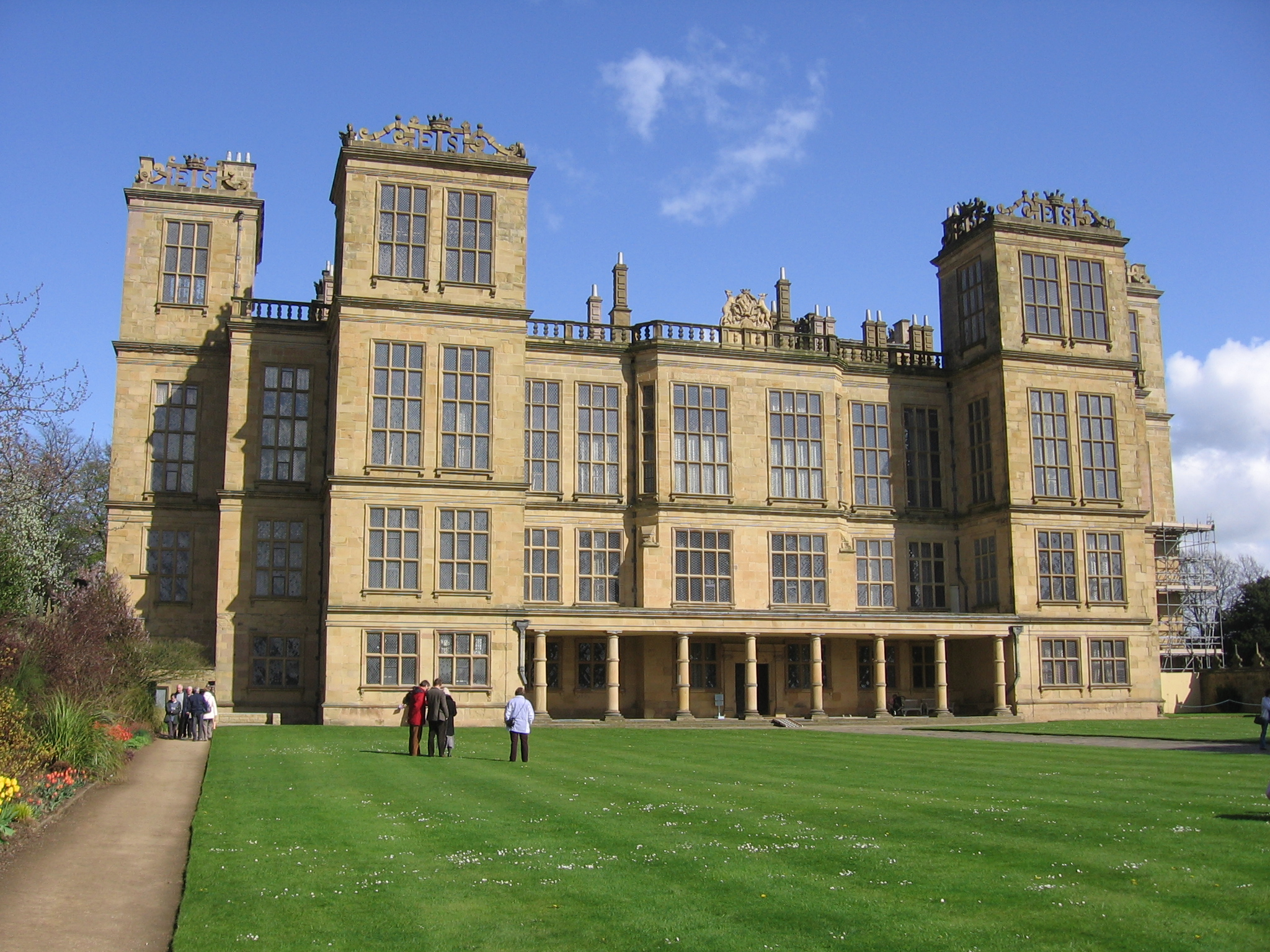
Hardwick Hall, Derbyshire, built 1590–97

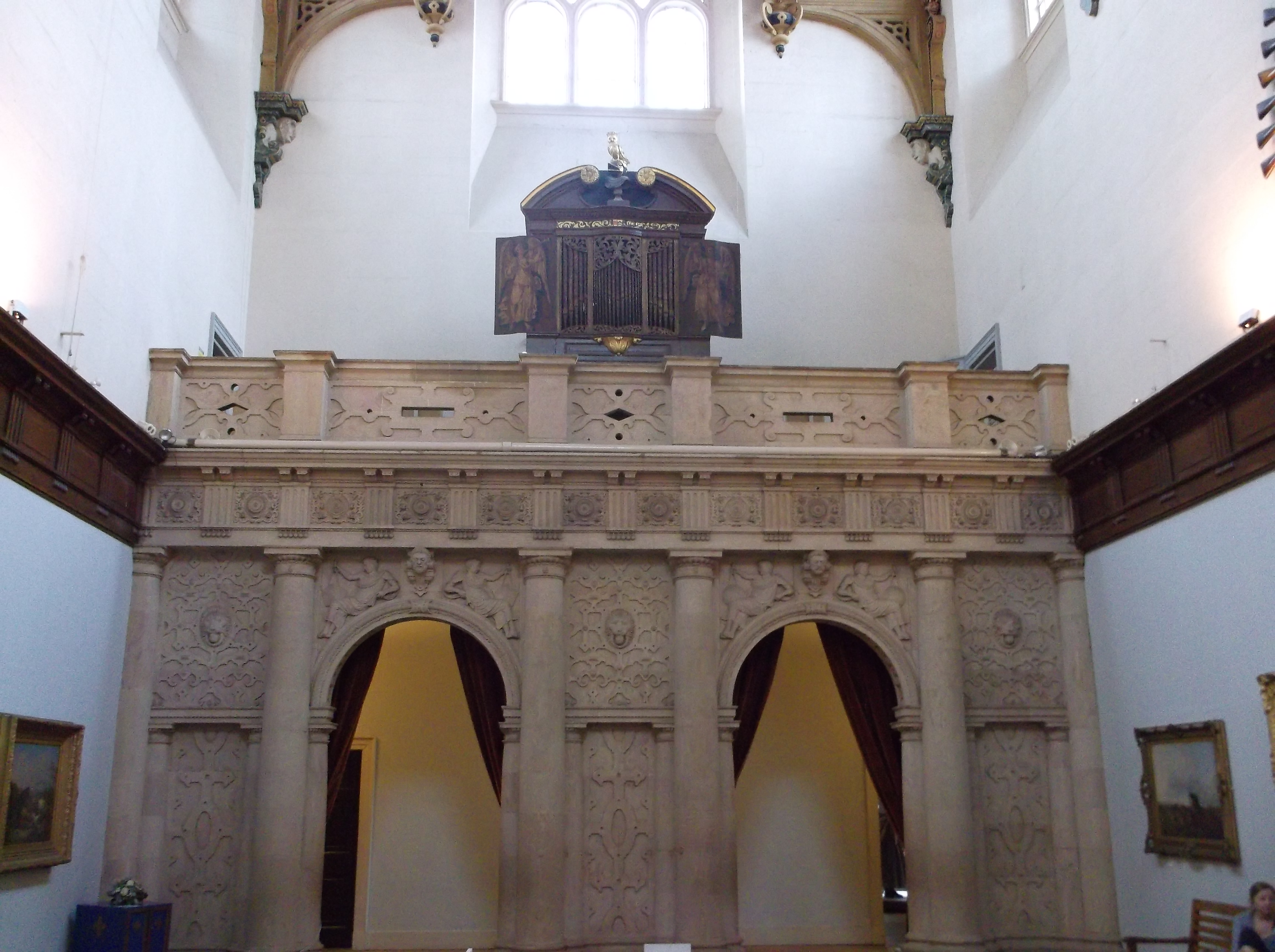
The hall screen at Wollaton Hall

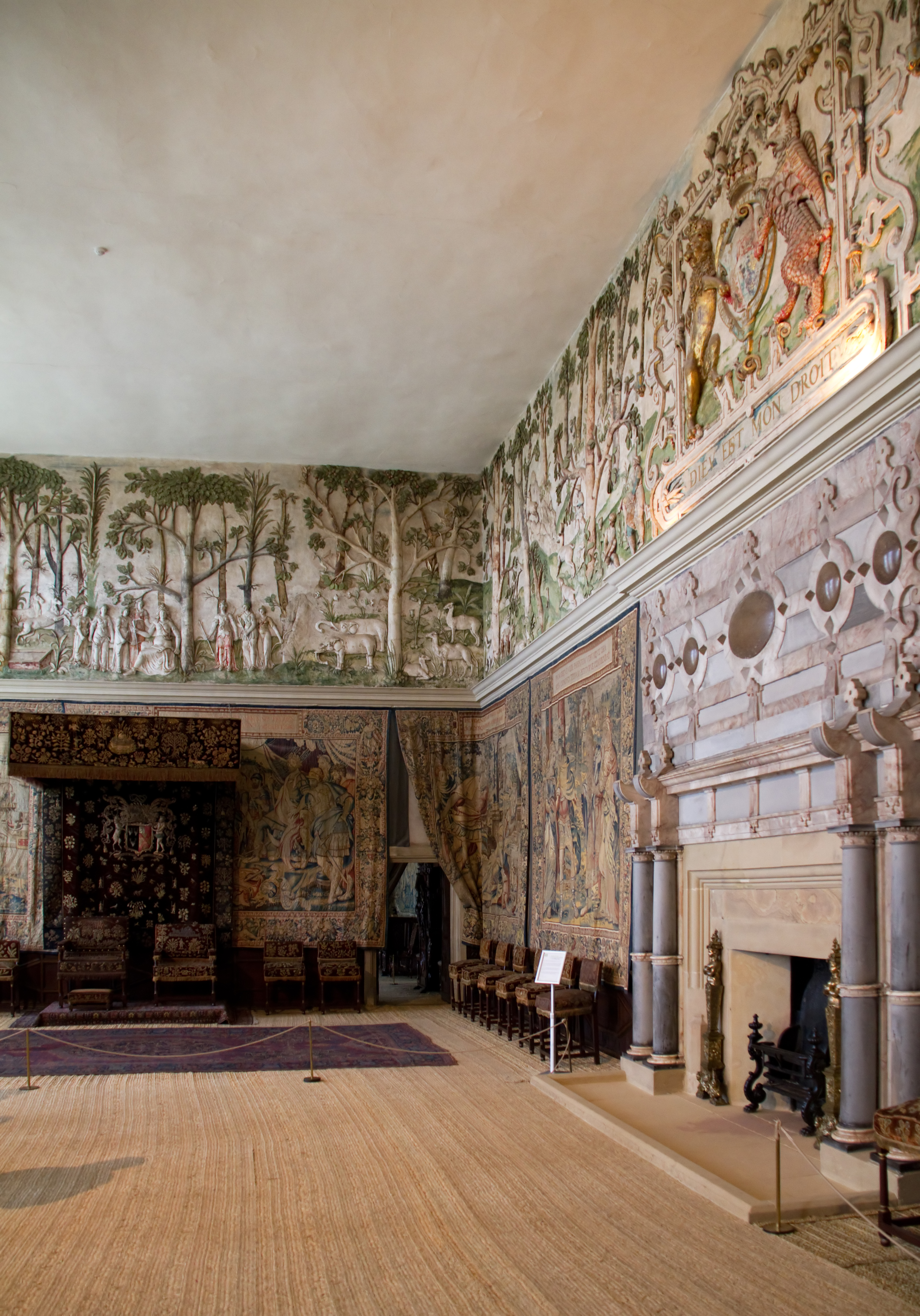
The Great High Chamber on the top floor of Hardwick Hall

Prodigy houses are large and showy English country houses built by courtiers and other wealthy families, either "noble palaces of an awesome scale" or "proud, ambitious heaps" according to taste. The prodigy houses stretch over the periods of Tudor, Elizabethan, and Jacobean architecture, though the term may be restricted to a core period of roughly 1570 to 1620. Many of the grandest were built with a view to housing Elizabeth I and her large retinue as they made their annual royal progress around her realm. Many are therefore close to major roads, often in the English Midlands.

The term originates with the architectural historian Sir John Summerson, and has been generally adopted. He called them, "the most daring of all English buildings." The houses fall within the broad style of Renaissance architecture, but represent a distinctive English take on the style, mainly reliant on books for their knowledge of developments on the Continent. Andrea Palladio (1508–1580) was already dead before the prodigy houses reached their peak, but his more restrained classical style did not reach England until the work of Inigo Jones in the 1620s, and French and Flemish Northern Mannerist decoration was more influential than Italian.

Elizabeth I travelled through southern England in annual summer "progresses", staying at the houses of wealthy courtiers. On these trips she went as far north as Coventry, and she planned a trip to Shrewsbury (where she was to watch plays staged by Thomas Ashton), but this leg was cancelled because of illness.

The hosts were expected to house the monarch in style, and provide sufficient accommodation for about 150 travelling members of the court, for whom temporary buildings might need to be erected. Elizabeth was not slow to complain if she felt her accommodation had not been appropriate, and did so even about two of the largest prodigy houses, Theobalds House and Old Gorhambury House (the former destroyed, the latter ruined).

Partly as a result of this imperative, but also general increasing wealth, there was an Elizabethan building boom, with large houses built in the most modern styles by courtiers, wealthy from acquired monastic estates, who wished to display their wealth and status. A characteristic was the large area of glass – a new feature that superseded the need for easily defended external walls and announced the owners' wealth. Hardwick Hall, for example, was proverbially described as "Hardwick Hall, more glass than wall." Many other smaller prodigy houses were built by businessmen and administrators, as well as long-established families of the peerage and gentry. The large Doddington Hall, Lincolnshire, was built between 1593 and 1600 by Robert Smythson for Thomas Tailor, who was the recorder to the Bishop of Lincoln; "Tailor was a lawyer and therefore rich", says Simon Jenkins.

Some recent uses of the term extend the meaning to describe large ostentatious houses in the United States of later periods, such as colonial mansions in Virginia, first so described by the American writer Cary Carson.

== Style ==
In many respects the style of the houses varies greatly, but consistent features are a love of glass, a high elevation, symmetrical exteriors, consistency between all sides of the building, a rather square plan, often with tower pavilions at the corners that rise above the main roofline, and a decorated skyline. Altogether "...a strange amalgam of exuberant pinnacles and turrets, native Gothic mullioned windows, and Renaissance decoration." Many houses stand alone, with stables and other outbuildings at a discreet distance. Glass was then an expensive material, and its use on a large scale a demonstration of wealth. The large windows required mullions, normally in stone even in houses mainly in brick. For the main structure, stone is preferred, often as a facing over brick, but some buildings use mostly brick, for example Hatfield House, following the precedent of Hampton Court Palace and other earlier houses. Though there were often reminiscences of the medieval castle, the houses were exceptionally without defences, compared to contemporary Italian and French equivalents.

To have two internal courtyards, requiring a very large building, was a status symbol, found at Audley End, Blickling Hall, and others. By the end of the Elizabethan period this sprawling style, essentially developing the form of late medieval buildings like Knole in Kent (which has a total of 7 courtyards), and many Oxbridge colleges, was giving way to more compact high-rising structures with a coherent and dramatic structural plan, making the whole form of the building visible from outside the house. Hardwick Hall, Burghley House, and on a smaller scale Wollaton Hall, exemplify this trend. The outer exteriors of the house are more decorated than internal exteriors such as courtyards, the reverse of the usual priority in medieval houses. The common E- and H-shaped plans, and in effect incorporating an imposing gatehouse into the main facade, rather than placing it on the far side of an initial courtyard, increased the visibility of the most grandly decorated parts of the exterior.

The classical orders were often used as decoration, piled up one above the other on the storeys over the main entrance. But, with a few exceptions such as Kirby Hall, columns were restricted to such individual features; in other buildings, such as the Bodleian Library, similar "Towers of the Five Orders" sit at the centre of frankly Gothic facades. At Longleat and Wollaton shallow pilasters are used across the facades. A crib-book, The First and Chief Grounds of Architecture by John Shute (1563) had been commissioned or sponsored by "Protector Somerset", John Dudley, 1st Duke of Northumberland, and is recorded in the libraries of many important clients of buildings, along with Sebastiano Serlio's Architettura, initially in Italian or another language until 1611, when Robert Peake published four of the volumes in English. The heavily illustrated books on ornament by the Netherlander Hans Vredeman de Vries (1560s onwards) and German Wendel Dietterlin (1598) supplied much of the Northern Mannerist decorative detail such as strapwork. It is evident from surviving letters that courtiers took a keen and competitive interest in architectural matters.

== Interiors ==
Inside, most houses still had a large hall in the medieval style, often with a stone or wood screen at one end. But this was only used for eating in by the servants, except on special occasions. The main room for the family to eat and live in was the great chamber, usually on the first floor (above the ground floor), a continuation of late medieval developments. In the 16th century a withdrawing room was usually added between the great chamber and the principal bedroom, as well as the long gallery. The parlour was another name for a more private room, and increasingly there were a number of these in larger houses, where the immediate family would now usually eat, and where they might retreat entirely in cold weather. Although the first modern corridor in England was probably built in this period, in 1579, they remained rare, and houses continued to have most rooms only accessible through other rooms, with the most intimate spaces of the family at the end of a suite.

Staircases became wide and elaborate, and normally made of oak; Burghley and Hardwick are exceptions using stone. The new concept of a large long gallery was an important space, and many houses had spaces for entertaining on the top floor, whether small rooms in towers on the roof, or the very large top-floor rooms at Hardwick and Wollaton. Meanwhile, the servants lived on the ground floor. This might be seen as a lingering memory of the medieval castle, where domestic spaces were often placed high above the soldiery, and viewpoints were highly functional, and is a feature rarely found in subsequent large houses for two centuries or more. At Hardwick the windows increase in size as the storeys rise up, reflecting the increasing status of the rooms. In several houses the mostly flat roof itself was part of the reception spaces, with banqueting houses in the towers that were only accessible from "the leads", and a layout that allowed walking around to admire the views.

== Architects ==
The designers are often unclear, and the leading figures had a background in one of the specialisms of building. Sometimes owners played a part in the detailed design, though the age of the gentleman amateur architect mostly came later. Few original drawings survive, though there are some by the architect-mason Robert Smythson (1535–1614) who was an important figure; many houses at least show his influence. Robert Lyminge was in charge of Hatfield and Blickling. John Thorpe laid the foundation stone of Kirby Hall as a five-year old (his father was chief mason, and children were often asked to perform this ritual) and is associated with Charlton House, Longford Castle, Condover Hall and the original Holland House, and perhaps Rushton Hall and Audley End. The demand for skilled senior builders, able to design and manage projects or parts of them, exceeded supply, and, at least in the largest houses, they appear to have been usually given a great deal of freedom in deciding the actual design by their mainly absentee clients.

== History ==
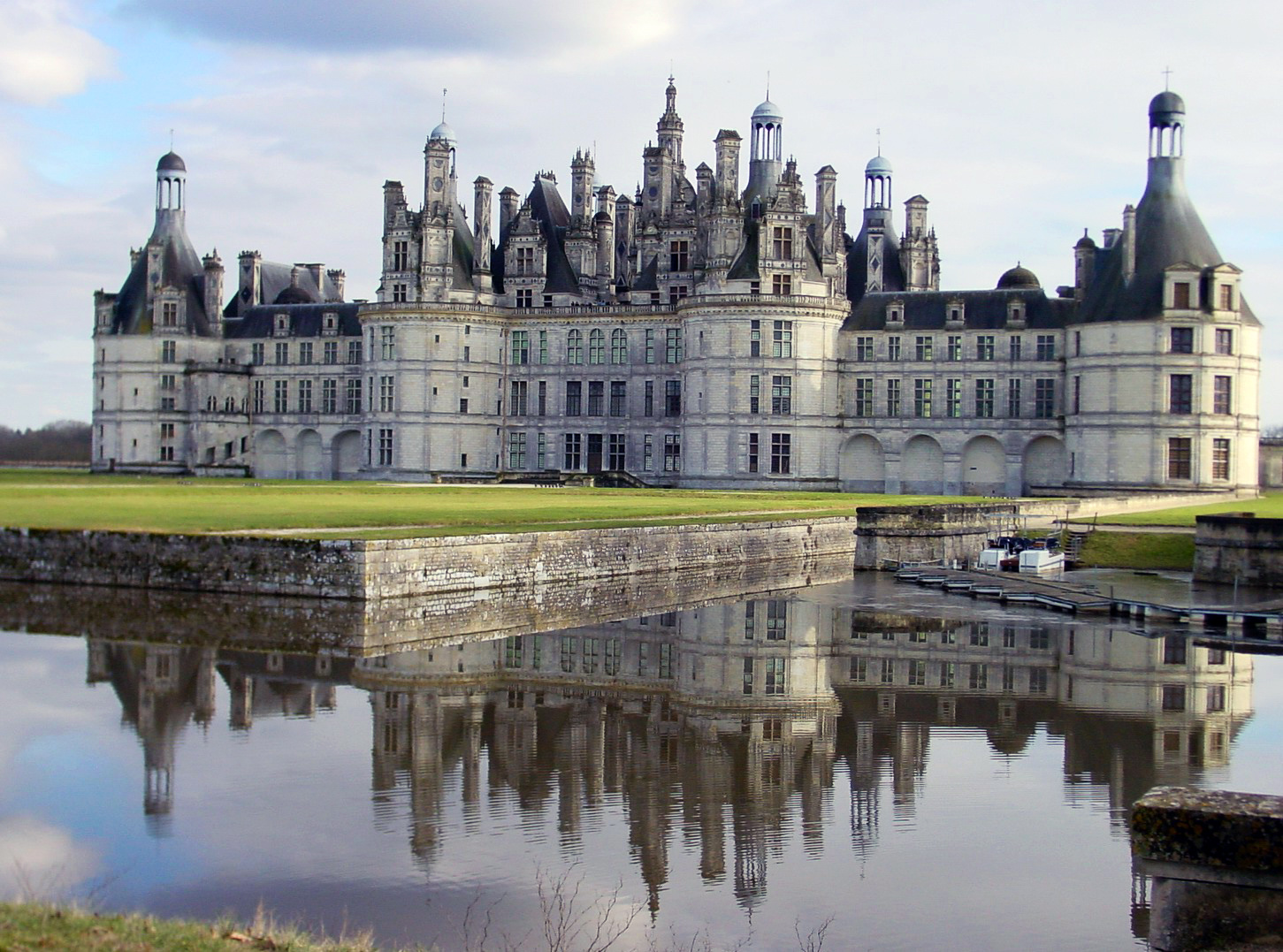
Château de Chambord of François I of France (built 1519–1547)

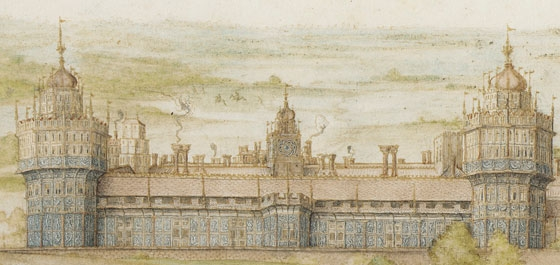
Detail of Joris Hoefnagel's 1568 watercolour of the south front of Nonsuch Palace (demolished)

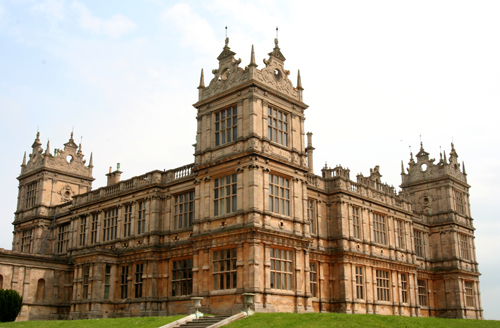
Mentmore Towers, Buckinghamshire, 1852-54

The first "prodigy house" might be said to be Henry VII's Richmond Palace, completed in 1501 but now destroyed, although as a royal palace it does not strictly fit the definition. Hampton Court Palace, built by Cardinal Wolsey but taken over by the king on his fall, is certainly an example. The trend continued through the reigns of Henry VIII, Elizabeth, and into the reign of James I, when it reached its height. Henry was a prolific builder himself, though little of his work survives, but the prudent Elizabeth (like her siblings) built nothing herself, instead encouraging her courtiers to "...build on a scale which in the past would have been seen as a dynastic threat."

Others see the original Somerset House in the Strand, London as the first prodigy house, or at least the first English attempt at a thoroughly and consistently classical style. With some other Châteaux of the Loire Valley, the Château de Chambord of François I of France (built 1519–1547) had many features of the English houses, and certainly influenced Henry VIII's Nonsuch Palace.

Important political families such as the Cecils and Bacons were serial builders of houses. These newly-risen families were typically the most frenetic builders. Sites were chosen for their potential convenience for royal progresses, rather than being the centre of landholdings, which were looked after by agents, or any local political powerbase.

The term prodigy house ceases to be used for houses built after about 1620. Despite some features of more strictly classical houses like Wilton House (rebuilding begun 1630) continuing those of the prodigy house, the term is not used of them. Much later houses like Houghton Hall and Blenheim Palace show a lingering fondness for elements of the 16th-century prodigy style.

In the 19th century Jacobethan revivals began, most spectacularly at Harlaxton Manor, which Anthony Salvin began in 1837. This manages to impart a Baroque swagger to the Northern Mannerist vocabulary. Mentmore Towers, by Joseph Paxton, is an enormous revival of a Smythson-type style, and like Westonbirt House (Lewis Vulliamy, 1860s) and Highclere Castle (by Sir Charles Barry 1839–42, used for filming Downton Abbey), is something of an inflated Wollaton. The royal Sandringham House in Norfolk includes prodigy elements in its mixed styles. Apart from private houses, elements of the prodigy style were popular for at least the exteriors of all other types of public buildings, and office buildings designed to impress.

Many of the houses were later demolished, in the English Civil War or other times, and many smothered by later rebuilding. But the period retained a prestige, especially for families who rose to prominence during it, and in many the exteriors at least were largely retained. The north fronts of The Vyne and Lyme Park are examples of a slightly incongruous mixture of the Elizabethan and Palladian in a single facade.

== Criticism ==
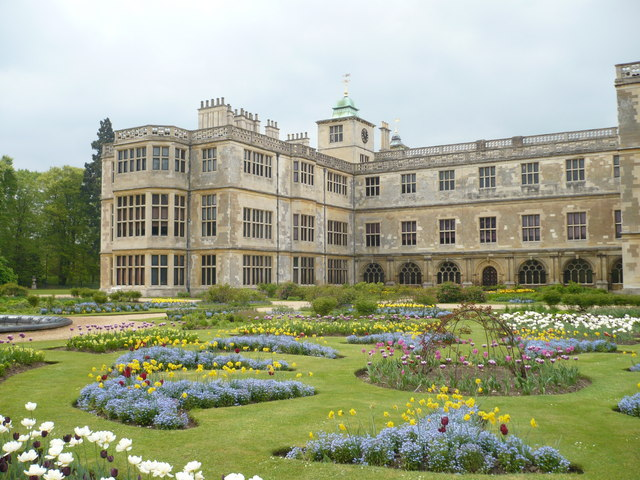
The rear of Audley End, Essex

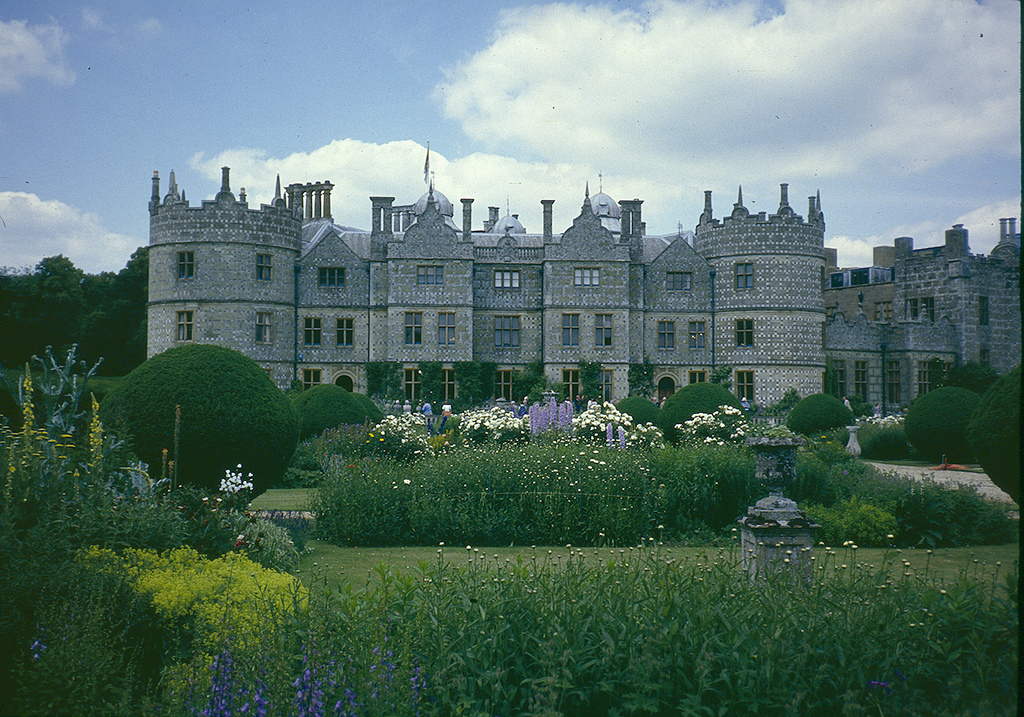
Longford Castle, Wiltshire, built on a triangular plan

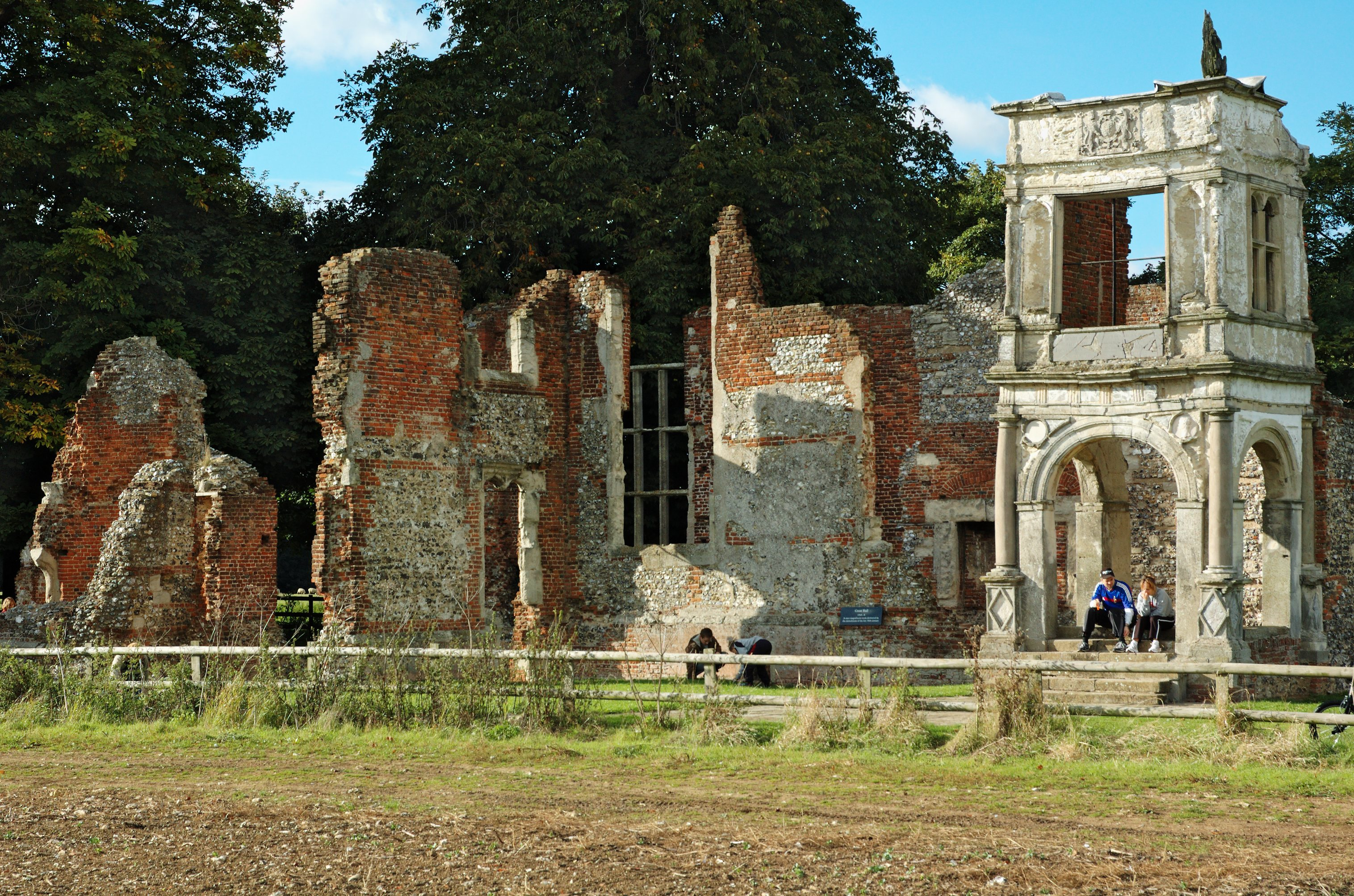
The ruins of Old Gorhambury House

The houses attracted criticism from the first, surprisingly often from their owners. The flattering poem To Penshurst by Ben Jonson (1616), contrasts Penshurst Place, a large and important late medieval house that was extended in a similar style under Elizabeth, with prodigy houses:

Thou art not, Penshurst, built to envious show,
Of touch or marble; nor canst boast a row
Of polished pillars, or a roof of gold;
Thou hast no lantern, whereof tales are told,
Or stair, or courts; but stand’st an ancient pile, ...

And though thy walls be of the country stone,
They’re reared with no man’s ruin, no man’s groan;
There’s none that dwell about them wish them down;
But all come in, the farmer and the clown, ...

Now, Penshurst, they that will proportion thee
With other edifices, when they see
Those proud, ambitious heaps, and nothing else,
May say their lords have built, but thy lord dwells.

As new fashions in architecture took over, the prodigy houses came to seem old-fashioned, and by the standards of Palladian architecture often over-fussy and over-decorated. Even though the style was being revived in his time, in 1905 the American architectural historian Charles Herbert Moore held that: "While one great house of the period differs from another in unimportant ways, those in which ornaments are extensively applied are without exception disfigured by them. The Elizabethan architectural ornamention is at once pretentious and grotesquely ugly." In particular "few are more tasteless and pretentious than Woolaton Hall", which he analyses.

== Alternatives ==
Though the style became dominant for very large houses from around 1570, there were alternatives. At Kenilworth Castle, Robert Dudley, 1st Earl of Leicester did not want to lose the historic royal associations of his building, and from 1563 modernised and extended it to harmonize the old and new, though the expanses of glass still impressed Midlanders. Bolsover Castle, Broughton Castle, Haddon Hall and Carew Castle in Wales were other sympathetic expansions of a medieval castle. The vernacular half-timbered style retained some popularity for gentry houses like Speke Hall and Little Moreton Hall, mostly in areas short of good building stone.

Earlier, Compton Wynyates (begun c. 1481, greatly extended 1515–1525) was a resolutely unsymmetrical jumble of essentially medieval styles, including prominent half-timbering on the gables of the facade. It also nestles in a hollow, as medieval houses often did, avoiding the worst of the wind. In contrast, prodigy houses, like castles before them, often deliberately chose exposed sites where they could command the landscape (Wollaton, Hardwick); their owners mostly did not anticipate being there in winter.

== Examples ==
=== Essentially intact ===
(especially on the exterior)

- Burghley House, Cambridgeshire
- Longleat House, Wiltshire
- Hatfield House, Hertfordshire
- Wollaton Hall, Nottingham
- Hardwick Hall, Derbyshire
- Longford Castle, Wiltshire
- Castle Ashby House, Northamptonshire
- Montacute House, Somerset
- Bramshill House, Hampshire
- Aston Hall, Birmingham
- Charlton Park, Wiltshire
- Barrington Court, Somerset, early Elizabethan E plan
- Astley Hall, Chorley, Lancashire
- Doddington Hall, Lincolnshire
- Fountains Hall, North Yorkshire, built with stone from Fountains Abbey next door
- Charlton House, London, relatively modest, to house James I's young son
- East Barsham Manor, Norfolk
- Burton Constable Hall, Yorkshire (exterior)

==== Early Henrician examples ====
- Hampton Court Palace
- Hengrave Hall, Suffolk
- Sutton Place, Surrey

=== Part-destroyed ===
- Audley End, Essex, two-thirds destroyed, though the surviving third is still roofed and furnished
- Berry Pomeroy Castle, Devon, rebuilt by the Seymours but never completed
- Kenilworth Castle, Warwickshire, rebuilt by Robert Dudley and ruined in the Civil War
- Kirby Hall, Northamptonshire, part destroyed shell
- Layer Marney Hall, Essex, Henrician and only ever part-built
- Old Gorhambury House, Hertfordshire, now ruined
- Oxwich Castle, West Glamorgan, substantial ruins remain

=== Now destroyed ===
- Holdenby House
- Nonsuch Palace, Surrey, a royal palace of Henry VIII, now destroyed
- Rocksavage, Cheshire
- Theobalds House
- Wimbledon House
- Worksop Manor
