= On the Record =

On-the-record, in journalism, means anything in a communication may be publicly disclosed.

On the Record may also refer to:

== Television ==
- On the Record (British TV programme), a weekly political TV show which aired between 1988 and 2002
- On the Record (American TV program), a legal news show on the Fox News Channel
- On the Record with Bob Costas

== Other uses ==
- On the Record, a radio program on Radio Australia
- On the Record (book), a collection of interviews from important players in the music industry
- On the Record (film), 2020 documentary film about sexual assault allegations against Russell Simmons
- On the Record (musical), Walt Disney Theatrical's touring 2004 musical revue
- On the Record (newspaper), a student newspaper at Toronto Metropolitan University

== See also ==
- For the Record (disambiguation)
- Off the Record (disambiguation)
- On Record (disambiguation)
- Record (disambiguation)
