= Vladimir Putin's meeting table =

Unusually long table in the Kremlin

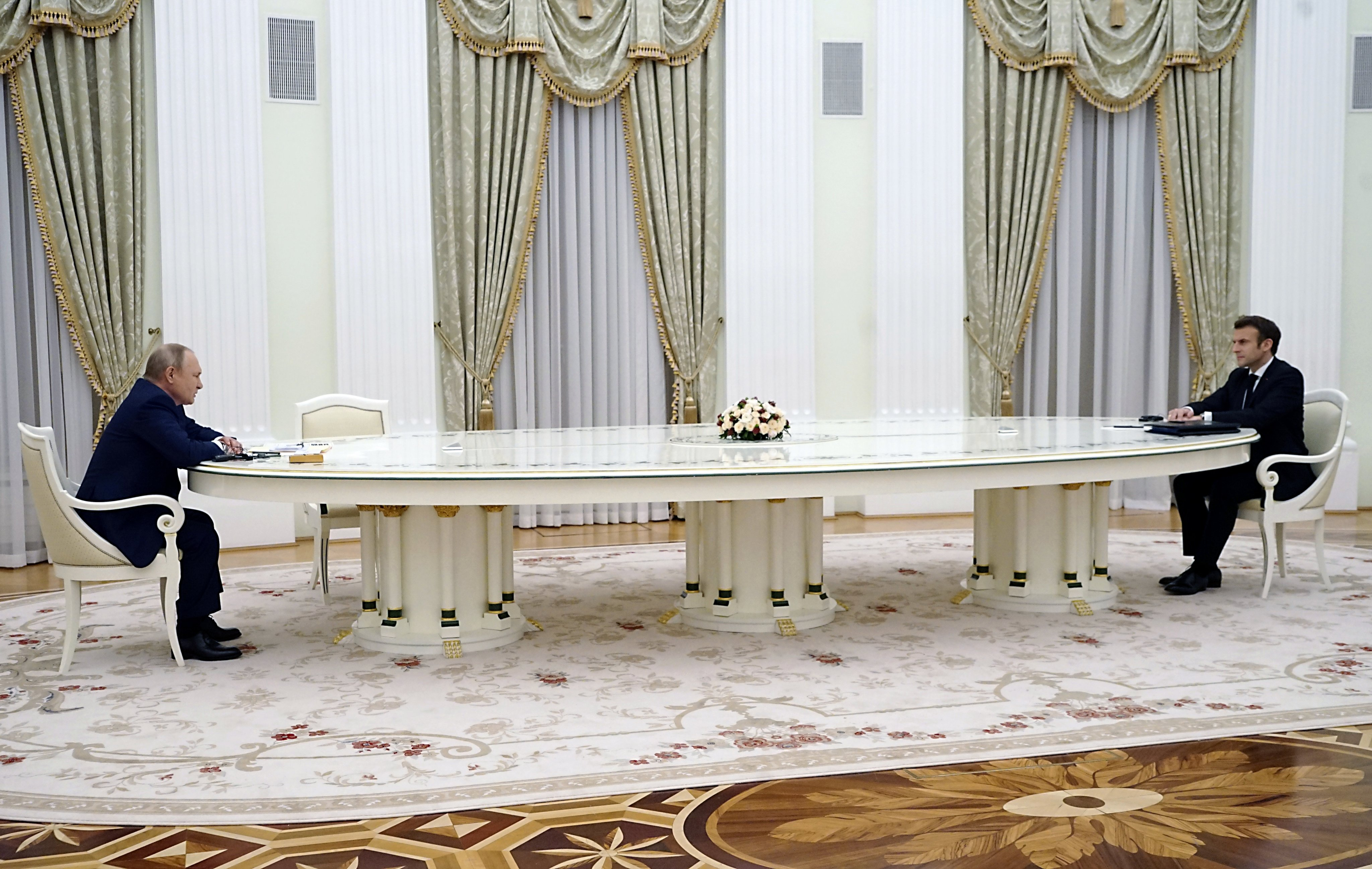
- Russian president Putin and French president Macron in 2022
- Designer: Oak Furniture
- Date: c. 1996
- Made in: Cantu, Como, Lombardy, Italy
- Materials: Beech wood
- Width: 6 m (20 ft)
- Collection: Kremlin

Vladimir Putin's meeting table is a white-topped oval beech table that was installed in the Kremlin in the late 1990s, during the presidency of Boris Yeltsin. It is reported that the table is 6 metres (20 ft) long, made from a single sheet of beech wood, and supported on three hollowed wooden stands. It is lacquered white and is gold-plated on the side. While being ordered under Yeltsin's presidency, it has received attention by the world media for its usage by Vladimir Putin in meetings with world leaders.

== Provenance ==
Creation of the table has been claimed by two groups: Italian manufacturer Oak Furniture, and Spanish Vincente Zaragozá.

Oak Furniture, a family-owned business from Cantù, Italy, claimed to have made the table, completing the order in 1995. This was as part of a €40–50 million deal to furnish 650 square metres (7,000 sq ft) over floors of the Kremlin between 1995 and 1997. Oak Furniture has also created fittings for other world leaders, including Muammar Gaddafi, Saddam Hussein, and royal palaces in Brunei and Thailand. The order comprised around seventy rooms, including the residence of the president. The furniture was designed in the style of the pre-1917 Kremlin: after the Russian Revolution, soviet leader Joseph Stalin removed much of the previous furniture in the rooms. The company maintains that the tabletop is made of a single piece of beech, and that it is lacquered white; it has three hollow legs, and is gold plated. According to Renato Pologna of Oak Furniture, the furniture for the deal was assembled in Italy and transported to Russia by plane: upon arrival it was scanned to prevent bugging. Pologna estimated that a similar table would cost approximately €100,000 (equivalent to €105,436 in 2023) if built new in 2022. Oak Furniture produced a certificate signed by Yeltsin, and a photo of the table in a 1999 book on the Kremlin to support their claim.

Spanish cabinet maker Vicente Zaragozá claimed to have made it during an interview with radio station COPE. Zaragozá is owner of an eponymous furniture company located in Alcàsser, Valencian Community, which closed down in 2020. The business made several orders of furniture for the Kremlin in the years 2002–2006, as well as for other former Soviet republics, such as for the presidency of Uzbekistan. According to Zaragozá, the table is made of Alpine white beech, inlaid with gold leaf, and was delivered to the Kremlin in 2005.

== Usage ==
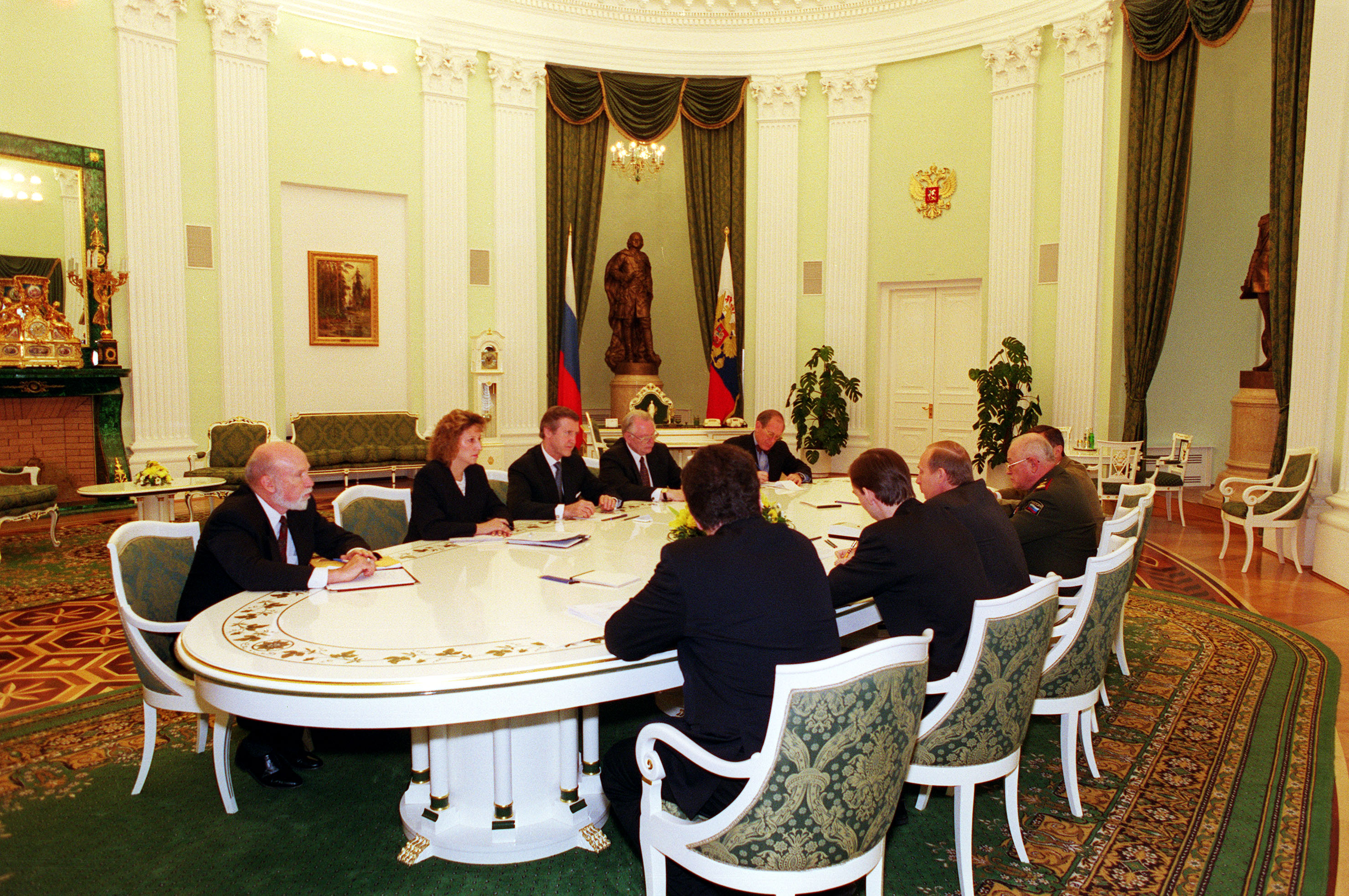
Table in use by President Putin in 2000

In 2022, Russian president Vladimir Putin used the table in meetings with world leaders such as Viktor Orbán, Emmanuel Macron, Olaf Scholz, and António Guterres, among others. Putin was pictured seated at one end of a very long white meeting table, with the other participants seated far away from him at the other end. Putin has also been pictured attending similarly distanced meetings with his own officials at other long tables. The table became the subject of numerous internet memes.

It has been speculated that Putin chooses to use the long table (1) in an attempt to intimidate and to project an image of power, and (2) for fear of contracting COVID-19. Putin has been pictured attending meetings in close proximity with Chinese Communist Party general secretary Xi Jinping and Belarusian president Alexander Lukashenko in the same period.

== See also ==
- Public image of Vladimir Putin
- Eglantine Table
- Sea Dog Table
- US presidential desks:
  - C&O desk, Hoover desk, Johnson desk, Resolute desk, Theodore Roosevelt desk, Wilson desk
