= The Record =

The Record may refer to:

== Music ==
- The Record (Fear album), a 1982 studio album by the hardcore-punk band Fear
- The Record (Boygenius album), a 2023 studio album by the indie rock supergroup Boygenius
- The Records, an English power pop band
- Their Greatest Hits: The Record, a 2001 greatest-hits album by the pop-music group Bee Gees

== Periodicals ==
=== Australia ===
- The Record (Melbourne), Australian weekly published 1869–1951
- The Record (Perth) (1874–present), Australian newspaper

=== Canada ===
- The Record (magazine) (1981–2001), Canadian music industry magazine
- The Record (Sherbrooke), Quebec, Canada newspaper
- The Record (Waterloo Region), Ontario, Canada newspaper

=== India ===
- The Record Music Magazine, Indian music magazine

=== United States ===
- The Philadelphia Record, a newspaper in Philadelphia published 1877–1947
- The Record, weekly newspaper in Leitchfield, Kentucky published by Landmark Community Newspapers
- The Record (Columbia University), the University's official publication
- The Record (Montgomery County, Pennsylvania) (1980s–90s), newspaper
- The Record (North Jersey), New Jersey newspaper
- The Record, cybersecurity news website published by Recorded Future
- The Record (Stockton, California), California newspaper
- The Record (Troy), New York newspaper
- The Yale Record, the USA's oldest college humor magazine, operated out of New Haven, Connecticut

== Other uses ==
- The Record (film), a 2000 South Korean horror film directed by Ki-Hun Kim

== See also ==
- Record (disambiguation)
