= Hardwick Hall =

Elizabethan country house in Derbyshire, England

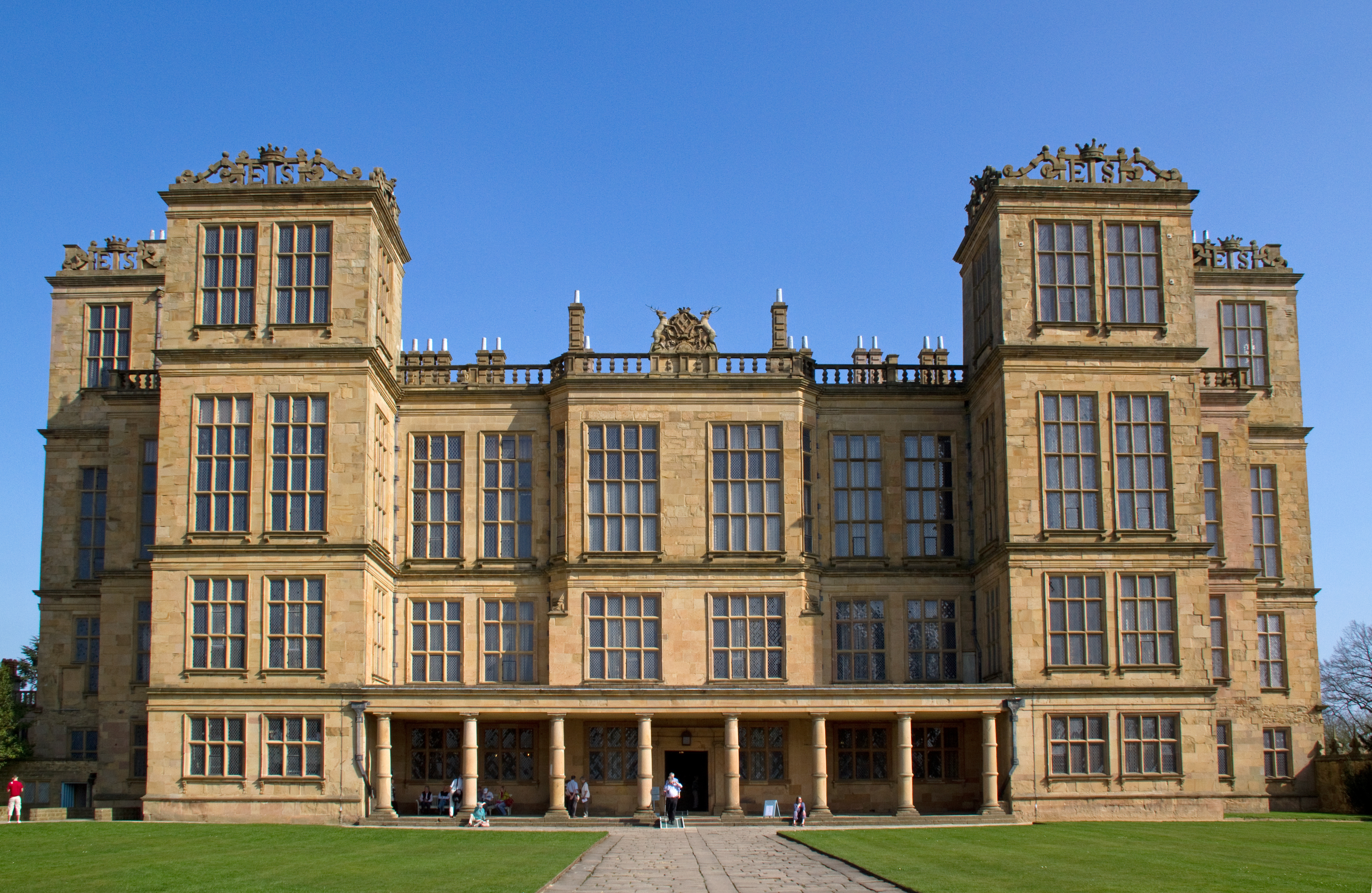
- "More glass than wall"

- Location within Derbyshire
- 53°10′08″N 1°18′32″W
- Type: Prodigy house
- Location: Doe Lea, Ault Hucknall, Derbyshire
- OS grid reference: SK 463 637

History
- Built: 1590–1597

Site notes
- Architect: Robert Smythson
- Architectural style: Renaissance
- Owner: National Trust
- Website: Hardwick Hall

Listed Building – Grade I
- Official name: Hardwick Hall
- Designated: 11 Jul 1951
- Reference no.: 1051617

Hardwick Hall is an architecturally significant Elizabethan-era country house in Derbyshire, England. A leading example of the Elizabethan prodigy house, the Renaissance style home was built between 1590 and 1597 for Bess of Hardwick to a design of the architect Robert Smythson. Hardwick Hall is one of the earliest examples of the English interpretation of this style, which came into fashion having slowly spread from Florence. Its arrival in Britain coincided with the period when it was no longer necessary or legal to fortify a domestic dwelling.

The British Army's 1st Parachute Brigade was formed at Hardwick Hall in 1941. The Airborne Forces Depot and Battle School was located on the grounds of the estate from 1942 to 1946.

After centuries in the Cavendish family and the line of the Earl of Devonshire and the Duke of Devonshire, ownership of the house was transferred to the Treasury in 1956 and then to the National Trust in 1959. The building was approaching ruin and required stabilisation and restoration.

The Hall is open to the public and received 298,283 visitors in 2019.

Hardwick Hall is surrounded by the 2,500 acre Hardwick Estate which contains meadows, woodland and ponds. The eastern side of Hardwick Estate extends into Nottinghamshire.

== History ==
=== 16th century ===
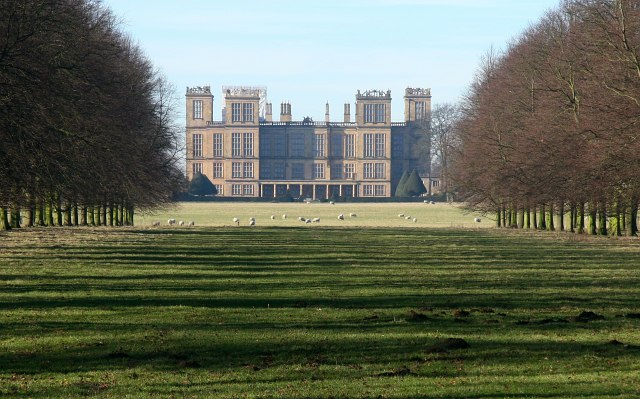
Lady Spencer's Walk

Designed by Robert Smythson in the late 16th century, Hardwick Hall is on a hilltop between Chesterfield and Mansfield overlooking the Derbyshire countryside. It was ordered by Bess of Hardwick, Countess of Shrewsbury and ancestress of the Dukes of Devonshire, and owned by her descendants until the mid-twentieth century.

Bess of Hardwick was the richest woman in England after Queen Elizabeth I, and her house was conceived to be a conspicuous statement of her wealth and power. The windows are exceptionally large and numerous at a time when glass was a luxury, leading to the saying, "Hardwick Hall, more glass than wall." In order to give more scope for huge windows without weakening the exterior walls, the Hall's chimneys are built into the internal walls of the structure.

The house's design also demonstrated new concepts not only in domestic architecture, but also of a more modern way in which life was led within a great house. Hardwick was one of the first English houses where the great hall was built on an axis through the centre of the home, rather than at right angles to the entrance.

Each of the three main storeys has a higher ceiling than the one below, indicative of the importance of the rooms' occupants.

A wide, winding, stone staircase leads up to the state rooms on the second floor, which include one of the largest long galleries in any English house. A tapestry-hung great chamber with a spectacular plaster frieze illustrating hunting scenes has been little altered.

A decorator, John "Paynter", used chalk and size made from glovers' offcuts. Pigments including blue bice, verdigris, massicot, and vermilion were bought in 1599. John varnished and coloured the panelling of the great chamber, and gilded some details. His paintwork supplemented and mended the cloth hangings, and he painted cloth hangings in imitation of tapestry.

The architecture was influential, and in March 1608 Robert Cecil, 1st Earl of Salisbury, who was planning new buildings at Hatfield House, asked Bess's son-in-law, Gilbert Talbot, 7th Earl of Shrewsbury, for "any rowgh drawght of Hardwick".

Bess was born in her father's manor house. Hardwick Old Hall, today a ruin beside the newer hall, was built on the site of this older building. Each of her four marriages had brought her greater wealth, and Hardwick Hall was but one of her many homes.

=== 17th century ===
Following Bess's death in 1608, the house passed to her son William Cavendish, 1st Earl of Devonshire. His great-grandson, William, was created 1st Duke of Devonshire in 1694. The Devonshires made Chatsworth, another of Bess's great houses, their principal seat. Hardwick thus was relegated to the role of an occasional retreat for hunting and sometime dower house. As a secondary home, it escaped the attention of modernisers and received few alterations after its completion.

The famed political philosopher Thomas Hobbes died at the Hall in December 1679. For the previous four or five years, Hobbes had lived at Chatsworth. Hobbes had been a friend of the family since 1608 when he first tutored William Cavendish. After his death, many of Hobbes' manuscripts were found at Chatsworth House.

=== 19th century ===
From the early 19th century, the antique atmosphere of Hardwick Hall was consciously preserved. A low, 19th-century service wing is fairly inconspicuous at the rear.

In 1844, William Cavendish, 6th Duke of Devonshire published a book called Handbook to Chatsworth and Hardwick. It was privately printed and provided a history of the Cavendish family's two estates.

=== 20th century ===
==== Second World War ====
On 31 August 1941, the decision was made to form the 1st Parachute Brigade under Brigadier Richard Gale at Hardwick. Army Northern Command leased 53 acres of the estate to establish a camp of red-brick huts with training areas. It included a gymnasium, a cookhouse, cinema and medical facility. Hardwick Camp then became the new nucleus for parachute training and physical selection for airborne forces. On 15 December 1941, the 2nd Parachute Battalion and 3rd Parachute Battalion formed at Hardwick with the 1st Air Troop Royal Engineers, the first airborne Royal Engineers unit, and a skeleton Royal Signals Squadron.

The camp was southwest of the Hall and consisted of a 250-foot (76 m) parachute jump tower, assault courses and trapeze in-flight swing training structures. When pre-jump training was successfully completed, the recruits that passed out were required to speed-march approximately 50 miles (80 km) to join the parachute course at RAF Ringway. A tethered barrage balloon was also installed on 1 November 1941 to provide refresher training for qualified parachutists and to supplement descents made from the jump tower.

In 1942, when the 1st Parachute Brigade moved from Hardwick to Bulford Garrison, an Airborne Forces Depot was formed at Hardwick from the units left behind. It started as an unofficial establishment but was created as a properly organized unit, training and holding recruits before they went to the Parachute Training School, as well as rehabilitating the temporary unfit from injuries. The War Office approved a War Establishment for the depot on 25 December 1942, appointing Lt Col W. Giles MC (Ox and Bucks) as its first commanding officer. The depot was given an extended role and consisted of a depot company, a pre-parachute training company, a battle school, a holding company and an airfield detachment, which was stationed at No.1 Parachute Training School (No.1 PTS), RAF Ringway. During this period, all pre-jump ground training was moved from Hardwick to Ringway.

In March 1944, the Battle School closed, and the Holding Unit was moved to nearby Clay Cross, while a new preliminary Battle School was set up at Dore and Totley. The Selection Company and Depot Administrative Unit remained at Hardwick.

In April 1946, the Depot moved to Albany Barracks on the Isle of Wight and Airborne Forces activity at Hardwick Hall ceased.

==== Post War ====
When the British Army left their battle school and village after the war, it was turned into a Polish resettlement camp for allied soldiers. Here Polish veterans, and later Hungarian refugees, were homed until they managed to find a more permanent place to stay.

In 1950, the unexpected death of the 10th Duke of Devonshire, with the subsequent death duties (rated at 80%), caused the sale of many of the Devonshire assets and estates. At this time, Hardwick was occupied by Evelyn, Duchess of Devonshire, the widow of the 9th Duke. The decision was taken to hand the house over to HM Treasury in lieu of Estate Duty in 1956. The Treasury transferred the house to the National Trust in 1959. The Duchess remained in occupation of the house until her death in 1960. Having done much, personally, to conserve the textiles in the house as well as reinstating the traditional rush matting, she was its last occupant.

== Today ==
Hardwick Hall contains a large collection of embroideries, mostly dating from the late 16th century. Some of the needlework on display incorporates Bess's "ES" monogram, and may have been worked on by her. There is a large amount of fine tapestry and furniture from the 16th and 17th centuries, listed with the embroidery and other contents in an inventory of the home’s contents dating from 1601. The Sea Dog Table is an especially important piece from around 1600, and the Eglantine Table has an inlaid top of interest to musical historians.

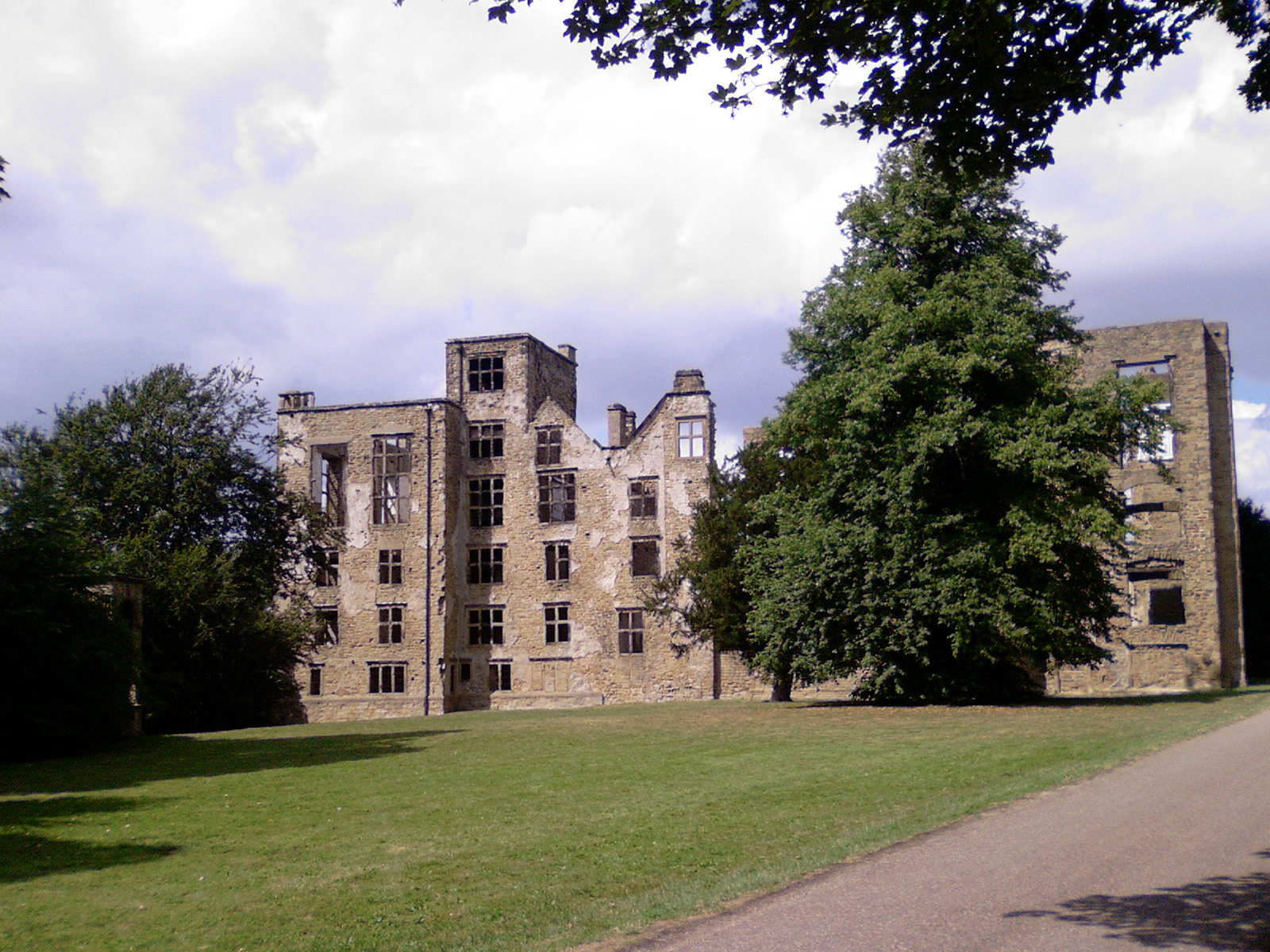
Hardwick Old Hall

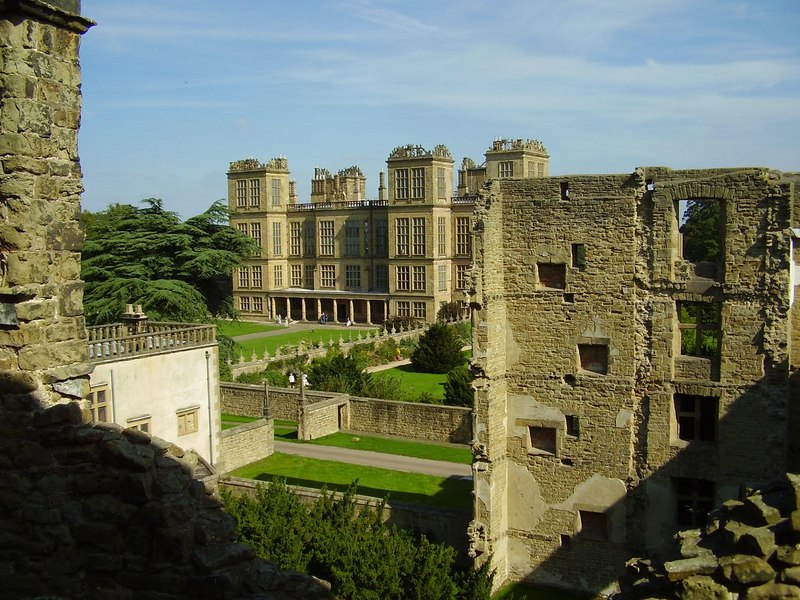
Hardwick Hall from Hardwick Old Hall

Hardwick is open to the public. It has a fine garden, including herbaceous borders, a vegetable and herb garden, and an orchard. The extensive grounds also contain the ruins of Hardwick Old Hall, the original Manor home, which was used as guest and service accommodation after the new hall was built. It is administered by English Heritage on behalf of the National Trust, and is also open to the public. Many of the Old Hall's major rooms were decorated with ambitious schemes of plasterwork, notably above the fireplaces. Though most of the building is unroofed, impressive fragments of plasterwork remain (protected by preservative coatings and rain-shields).

Both Hardwick Hall and the Old Hall are Grade I listed (the highest designation) by Historic England.

Dan Cruickshank, an historian specialising in architecture, selected the Hall in 2006 as one of his five choices for Britain's Best Buildings, a documentary series made by the BBC for television. Innovative in its own time, it would serve, three centuries later, as a source of inspiration for the enormous Main Exhibition Building at the Philadelphia Centennial Exhibition of 1876. Hardwick Hall was an ideal model for a building which was intended to merge historicism with the large expanses of glass that had become de rigueur for the main exhibition halls at international expositions and fairs in the wake of the success of The Crystal Palace constructed for the 1851 London Exhibition.

In March 2012, a £6.5m restoration was completed; this included the addition of a large restaurant. In December 2020, three years of additional restoration had been completed and further work was being planned.

== In the media ==
Hardwick Hall was the setting for the 10-part BBC series Mistress of Hardwick, broadcast in 1972, and location filming took place there. Hardwick Hall was used in the 1978 Connections TV series to illustrate a long series of changes that occurred in home design as a result of the Little Ice Age. The house was described in the 1985 TV documentary Treasure Houses of Britain. Hardwick Hall was used for the exterior scenes and some interior scenes of Malfoy Manor in the 2010 film Harry Potter and the Deathly Hallows – Part 1.

== Gallery ==
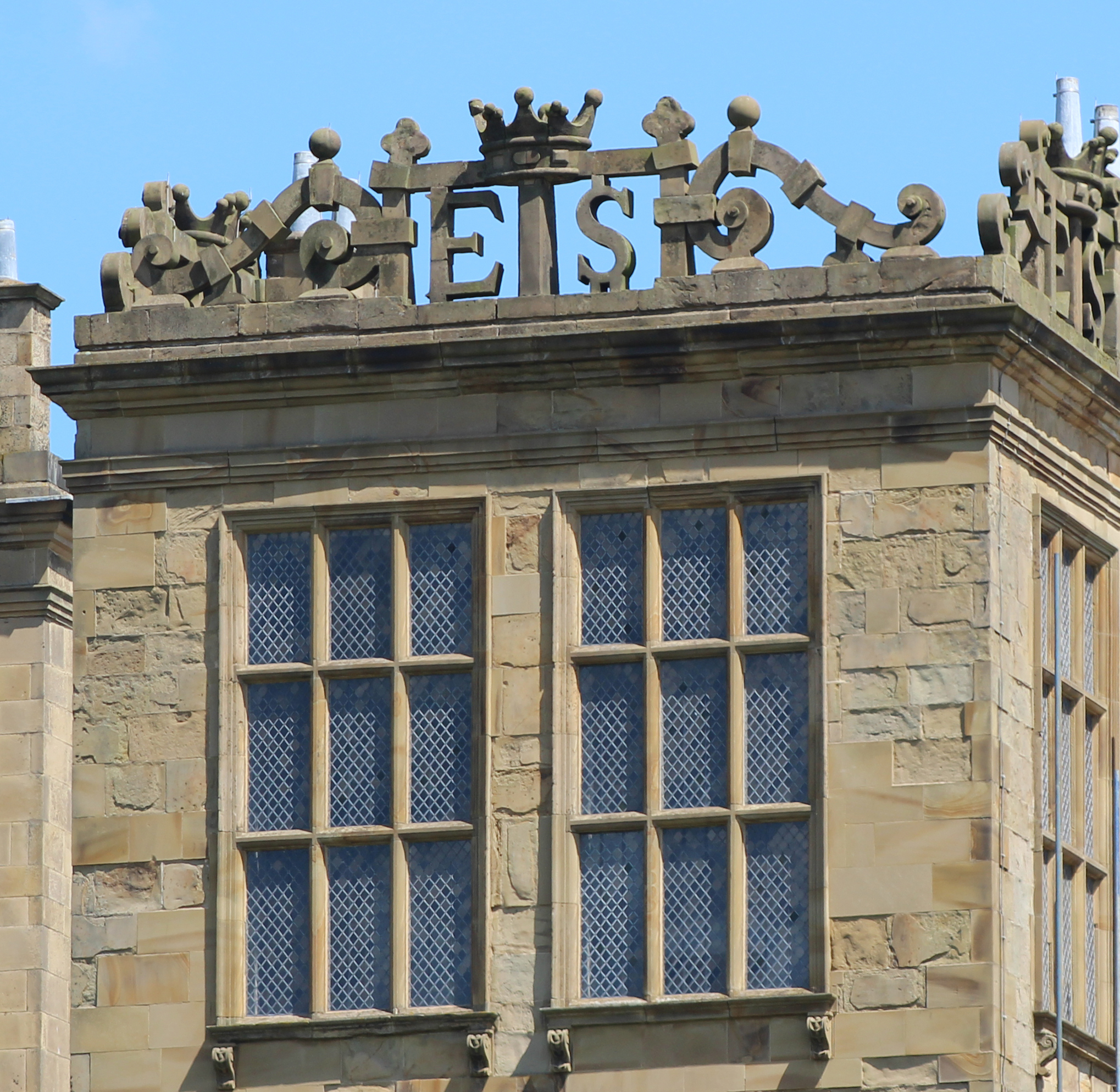
Hardwick's skyline features six rooftop banqueting house pavilions with Bess of Hardwick's initials "ES" (Elizabeth Shrewsbury) in openwork.

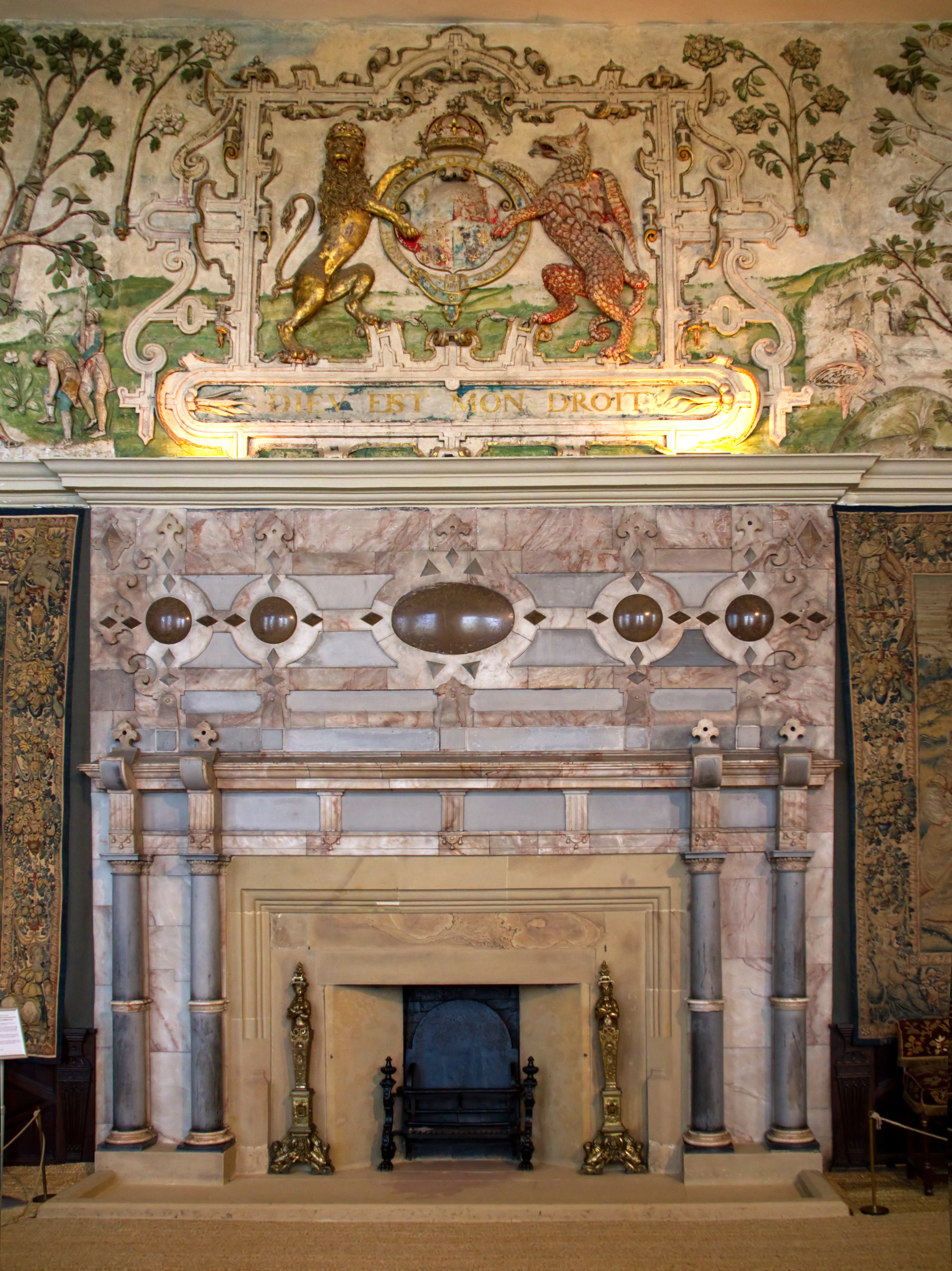
Chimneypiece in High Great Chamber

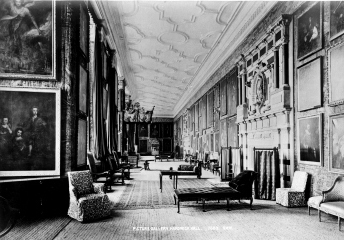
Hardwick's long gallery in the 1890s

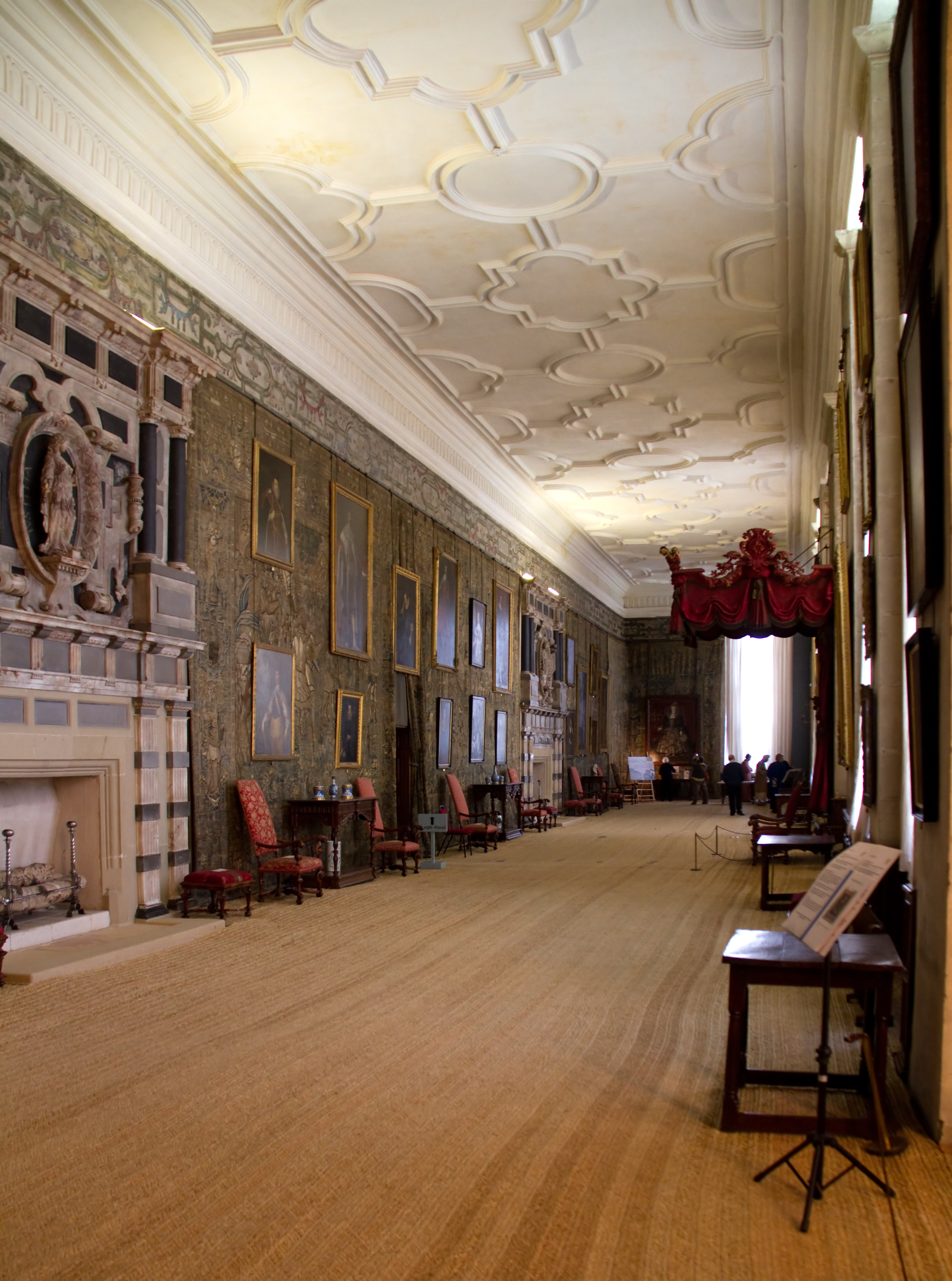
Hardwick's long gallery today

== See also ==
- Grade I listed buildings in Derbyshire
- Listed buildings in Ault Hucknall
- Chatsworth House
- Stainsby Mill
