= John Coale =

American lawyer (born 1946)

United States Special Envoy for Belarus
- Incumbent
- Assumed office November 10, 2025
- President: Donald Trump
- Preceded by: Position established

Deputy United States Special Envoy for Ukraine
- Incumbent
- Assumed office March 15, 2025
- President: Donald Trump
- Special Envoy: Keith Kellogg
- Preceded by: Position established

Special Presidential Envoy for Hostage Affairs
- Incumbent
- Assumed office TBA
- Preceded by: Adam Boehler

Personal details
- Born: John Purcell Coale; December 21, 1946 (age 79)
- Spouse: Greta Van Susteren (m. 1988)
- Domestic partner: Mary Sachse (1965)
- Education: University of Baltimore (BA, JD)

John Purcell Coale (born December 21, 1946) is an American lawyer who has served as the United States special envoy to Belarus since November 2025 and the deputy United States special envoy for Ukraine since March 2025.

== Early life and education (1946–1973) ==
John Purcell Coale was born on December 21, 1946. Coale attended the Severn School and the University of Baltimore and its School of Law. In December 1965, while attending the University of Baltimore, he was engaged to Mary Sachse.

== Career ==
=== Early work (1973–1981) ===
In January 1973, Coale was assigned to the Juvenile Court in Maryland as an assistant state prosecutor. In March, he was arrested on charges of drunken driving. Coale resigned following his arrest. In April 1976, he got engaged to Sheldon Stump; they married in June and moved to Florida. In December 1979, Coale represented two Marines who were imprisoned and released from the embassy of the United States in Tehran amid the Iran hostage crisis. The Marines sued Iran and its supreme leader, Ruhollah Khomeini, claiming their civil rights were violated. Coale also represented former hostages who sued after the ratification of the Algiers Accords, which prevented them from seeking damages. A nine-member presidential commission later determined that the former hostages should receive approximately US$5,500 each, a recommendation Coale rebuffed and called "ridiculous".

=== Political work (2008–2011) ===
In September 2008, Coale endorsed John McCain for president in that year's presidential election, though he repeatedly traveled with Hillary Clinton throughout the 2008 Democratic Party presidential primaries. Coale told Newsweek that the Democratic Party was being taken over by "moveon.org types". He added that he had told Clinton's brother, Tony Rodham, not to meet with Carly Fiorina, a surrogate for McCain's campaign, believing it would embarrass the Clinton campaign; Rodham did so regardless. In March 2009, The Washington Post's Chris Cillizza reported that Coale had become an advisor to Alaska governor Sarah Palin, who ran as McCain's running mate. After Coale's wife, Greta Van Susteren, conducted a series of interviews with Palin and her husband, Todd, Van Susteren refuted Cillizza's report. In May, Politico's Jonathan Martin reported that Coale had urged Palin in February to assist in Clinton's campaign debt. Coale established Palin's political action committee in 2009.

=== Trump work (2021–2025) ===
In December 2025, Connecticut senator Richard Blumenthal, the ranking member of the Senate Homeland Security Permanent Subcommittee on Investigations, sent a letter to Coale inquiring about his invitation to a dinner for donors of Donald Trump's White House State Ballroom. Coale told Blumenthal that he was invited for securing YouTube's settlement to the Trust for the National Mall over a lawsuit involving the suspension of Trump's YouTube account following the January 6 Capitol attack.

=== United States special envoy (2025–present) ===
By March 2025, Coale had become the deputy United States special envoy for Ukraine. In June, he helped secure the release of fourteen political prisoners from Belarus. On November 9, president Donald Trump announced that Coale would serve as the special envoy for Belarus.

== Views ==
In March 2009, Gawker reported on a memorandum Coale had written advocating for a political action committee for Scientology. Coale stated that he was level Clear.
