= On Record =

On Record may refer to:

- On Record (album), album by April Wine
- On Record (film), 1917 silent film

== See also ==
- For the Record (disambiguation)
- Off the Record (disambiguation)
- On the record (disambiguation)
- Record (disambiguation)
