= Eglantine Table =

Large inlaid table

The Eglantine Table is a large inlaid table located on the first floor at Hardwick Hall. The inlay depicts an almost complete Morley consort, including inlay depictions of sheet music, a violin with frets, sets of recorders and wind instruments. The table is oak, with walnut and other woods used for the inlays. It is 90 cm (35 in) high, 302 cm (119 in) long and 129 cm (51 in) wide. Like much of the furniture at Hardwick, it is recorded in an inventory of the house made in 1601.

The table is discussed by John Playford. The frets may have been used so as to play dance music with an entirely open string sound rather than for accuracy. In addition there are depicted playing cards from the Tudor Period and other means of amusement such as backgammon, and floral decoration. All the objects seem to be close to actual size; it seems very credible that the lute and the violin are actual size. There is one other inlaid Tudor table of this quality in existence, in the Burrell Collection, Glasgow.

Eglantine is a white rose, one of the family emblems and the table was probably a commission for a multiple marriage celebration in 1568, since the inlays include the arms of Hardwick, Talbot, and Cavendish. In that year Bess of Hardwick married her fourth husband, George Talbot, 6th Earl of Shrewsbury and her son Henry Cavendish and her daughter Mary, married two of his children. Despite this, the National Trust do not venture to date it.

== See also ==
- Sea Dog Table
- Vladimir Putin's meeting table
