= Greta Van Susteren =

American commentator, television personality, and lawyer (born 1954)

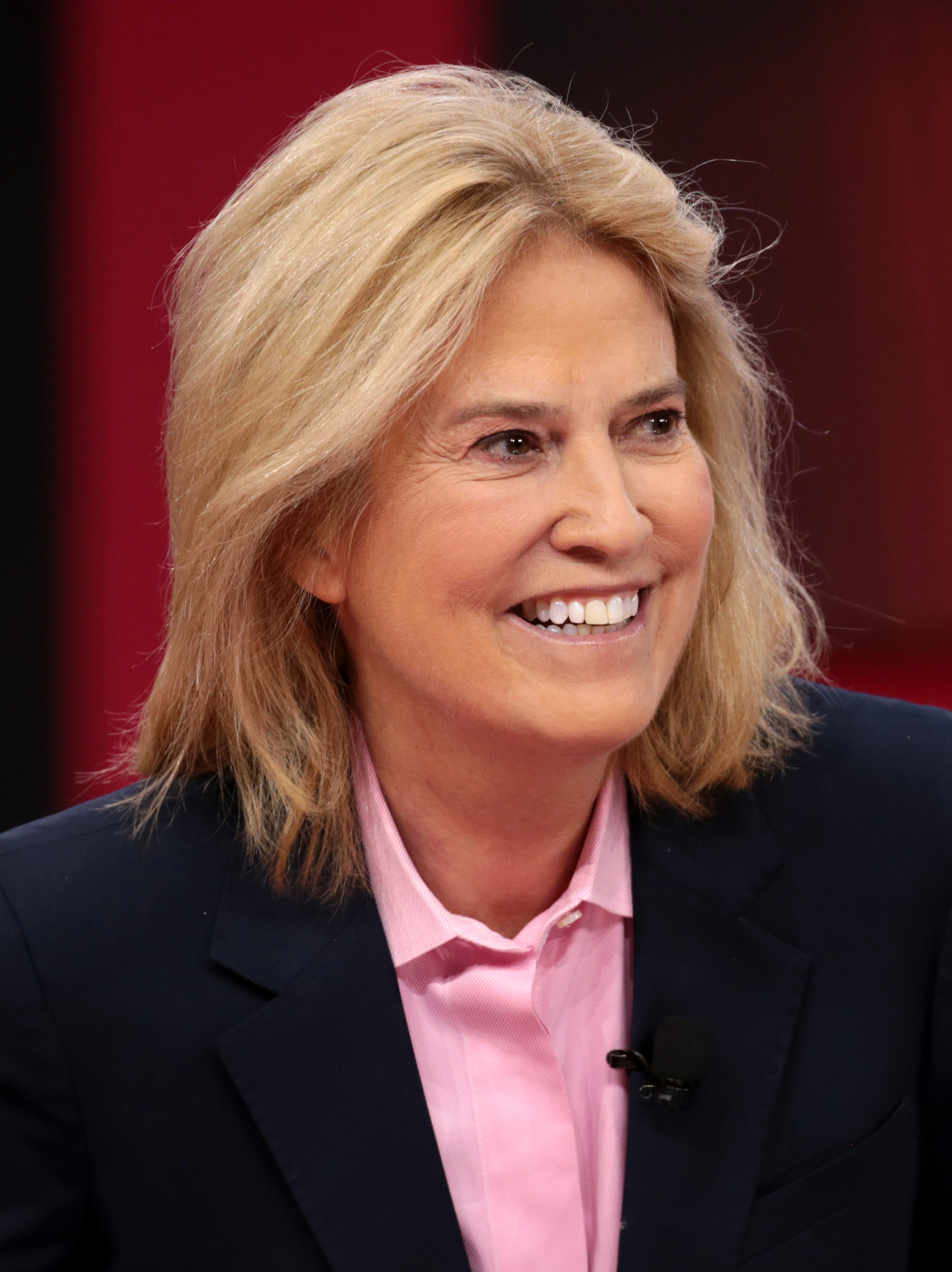
- Van Susteren 2018
- Born: Greta Conway Van Susteren; June 11, 1954 (age 72); Appleton, Wisconsin, U.S.
- Education: University of Wisconsin–Madison (BA); Georgetown University (JD)
- Occupations: Television presenter; news anchor; commentator
- Years active: 1979–present
- Television: Burden of Proof, The Point, On the Record, For the Record
- Spouse: John P. Coale (m. 1988)

Greta Conway Van Susteren (born June 11, 1954) is an American journalist, lawyer and television news anchor for Newsmax TV. She was previously on CNN, Fox News, and MSNBC. She hosted Fox News's On the Record w/ Greta Van Susteren for 14 years (2002–2016) before departing for MSNBC, where she hosted For the Record with Greta for roughly six months in 2017. On June 14, 2022, she began hosting The Record with Greta van Susteren on Newsmax. A former criminal defense and civil trial lawyer, she appeared as a legal analyst on CNN co-hosting Burden of Proof with Roger Cossack from 1994 to 2002, playing defense attorney to Cossack's prosecutor. In 2016, she was listed as the 94th most powerful woman in the world by Forbes, up from 99th in 2015.

== Early life ==
Greta Conway Van Susteren was born in Appleton, Wisconsin. Her father, Urban Van Susteren, was of Dutch descent. Her mother, born Margery Conway, was a homemaker of Irish descent. Van Susteren's father was a longtime friend of future U.S. Senator Joseph McCarthy, who was best man at Greta's parents' wedding. Urban Van Susteren, an elected judge, served as a campaign strategist for McCarthy but later broke with McCarthy.

Van Susteren's sister, Lise, is a forensic psychiatrist in Bethesda, Maryland. In 2006, Lise was a candidate for the Democratic nomination for United States Senate. Her brother, Dirk Van Susteren, was a journalist and long-time editor of the Vermont Sunday magazine, jointly published, until folding in 2008, by the Rutland Herald and the Barre Montpelier Times Argus.

Van Susteren graduated from Xavier High School in Appleton in 1972 and the University of Wisconsin–Madison in 1976, where she studied geography and economics. She later earned a J.D. from Georgetown University Law Center in 1979 and prior to the start of her television work returned to Georgetown Law as an adjunct faculty member in addition to her full-time legal career. She was awarded an honorary doctor of laws degree from Stetson Law School.

== Career ==
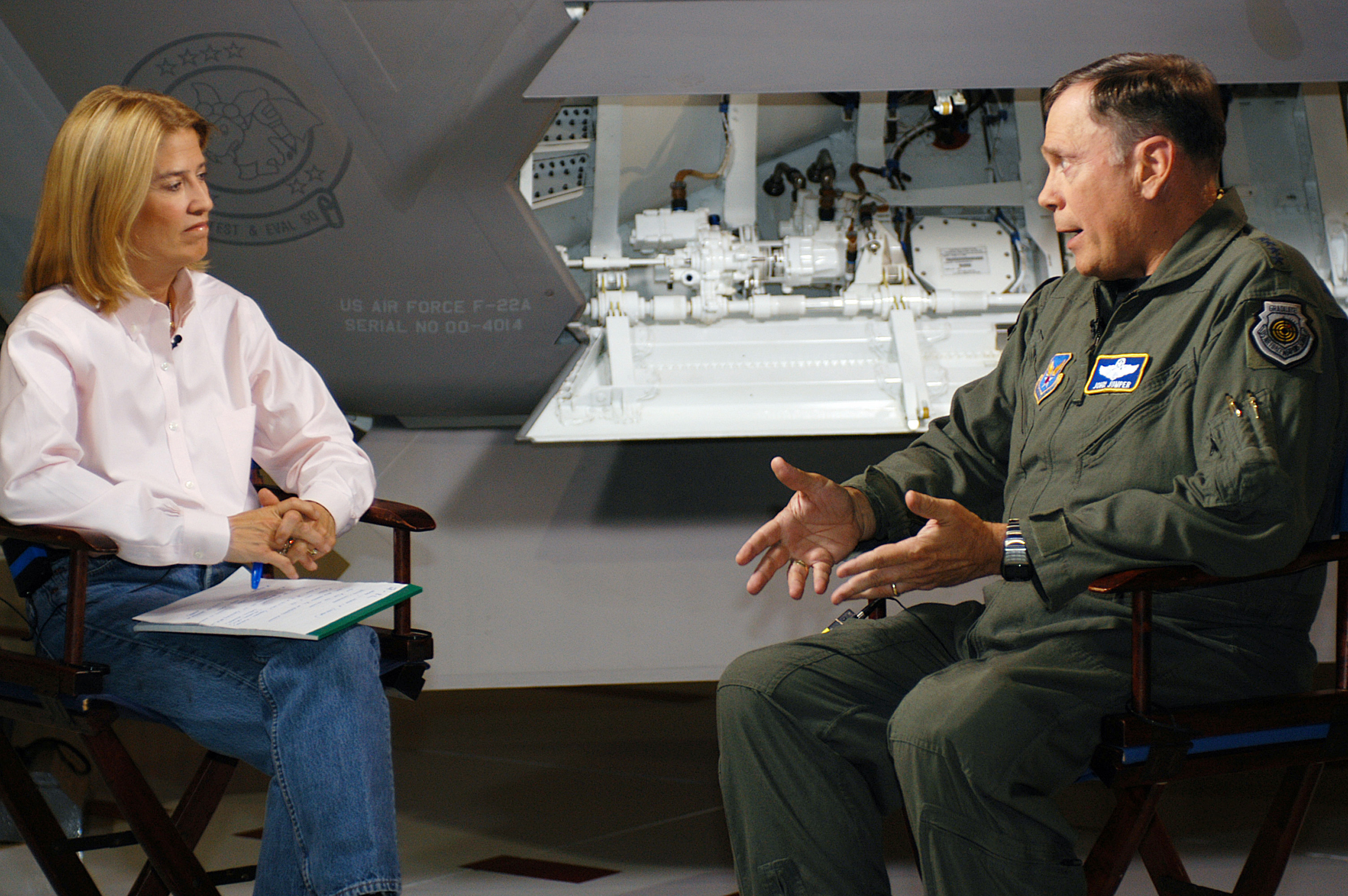
Van Susteren interviewing Chief of Staff of the United States Air Force John P. Jumper in 2004

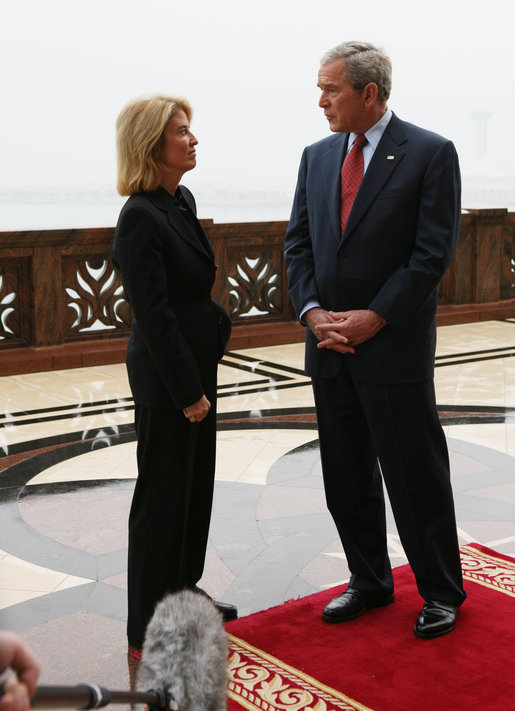
Van Susteren interviews President George W. Bush in January 2008

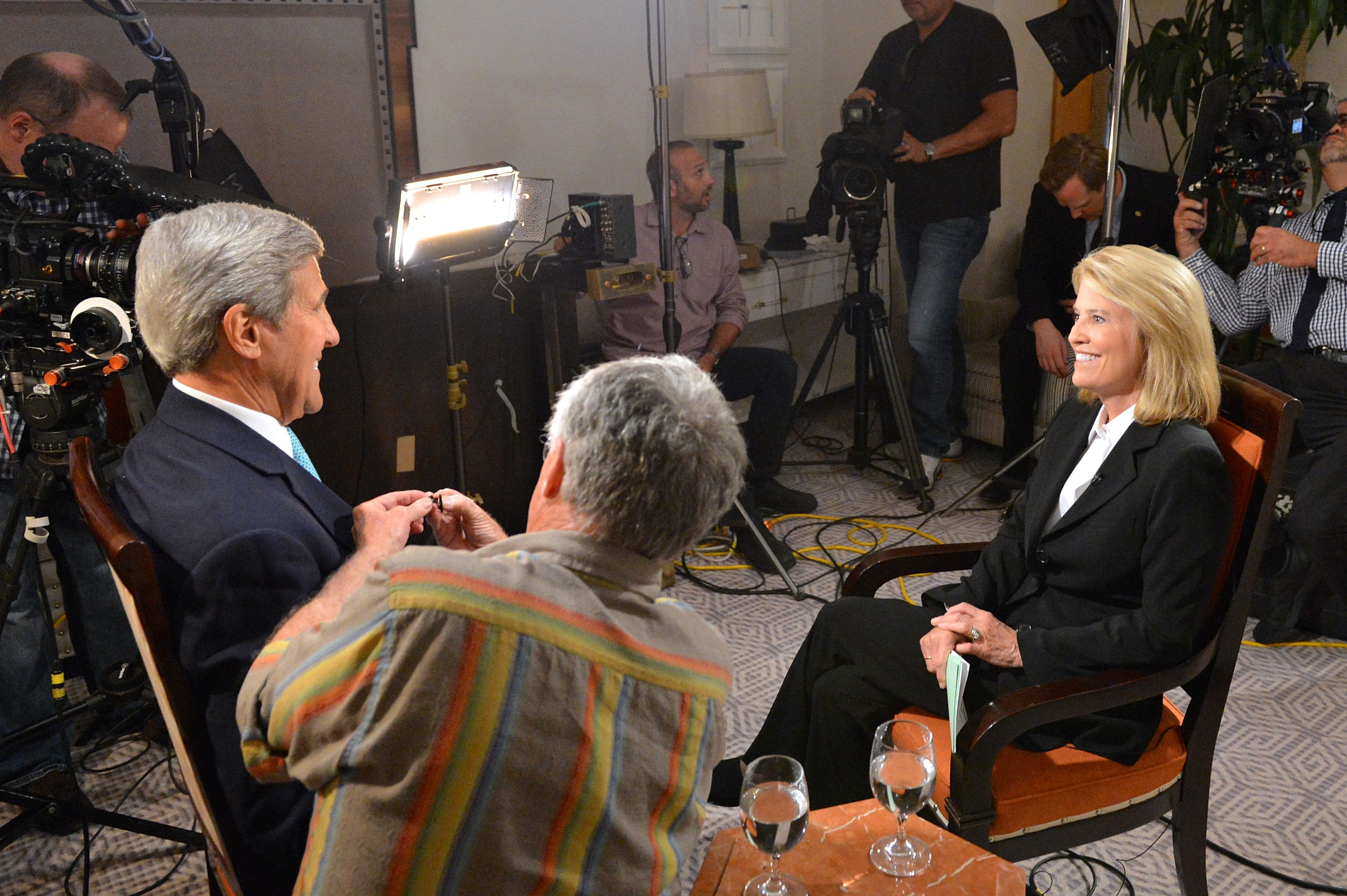
Van Susteren and Secretary of State John Kerry prepare for a 2015 Fox News interview

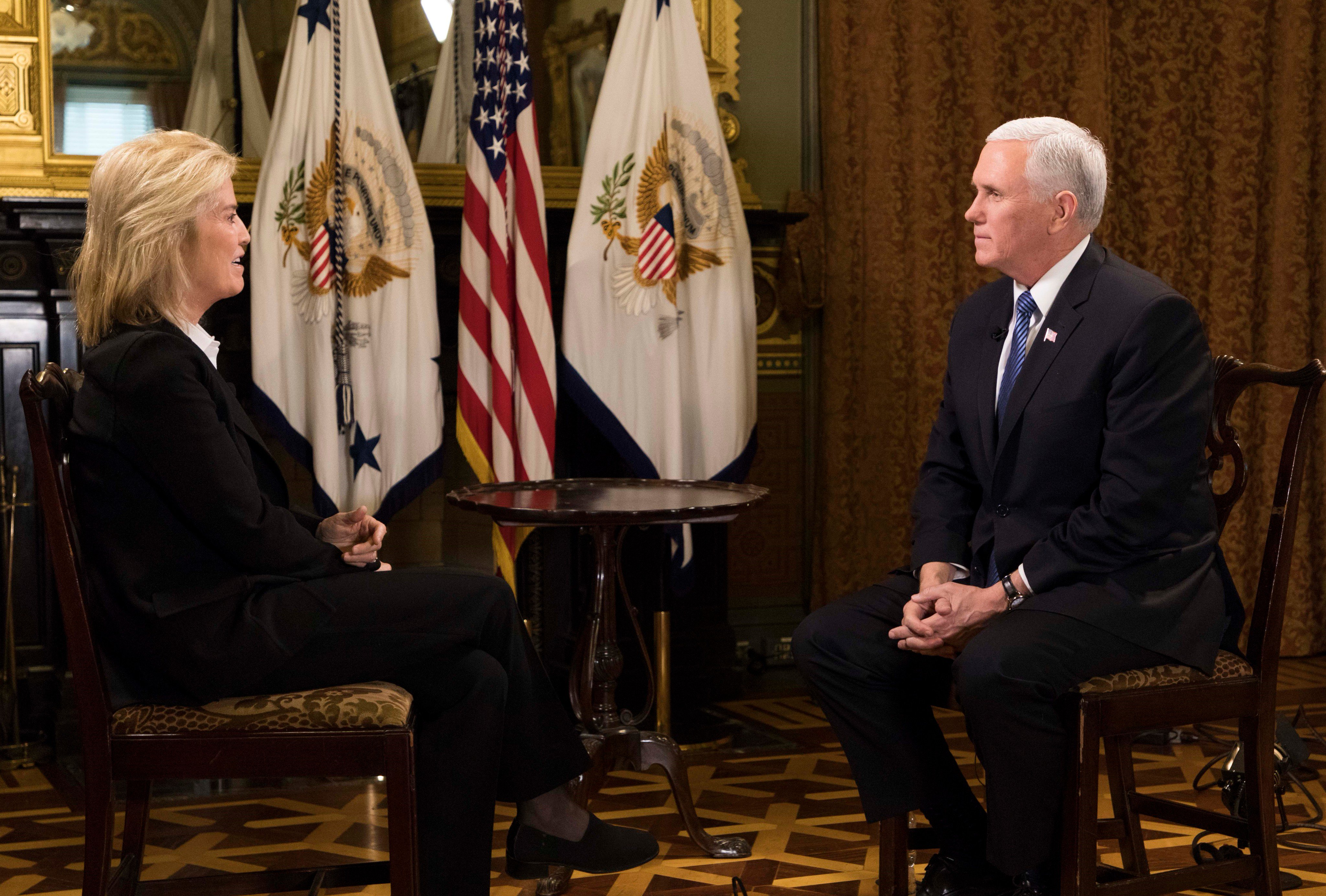
Van Susteren interviews Vice President Mike Pence in January 2018 for Voice of America

During coverage of the O. J. Simpson murder trial, she appeared regularly on CNN as a legal analyst. This led to her stint as co-host of CNN's Burden of Proof and The Point.

During the Clinton impeachment debate, Van Susteren dismissed the issue as one of an unfaithful husband, and not an impeachable offense.

In 2002, Van Susteren switched to the Fox News Channel after a highly publicized contract-bidding war. Before starting at Fox she also underwent cosmetic surgery that significantly changed her look. She hosted the current affairs show On the Record w/ Greta Van Susteren.

On September 6, 2016, she resigned from Fox News. She was not able to say goodbye on-air, as the network immediately filled the On the Record anchor spot with Brit Hume. Van Susteren, who said that Fox "has not felt like home to me for a few years," chose to take advantage of a clause in her contract that allowed her to resign from the network immediately: "The clause had a time limitation, meaning I could not wait."

In early 2017, Van Susteren signed on with NBC News to anchor the 6 p.m. ET program on its 24-hour cable news channel, MSNBC. The program, titled For the Record with Greta, launched on January 9, 2017. On June 29, 2017, according to Van Susteren on Twitter, she was "out at MSNBC" as her new program did not do well in ratings.

In October 2017, Van Susteren joined Voice of America as a contributor.

In February 2019, Van Susteren joined Gray Television, a large group of television stations, as its chief national political analyst out of Gray's Washington bureau, providing commentary and analysis to the newscasts airing on Gray's 140+ stations. She was also developing two nationally syndicated shows for the company. In April 2019, Van Susteren and Gray announced Full Court Press with Greta Van Susteren, a Sunday morning talk show, which would begin airing on most Gray stations in September 2019, along with Weigel Broadcasting stations in Chicago and Milwaukee. With Gray stations in Iowa and South Carolina, the program hoped to get candidate interviews for such early election primary states. The program planned to roll out "Full Court Press-Overtime", a website and associated app with additional content and user feedback.

In May 2022, it was announced that Van Susteren had joined Newsmax TV, and on June 14, she started hosting The Record with Greta Van Susteren.

== In popular culture ==
A 2006 episode of Family Guy, "Mother Trucker", features a gag prominently including a billboard of Susteren.

== Personal life ==
Van Susteren married tort lawyer John P. Coale in 1988. She and her husband are Scientologists. In 1995, in an interview with People, she said she is "a strong advocate of their ethics".

From August 2006 until January 2014, she was a co-owner of the Old Mill Inn, a restaurant in Mattituck, New York, on the North Fork of Long Island.

Van Susteren is on the board of directors at the National Institute for Civil Discourse (NICD). The institute was created at the University of Arizona in the aftermath of the shooting that killed six people and injured 13 others, including U.S. Representative Gabby Giffords.

She visited Myanmar several times and testified before Congress to draw attention to the human rights abuses and genocide against the Rohingya people.
