= Off the record =

Off the record may refer to:

- Off the record (journalism), a communication that may not be publicly disclosed

== Arts, entertainment, and media ==
=== Books ===
- Off the Record: The Private Papers of Harry S. Truman, a 1980 book edited by historian Robert Hugh Ferrell
- Off the Record: Picking Up the Pieces After Losing My Dream Job at the White House, a 2020 book by Madeleine Westerhout

=== Music ===
==== Albums ====
- Off the Record (Karl Bartos album), 2013
- Off the Record (Makaya McCraven album), 2025
- Off the Record (Neil Innes album), 1982
- Off the Record (Sweet album), 1977
- Off the Record, by Paul van Dyk, 2022
- Off the Record, an EP by Jesse McCartney, 2005
- Off the Record, an EP by Torae, 2011

==== Songs ====
- "Off the Record" (Ive song), 2023
- "Off the Record" (My Morning Jacket song), 2005
- "Off the Record" (Tinchy Stryder song), 2011
- "Off the Record", a song written by George M. Cohan, appearing in the 1942 film Yankee Doodle Dandy
- "Off the Record", a song by Hieroglyphics from the album 3rd Eye Vision

=== Television ===
- Off the Record (TV series), a 1948 TV series starring Zero Mostel that lasted just 2 episodes on the DuMont network
- Girls Aloud: Off the Record, a 2006 reality television series starring pop group Girls Aloud
- Off the Record with Michael Landsberg, also known as Off the Record or OTR, a Canadian sports talk television show that aired on TSN

=== Other uses in arts, entertainment, and media ===
- Off the Record (film), a 1939 American film
- Off the Record (play), a 1947 comedy by Ian Hay
- Dead Rising 2: Off the Record, a 2011 video game

== Other uses ==
- Off the Record (charity), a mental health charity in Bristol, England
- Off-the-Record Messaging, an instant messaging encryption system

== See also ==
- For the Record (disambiguation)
- On Record (disambiguation)
- On the Record (disambiguation)
