= For the Record with Greta =

American television series

- Current title card
- Genre: General politics/news program
- Created by: Phil Griffin
- Presented by: Greta Van Susteren
- Country of origin: United States
- Original language: English

Production
- Production locations: Washington, D.C.
- Camera setup: Multi-camera
- Running time: 60 minutes

Original release
- Network: MSNBC
- Release: January 9 – June 28, 2017

Related
- On the Record with Greta Van Susteren

For the Record with Greta is an American news television program hosted by Greta Van Susteren, which began airing on MSNBC on January 9, 2017. It was created after she moved from Fox News to MSNBC amidst sexual allegations against Roger Ailes, although she defended him. She has stated she was "troubled by the culture" at Fox News. Van Susteren pitched the show as "fair and balanced."

For the Record was cancelled on June 29, 2017, after Van Susteren departed MSNBC. The final episode aired the previous day on June 28, 2017. The program had lower viewership than comparable shows on MSNBC, which likely contributed to the cancellation. On July 24, 2017, For the Record was replaced with The Beat with Ari Melber in its 6 p.m. ET timeslot.

== See also ==
- On the Record
