= On the Record (American TV program) =

American news television program (2002–2016)

- Former title card for On the Record during Van Susteren's tenure
- Genre: Current affairs program
- Presented by: Greta Van Susteren (2002–2016); Brit Hume (2016)
- Country of origin: United States
- Original language: English

Production
- Production location: Washington, D.C. or New York City
- Camera setup: Multi-camera
- Running time: 60 minutes

Original release
- Network: Fox News Channel
- Release: February 4, 2002 – November 11, 2016

Related
- Tucker Carlson Tonight; Special Report with Bret Baier (de facto); For the Record with Greta

On the Record is an American news television program on Fox News hosted by the lawyer Greta Van Susteren. Prior to the show's cancellation after the 2016 election, the show was hosted by the television journalist and political commentator, Brit Hume, following Van Susteren's departure from Fox News on September 6, 2016. The show was named On the Record with Greta Van Susteren and On the Record with Brit Hume during each host's respective runs.

The program featured news stories of the day, following the latest information from correspondents on location and officials related to the issue. Like most networks, the program also consisted of analysis from legal analysts of the network and the host on the stories it was following. Additionally, the program also derailed from criminal stories to follow breaking news of the day, as do other programs on the network.

== History ==
From its debut on February 4, 2002, to October 4, 2013, the program was broadcast live out of Fox News' Washington studio each weekday at 10:00 p.m. ET and replayed at 1:00 a.m. ET. On October 7, 2013, the show began airing weekdays at 7:00 p.m. ET, replacing the weeknight editions of the Fox Report.

On September 6, 2016, Greta Van Susteren announced that she would be leaving Fox News. Fox News senior political analyst Brit Hume was named as the interim host of the show for the rest of the 2016 election cycle. The program aired its final episode, with Hume as host, on election eve, November 7, 2016. On Thursday and Friday, to finish the week, On the Record was hosted by two final guest hosts, Martha MacCallum and Ed Henry, with Friday, November 11, 2016, being the last On the Record. The vacated 7:00 p.m. time slot was replaced on November 14, 2016, by a new Fox News show, Tucker Carlson Tonight, hosted by the former Fox and Friends weekend host, Tucker Carlson. On January 9, 2017, the show was moved to the 9pm time slot following the departure of Megyn Kelly from Fox News Channel to NBC News, which ended her FNC show, The Kelly File.

On January 5, 2017, the competing cable news network, MSNBC, announced that Van Susteren would begin hosting a new show on January 9, 2017, for the network entitled For the Record with Greta, which aired on weekdays at 6:00 p.m. EST.

In June 2022, Van Susteren revived the concept as The Record with Greta Van Susteren for Newsmax TV.

== Major interviews ==
While host Van Susteren, a lawyer with an extensive background in law (including years teaching as an adjunct professor at Georgetown Law School), covered political issues, conducting major interviews with people such as former presidents George H. W. Bush, Bill Clinton and George W. Bush, as well as traveling overseas with the White House. Henry Kissinger was often asked to comment on the most important recent events. She traveled to Alaska several times and interviewed the former Governor, Sarah Palin. She has interviewed Rush Limbaugh by phone. Democrats she interviewed included former President Bill Clinton in 2008 as well as the US Secretary of State Hillary Clinton in both 2009 and 2013.

== Criticism ==
In late 2005, there was considerable coverage by On the Record of the Natalee Holloway affair. As the year wore on, coverage of the story moved from the actual case to Beth Holloway-Twitty's endeavors. The story brought On the Record its highest ratings to date, keeping the story going, though essentially no new information came to light. This coverage was labeled "missing white woman syndrome".

== See also ==
- For the Record with Greta

Preceded by Special Report with Bret Baier; Hannity (replay)	Fox News Channel Weekday Lineup; 7 PM ET - 8 PM ET; 2 AM ET - 3 AM ET	Succeeded by The O'Reilly Factor; Red Eye
