= Reckord =

Reckord is an English surname. Notable people with the surname include:

- Barry Reckord (1926–2011), Jamaican playwright
- Jamie Reckord (born 1992), English footballer
- Lloyd Reckord (1929–2015), Jamaican actor
- Milton Reckord (1879–1975), United States Army general

== See also ==
- Record (surname)
