= Record (surname) =

Record is an English surname. Notable people with this surname include:

- Eugene Record (1940–2005), American soul singer, original member of The Chi-Lites
- Samuel J. Record (1881–1945), American botanist
- Taylor I. Record (1846-1912), American politician

== See also ==
- Reckord
