= Sea Dog Table =

One of the treasures of Hardwick Hall

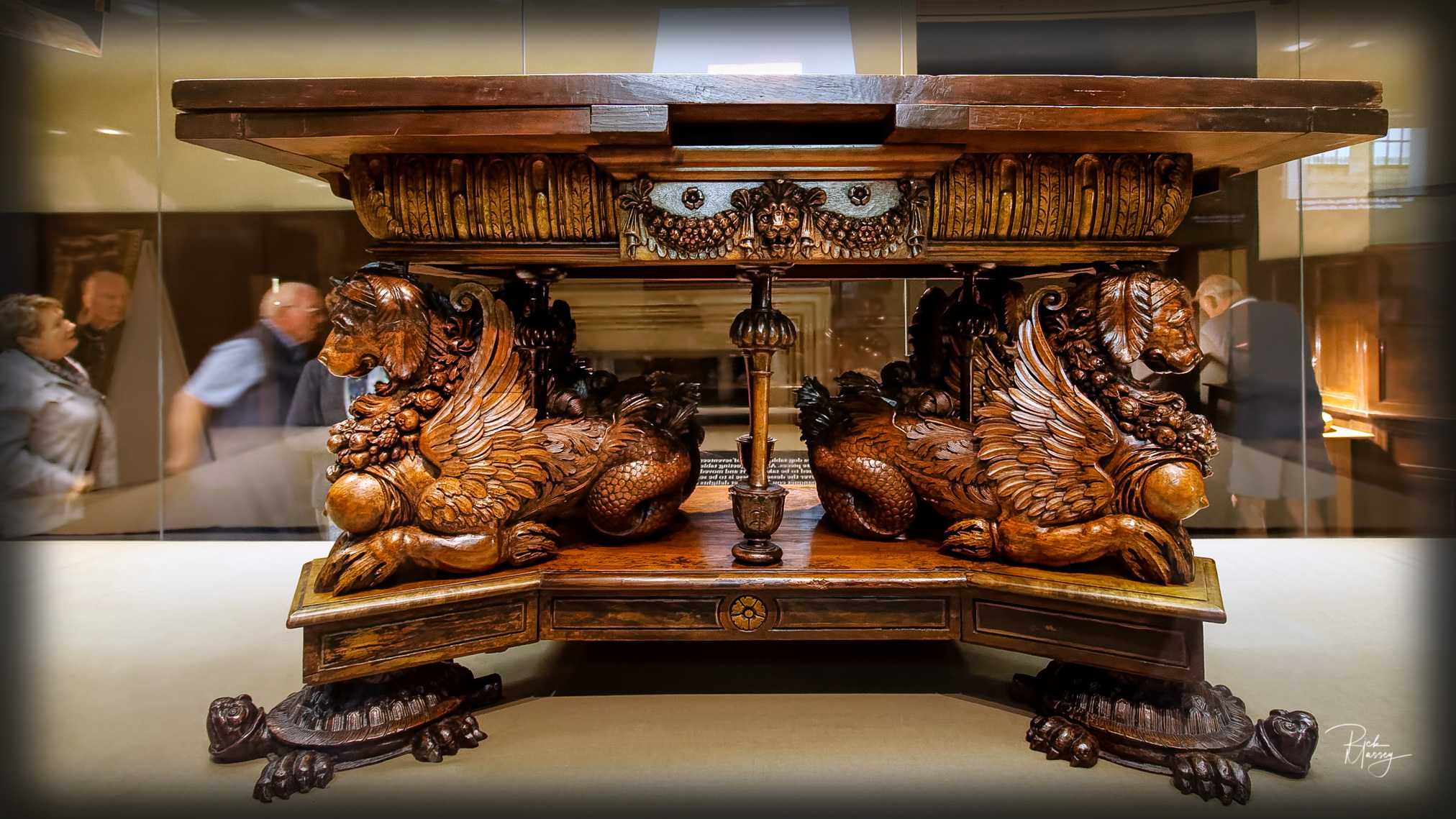
- Year: 1570s (Julian)
- Medium: walnut wood
- Dimensions: 85 cm (33 in) × 147 cm (58 in)
- Location: Hardwick Hall, United Kingdom

The Sea Dog Table is one of the treasures of Hardwick Hall, along with the Eglantine Table. It is an elaborately carved table from around 1570 or 1575, made in Paris, following a design by Jacques Androuet du Cerceau. It is regarded as one of the most important examples of 16th-century furniture in Britain.

The table is mainly made of inlaid walnut, with "gilding, fruitwood, tulipwood, and marble" also used. The 'sea dogs' of its name are four fantastical chimera, that support the table top above the stretcher. These have dog's heads, human breasts, front legs with paws, but the lower body of fish. The base rests on tortoises or turtles. The table expands, the leaves otherwise being tucked under the main tabletop, in a style still seen in 20th-century tables.

The table is the subject of some legendary anecdotes concerning the Cavendish family. There are doubtful stories that it may have been a possession of Queen Elizabeth I or Mary Queen of Scots.
