= For the Record (book) =

Memoir by David Cameron

- Front cover of the first edition
- Author: David Cameron
- Audio read by: David Cameron
- Language: English
- Genre: Memoir
- Published: 19 September 2019
- Publisher: William Collins
- Publication place: United Kingdom
- Pages: 752
- ISBN: 0-008-23928-2

For the Record is a memoir by former British Prime Minister David Cameron, published by William Collins, an imprint of HarperCollins UK, on 19 September 2019. It gives an insight into his life at 10 Downing Street, as well as inside explanations of the decisions taken by his government.

== History ==
It was reported that Cameron signed an £800,000 contract with HarperCollins UK in 2016 for the rights to the publication of a 'frank' account of his time in Downing Street. The autobiography was initially planned to be released in 2018, but was delayed so that Cameron would not be seen as a "backseat driver" in Theresa May's handling of Brexit. In April 2017, Cameron revealed that he had purchased a £25,000 designer garden shed to write in. The book was published in September 2019 shortly before the Conservative Party Conference.

== Synopsis ==
Cameron said that his aim in writing the book was to "correct the record" where he thought it was wrong. It covers his decision to call the 2016 referendum on the UK's European Union membership and its outcome, which led him to quit as Prime Minister and as MP for Witney two months later. It also describes the Scottish independence referendum and his reforms to economy, welfare and education. His controversial foreign policy is mentioned, as is the 2013 legalisation of same-sex marriage under his government.

The book addresses the effects of the severe epilepsy and cerebral palsy suffered by Cameron's son Ivan who died at the age of six. For the Record is dedicated to Cameron's wife Samantha.

William Collins' overview said that Cameron gives "for the first time, his perspective on the EU referendum and his views on the future of Britain's place in the world in the light of Brexit".

== Publication ==
Cameron was interviewed by News at Ten presenter Tom Bradby in The Cameron Interview on 16 September. ITV said the interview was watched by an average of 3 million viewers. Excerpts of For the Record were published in The Times in the week before the book's release and Cameron became the final interview for outgoing BBC Radio 4 Today presenter John Humphrys.

For the Record was published in the UK on 19 September 2019, with The Bookseller writing that all author profits from the £25 hardback would go to charity. It was published in the United States on 24 September, and in e-book and audio with Cameron reading the audiobook himself. HarperCollins Publishers retained the book's world rights.

20,792 copies of For the Record were sold in its first week on sale, placing it second to Margaret Atwood's The Testaments in the book charts.

== Reception ==
Writing in the newspaper i, James Hanning, a biographer of Cameron, said "his book displays all the sensitivity and communication skills he showed in office... Cameron is said to have not enjoyed writing this book, but it doesn't feel that way. Despite its demands, he gives every sense of having enjoyed office. Until June 2016, that is."

John Rentoul, the chief political commentator for The Independent, compared the book to Tony Blair's memoir, A Journey, and said "Cameron makes his case with style. The book is easy to read, with some nice self-deprecating touches."

The Telegraph called the book "well-written and lucid" and said "To Cameron's great credit, the importance of family shines throughout this book... He details a patrician, gilded, almost Edwardian upbringing, growing up in a Berkshire rectory with a nanny, boarding school at the age of seven, Eton, Oxford. He married a beautiful and supportive wife, their happiness shaken by the birth of a disabled son Ivan, who died aged six. His account of that tragedy is heartbreaking."

The Guardian's Jonathan Freedland said that the book "reminds you why Cameron dominated British politics for so long. The prose is, like him, smooth and efficient. There are welcome splashes of colour."

In The Telegraph, Allison Pearson called it "an exhaustive (and exhausting) case for the defence", in which "the author is like a driver who, in a moment of madness, caused an almighty pile-up and tries to convince a jury to go easy on him, offering plentiful evidence of previous good conduct."

Writing in the Evening Standard, editor (and former Chancellor of the Exchequer under Cameron) George Osborne found it to be "one of the very best" political memoirs, saying "His book has been so hard for him to write. It's been a kind of purgatory for him, motivated by a sense of duty that Prime Ministers should explain why they did what they did, for the record. It's why it is so good." He clarified "I'm not neutral as Cameron is my friend."

In The Times, Robert Harris called the book "a traditional exercise in self-justification" and said that its publication "could hardly be worse timed. It is as if Stanley Baldwin, another quintessential Tory leader, had published his memoirs at the height of the Blitz."
