= Recorder =

Recorder or The Recorder may refer to:

== Newspapers ==
- Indianapolis Recorder, a weekly newspaper
- The Recorder (Massachusetts newspaper), a daily newspaper published in Greenfield, Massachusetts, US
- The Recorder (Port Pirie), a newspaper in Port Pirie, South Australia
- The Amsterdam Recorder, an American daily newspaper acquired by The Daily Gazette
- The Recorder, a Central Connecticut State University student newspaper
- The Recorder, a San Francisco legal newspaper published by American Lawyer Media
- The Recorder & Times, a Canadian daily newspaper

== Periodicals ==
- The Recorder, a rail transport periodical published by the Australian Railway Historical Society
- The Recorder, the journal of the American Irish Historical Society

== Offices ==
- Recorder (Bible)
- Recorder (judge), a part-time municipal judge, or the highest appointed legal officer of some local area
- Recorder, a clerk who records, or processes records
- Court recorder, or court reporter
- Recorder of deeds, a government office tasked with maintaining public records and documents

== Other ==
- Recorder (musical instrument), a woodwind musical instrument in the flute family
- Recorder (comics), a fictional race of androids in some Marvel Comics
- Recorder: The Marion Stokes Project, a 2019 documentary about a video archivist

== See also ==
- Record (disambiguation)
