= The Woman in Black (Hill novel) =

1983 novel by Susan Hill

- First edition
- Author: Susan Hill
- Cover artist: John Lawrence
- Language: English
- Genre: Ghost story, horror novel
- Publisher: Hamish Hamilton
- Publication date: 10 October 1983
- Publication place: United Kingdom
- Pages: 200
- ISBN: 0-241-10987-6
- OCLC: 59164977
- Website: Archive

The Woman in Black is a 1983 gothic horror novel by English writer Susan Hill about a mysterious spectre that haunts a small English town. A television film adaptation with a screenplay by Nigel Kneale, was produced in 1989. In 2012, another film adaptation was released starring Daniel Radcliffe.

The book has also been adapted into a stage play by Stephen Mallatratt. The original London production ran 13,232 performances and is the second longest-running play in the history of the West End, after The Mousetrap.

Hill has acknowledged that the story was inspired by Henry James's novella The Turn Of The Screw, in particular the following description of the drowned governess:

"...a figure of quite as unmistakable horror and evil: a woman in black, pale and dreadful — with such an air also, and such a face! — on the other side of the lake."

== Plot summary ==
During Christmas, solicitor Arthur Kipps' stepchildren from his second marriage ask him to tell a ghost story. Arthur is agitated by the question, but decides to write his recollections of a case from his youth in the hope that doing so will exorcise them from his memory.

Years earlier, while a junior solicitor, Kipps is summoned to Crythin Gifford, a small market town on the northeast coast of England, to attend the funeral of Mrs. Alice Drablow and settle her estate. He is reluctant to leave his fiancée, Stella, but eager to get away from the dreary London fog. The late Mrs. Drablow was an elderly, reclusive widow who lived alone in the desolate and secluded Eel Marsh House. On the train ride there, he meets Samuel Daily, a wealthy landowner.

At the funeral, Kipps sees a woman with a pale face and dark eyes dressed in black. He observes a group of children silently watching the woman.

When a local coachman takes Kipps to the Eel Marsh House, he learns that it is a tidal island joined to the mainland by Nine Lives Causeway. At high tide the causeway is submerged; the house is surrounded by marshes and sea frets.

As Kipps sorts through Mrs. Drablow's papers at Eel Marsh House, he endures an increasingly terrifying sequence of unexplained noises, chilling events and appearances by the Woman in Black. In one of these instances, he hears the sound of a horse and carriage in distress, followed by the screams of a young child and his maid, coming from the direction of the marshes.

Most of the people in Crythin Gifford are reluctant to reveal information about Mrs. Drablow and the mysterious woman in black. Any attempts Kipps makes to learn more causes pained and fearful reactions. After confronting Samuel Daily, he learns that Mrs. Drablow's sister, Jennet Humfrye, gave birth to a child, Nathaniel. Because she was unmarried, she was forced to give the child to her sister. The Drablows adopted the boy, and insisted that he should never know that Jennet was his mother. Jennet went away for a year. Upon realising she could not be parted for long from her son, she made an agreement to stay at Eel Marsh House with him as long as she never revealed her true identity to him. She secretly planned to abscond from the house with her son. One day, a pony and trap carrying the boy across the causeway became lost and sank into the marshes, killing all aboard, while Jennet looked on helplessly from the window. The child's screams that Kipps heard were those of Nathaniel's ghost.

After Jennet died, she returned to haunt Eel Marsh House and the town of Crythin Gifford as the malevolent Woman in Black. According to local tales, a sighting of the Woman in Black presaged the death of a child.

Kipps returns to London, putting the events at Crythin Gifford behind him by marrying Stella and having a child of his own. One year later, at a fair, while his wife and child are enjoying a pony and trap ride, Kipps sees the Woman in Black. She steps out in front of the horse and startles it, causing it to bolt and wreck the carriage against a tree, killing the child instantly and critically injuring Stella, who dies ten months later. Kipps finishes his reminiscence with the words, "They have asked for my story. I have told it. Enough."

== Stage play ==
The play of The Woman in Black was adapted by Stephen Mallatratt in December 1987 and started off as a low budget production for the new Christmas play in Scarborough. It turned out to be so successful that it arrived in London's West End 13 months later in January 1989, taking up residence at the London Fortune Theatre on 7 June that same year. It is currently the second longest-running play in the West End. For the 30th Anniversary year the West End cast from May 2018-March 2019 was Richard Hope as Arthur Kipps and Mark Hawkins as the Actor, then from 19 March 2019 Stuart Fox with Matthew Spencer. As of November 2022, Julian Forsyth played Arthur Kipps with Matthew Spencer still playing the Actor. The 33-yearlong run at The Fortune Theater ended on March 4, 2023. Mallatratt's version sees Arthur rehearsing with an actor in an attempt to perform the story to family and friends, which allows him to relive the haunting of Eel Marsh House as a play within a play.

== Radio, television, and film adaptations ==
- In 1989, the story was adapted for television by Nigel Kneale for Britain's ITV network and directed by Herbert Wise. The production starred Adrian Rawlins as Arthur Kidd (not Kipps), Bernard Hepton as Sam Toovey (not Sam Daily) and Pauline Moran as The Woman in Black.
- In December 1993, BBC Radio 5 broadcast a four-part adaptation of the novel, starring Robert Glenister (as young Arthur Kipps) and John Woodvine (as an old Arthur Kipps, who also narrates parts of the story), and directed by Chris Wallis.
- In October 2004, BBC Radio 4 broadcast a 56-minute version in its Saturday Play slot, adapted by Mike Walker. It starred James D'Arcy as Arthur Kipps, was directed by John Taylor and was a Fiction Factory production.
- In February 2012, a film adaptation was released, starring Daniel Radcliffe as Arthur Kipps, and directed by James Watkins. It is a separate adaptation of the novel, not a remake of the 1989 film, and develops a storyline quite different from that of the source material.

== UK National Curriculum ==
Front cover of the 2016 paperback edition, used in British schools. Published by Vintage books. Designed by Jamie Clarke

The Woman in Black is commonly used as a set text in British schools as part of the National Curriculum for English. The book is recommended for Key Stage 3 and above with the paperback edition most frequently used by students. The novel is the subject of GCSE English Literature questions from the Edexcel and Eduqas examination boards.

== Sequel ==
A sequel to the book, The Woman in Black: Angel of Death, written by Martyn Waites, was first published in the United Kingdom on 24 October 2013, and in the United States on 12 February 2014. It was made into the 2015 film The Woman in Black: Angel of Death.
