= The Woman in Black: Angel of Death =

2014 film by Tom Harper

- Theatrical release poster
- Directed by: Tom Harper
- Screenplay by: Jon Croker
- Story by: Susan Hill
- Produced by: Richard Jackson; Simon Oakes; Ben Holden; Tobin Armbrust
- Starring: Phoebe Fox; Jeremy Irvine; Helen McCrory; Adrian Rawlins; Leanne Best; Ned Dennehy
- Cinematography: George Steel
- Edited by: Mark Eckersley
- Music by: Marco Beltrami; Marcus Trumpp; Brandon Roberts
- Production companies: Relativity Media; Hammer Films; Entertainment One; Talisman Films; Exclusive Media (uncredited)
- Distributed by: Relativity Media (United States); Entertainment One (Canada and United Kingdom)
- Release dates: 30 December 2014 (Dubai premiere); 2 January 2015
- Running time: 98 minutes
- Countries: Canada; United Kingdom; United States
- Language: English
- Budget: $15 million
- Box office: $48.9 million

The Woman in Black: Angel of Death is a 2014 supernatural horror film directed by Tom Harper and starring Phoebe Fox, Jeremy Irvine, Helen McCrory, Adrian Rawlins, Leanne Best, and Ned Dennehy. The screenplay was written by Jon Croker from a story by Susan Hill. It is the sequel to the 2012 film The Woman in Black, and is produced by Hammer Film Productions and Entertainment One. During WWII, the London bombings force two schoolteachers to evacuate a group of children to the coastal village of Crythin Gifford. When the refugees take shelter at Eel Marsh House, one teacher, Eve Parkins, soon realizes they are not alone. Little does she know that what lives in the house is more sinister than what they were running from. The film had a premiere in Dubai on 30 December 2014.

== Plot ==
Thirty years after the events of The Woman in Black, Eve Parkins joins some of her schoolchildren and the school's headmistress, Jean Hogg, during the evacuation of children during the London Blitz. On a train journey to the isolated village of Crythin Gifford, Eve meets dashing RAF pilot Harry Burnstow, stationed at an airfield nearby. Eve is confronted at the village by a raving madman, Jacob, before he flees.

Eve and Jean disapprove of Eel Marsh House, the isolated manor on an island in the marshes where they've been billeted. Eve has a nightmare about giving up her baby when younger. She awakens to the sound of a rocking chair coming from the cellar, where she finds a woman dressed in back and a message scolding her for letting her child go. Edward, one of the children who has been mute since his parents died in the bombing, is bullied by two other children and sees the Woman in Black in the nursery. Edward has begun carrying a rotting doll with him. One of his bullies, Tom, is drawn out of the house by the Woman in Black and Eve finds his body on the beach tangled in barbed wire.

Eve later sees the Woman in Black in the nearby graveyard where Nathaniel Drablow lies. She chases the ghost to the beach, overcome by visions of Nathaniel's death. She returns to the house and investigates the story of the ghost with Harry, using an old recording made by Alice Drablow before her death at the hands of the Woman in Black. It is her sister, Jennet Humpfrye, the mother of Nathaniel, whom she adopted. Jennet is haunting them because of Nathaniel's premature death and is punishing Eve, in particular, for giving up her baby. Eve journeys to the abandoned village to confront Jacob, who is blind and unable to be killed by the ghost since he can't see her. She find him driven insane by the deaths of all the other children and, surrounded by the ghosts of the others, he tries to kill Eve.

Jean finds one of the girls under the Woman's spell, trying to strangle herself. The girl suffocates herself using a gas mask during an air raid. After this death, Harry takes them to his airfield, a decoy used to divert enemy bombers. Harry is the only man stationed there after being disgraced by a crash that left him the only survivor and forbidden from flying. Eve realizes the Woman has followed them. When Harry is looking for Edward, he sees a child figure inside a plane decoy which reveals itself to be a disfigured Tom, now a ghost. Edward flees and dies by walking into a fire basket. Eve realizes Edward is still alive at Eel Marsh House and that the Woman in Black wants her alone. She drives to the island and finds Edward walking into the marsh to drown himself where Nathaniel died. She pursues him, and by telling him to think of his mother, Edward overcomes Jennet's hold over him. He swims back toward Eve and they're dragged into the mud by the ghosts of Jennet's victims. Harry arrives and saves them before being dragged to his own death by the child ghosts.

Months later, Eve lives in London, having adopted Edward. Jennet Humpfrye appears when they leave their house to smash a picture of Harry and his crew.

== Cast ==
- Phoebe Fox as Eve Parkins
- Jeremy Irvine as Flying Officer Harry Burnstow
- Helen McCrory as Jean Hogg
- Adrian Rawlins as Dr Rhodes. Rawlins previously played the protagonist Arthur Kidd in the 1989 television adaptation of The Woman in Black.
- Leanne Best as Jennet Humfrye, the Woman in Black. Best took over from Liz White, who portrayed the title character in the 2012 film.
- Ned Dennehy as Jacob
- Oaklee Pendergast as Edward
- Jude Wright as Tom
- Amelia Pidgeon as Joyce
- Casper Allpress as Fraser
- Amelia Crouch as Flora
- Leilah de Meza as Ruby
- Alfie Simmons as Alfie
- Pip Pearce as James
- Eve Pearce as the voice of Alice Drablow, Jennet's sister

== Development ==
In April 2012, Hammer Films announced that there would be a sequel to The Woman in Black, titled The Woman in Black: Angel of Death. Originally, the official plot synopsis was different from that of the final film: "Seized by the government and converted into a military mental hospital during World War II, the sudden arrival of disturbed soldiers to Eel Marsh House has awoken its darkest inhabitant. Eve, a beautiful young nurse, is sent to the house to care for the patients but soon realises she must save them from more than their own demons. Despite Eve’s efforts to stop her, one by one they fall victim to the Woman in Black."

The screenplay was written by Jon Croker though the original novel's author, Susan Hill, was approached to help with the story. In October 2012, Tom Harper was announced as the film's director. In April 2013, it was announced that Jeremy Irvine will play the lead role. Rumours circulated that Daniel Radcliffe would briefly reprise his role from the first film but this never came to pass. Principal photography for the film began in early 2014.

== Film novelisation ==
On 18 October 2013, a novelisation of the film's screenplay was released by Hammer Books (Random House Publishing) in England. The novelisation was written by crime fiction author Martyn Waites, and critical reception for the book has been generally negative.

== Soundtrack ==
The soundtrack album was released on 30 December 2014 over the Indie label Varèse Sarabande Records.

== Release ==
=== Theatrical release ===
The movie was originally set to be released on 30 January 2015, but instead it was moved to 1 January 2015. It was released in Canada and the United States on 2 January 2015, then released in France on 14 January 2015 and in Russia on 15 January 2015.

=== Home media ===
The Woman in Black: Angel of Death was released on DVD and Blu-ray on 14 April 2015. The Blu-ray features the documentary "Pulling Back the Veil: The Woman in Black 2 – Angel of Death"

=== Critical response ===
On Rotten Tomatoes, the film holds a rating of 24%, based on 78 reviews, with an average rating of 4.5/10. The consensus reads, "The Woman in Black 2: Angel of Death is atmospheric and visually sharp, but it's short on tension and scares." Metacritic, which uses a weighted average, assigned a score of 42 out of 100, based on 23 critics, indicating "mixed or average reviews". Audiences polled by CinemaScore gave the film a grade of "C" on an A+ to F scale.

Olly Richards of Empire gave it 3 out of 5 and called it "A much bolder, braver horror sequel than most. Except for a wispy ending, it’s a match for the first."
