= Nicholas Nickleby (1977 TV series) =

- Genre: Historical drama
- Based on: Nicholas Nickleby by Charles Dickens
- Written by: Hugh Leonard
- Directed by: Christopher Barry
- Starring: Nigel Havers
- Country of origin: United Kingdom
- Original language: English
- No. of series: 1
- No. of episodes: 6

Production
- Producer: Barry Letts
- Production company: BBC

Original release
- Network: BBC One
- Release: 27 March – 1 May 1977

Nicholas Nickleby is a British six-part television adaptation that first aired on the BBC in 1977. It is based on the novel Nicholas Nickleby by Charles Dickens.

== Cast ==
- Nigel Havers as Nicholas Nickleby
- Peter Bourke as Smike
- Derek Godfrey as Ralph Nickleby
- Robert James as Newman Noggs
- Kate Nicholls as Kate Nickleby
- Hilary Mason as Mrs Nickleby
- Malcolm Reid as Mr Alfred Mantalini
- Derek Francis as Wackford Squeers
- Patricia Routledge as Madame Mantalini
- Patsy Smart as Miss La Creevy
- Anthony Ainley as Sir Mulberry Hawk
- Nigel Hughes as Lord Frederick Verisopht
- Denis Gilmore as Wackford Jnr
- Osmund Bullock as Snobb
- Raymond Mason as Charles Cheeryble
- David Griffin as Frankie Cheeryble
- Preston Lockwood as Tim Linkinwater
- Andrew McCulloch as John Browdie
- John Hewer as Edwin Cherryble
- Ron Pember as Mr Snawley
- Isabelle Amyes as Miss Fanny Squeers
- Hetty Baynes as Matilda Price
- Patricia Brake as Madeline Bray
- Edward Burnham as Mr Lillyvick
- Anne Ridler as Mrs. Squeers
- Mark Teale as Belling
- Pauline Moran as Miss Petowker
- Denis Edwards as Mr Walter Bray
- Freddie Jones as Mr Vincent Crummles
- Pauline Letts as Mrs Crummles
- Paul Curran as Arthur Gride
- Liz Smith as Peg Sliderskew

== Bibliography ==
- Michael Pointer. Charles Dickens on the Screen: The Film, Television, and Video Adaptations. Scarecrow Press, 1996.
