= Alex Marshall (actor and director) =

English actor and director

Alex Marshall (born 1945) is an English actress and director, who was most active from the 1960s to the 1980s.

She has acted and directed mostly on television, but has worked on stage in both careers.

== Work ==
Beginning her career as an actress, Marshall had many roles in theatre and television productions. In 1966, appeared on stage as Audrey Johnson in Countercrime, a play directed by Hugh Goldie, a production later recorded for television. From 1969 to 1974, she was a storyteller for BBC Television’s Jackanory. In 1970, she appeared on stage again, in Keep Out, Love in Progress by Walter Hall, taking the lead, opposite Robert Gillespie.

In the BBC serial of Jude the Obscure (1971), Marshall took the leading role of Arabella Donn, a pig-keeper’s daughter who seduces and marries Jude. Reviewing the production in Life, John Leonard found that “Alex Marshall as Arabella steals the series”.

Marshall abandoned her acting career in 1974, having made more than three hundred appearances on television over the previous ten years, to become a television director. She commented to Des Wilson, for an article in The Observer, that her income had arrived at £5,000 a year, but she was disillusioned. She explained:

“Actresses are passive objects waiting to be picked up by the profession and used... When you’re in work, you’re vitally important - to the play and the company. You’re served by makeup people and wardrobe people and treated like a valuable property. Then the play is finished and suddenly you’re on the dole. Most girls leave the profession because all their drive, ambition and real love of the theatre are beaten by the humiliation of the dole queue, and by rejection, and having to answer the question from friends and relatives that strikes like a spear through the heart – 'Are you working at the moment?‘“

In 1976, Marshall was researcher and script editor for Granada Television’s Crown Court and later went on to direct episodes of the show. In 1978 she directed Empire Road, a BBC Two weekly serial, and other directing work included episodes of Jackanory Playhouse, ITV Playhouse, BBC2 Play of the Week, and Play for Today. In his memoirs, the actor Norman Beaton recalled Marshall from their time together on Empire Road: "An attractive blonde, she had a disarming smile which concealed a will of iron."

In 1989, Marshall directed a London stage production of Peter King's The Health Farm.

=== Television appearances ===
- Z-Cars: The Whizzers (1963) as Stenographer
- Crossroads (1965) as Christine Fuller
- Dixon of Dock Green: The Hunt for June Fletcher (1966) as Girl in club
- ITV Playhouse: Countercrime (1968) as Audrey Johnson
- ITV Sunday Night Theatre: Better Dead (1969) as Mollie
- Jackanory (1969–1974) as Storyteller
- Morning Story (1970) as Mrs Allan
- Whom God Hath Joined (1970) as Renee Souchon
- Jude the Obscure (1971) as Arabella Donn
- Budgie: Brief Encounter (1971) as Fiona
- Coronation Street (Yvonne Chappell, 11 episodes, 1971)
- On the Buses (1971) as Beryl
- Play for Today The House on Highbury Hill (1972) as Marigold
- New Scotland Yard (1972) as Denise Wright
- Thirty-Minute Theatre Attocity (1973) as Miss Miles
- Then and Now: Tigers Are Better Looking (1973) as Heather

=== Television as director ===
- Jackanory Playhouse: Princess Griselda’s Birthday Gift (1978)
- Crown Court (1978–1979)
- Empire Road, weekly serial, 1978
- BBC2 Play of the Week: The Turkey Who Lives on the Hill (1978)
- ITV Playhouse (1980)
- Play for Today (1982)
