= Jude the Obscure (serial) =

- Based on: Jude the Obscure by Thomas Hardy
- Written by: Harry Green
- Directed by: Hugh David
- Starring: Robert Powell; Fiona Walker; Alex Marshall
- Country of origin: United Kingdom
- Original language: English
- No. of episodes: 6

Production
- Producer: Martin Lisemore
- Running time: 270 minutes

Original release
- Network: BBC Two
- Release: 6 February – 13 March 1971

Jude the Obscure is a British television serial directed by Hugh David, starring Robert Powell, Fiona Walker, and Alex Marshall, first broadcast on BBC Television in early 1971. It is based on Thomas Hardy's novel Jude the Obscure (1895).

== Plot ==
The action is set in England in the late 19th century. Jude Fawley (Robert Powell) is a young stonemason’s apprentice living in the village of Marygreen with his Aunt Drusilla. His former schoolmaster, Richard Phillotson (John Franklyn-Robbins) leaves the village to take up a college appointment in Christminster, a university city based on Oxford. Jude has the ambition to study at Christminster and become a clergyman and is learning Greek and Latin. Meanwhile, he is seduced by Arabella Donn (Alex Marshall), a pig-keeper’s daughter, whom he marries when she claims to be pregnant. Arabella leaves him and emigrates to Australia. Jude then completes his apprenticeship and moves to Christminster, where he works as a mason, hoping to enter the university, but he is turned down for admission by the dean of Cardinal College. He meets and falls in love with his cousin, Sue Bridehead (Fiona Walker), but she marries Phillotson. However, Phillotson later allows Sue to live with Jude.

Arabella returns, and Jude divorces her, and Sue also gets a divorce from Phillotson. But Arabella has brought with her a son of Jude's, born after she left him, and sends Young Jude to live with his father. Jude and Sue have two small children of their own and are expecting a third, but are being ostracised for living together unmarried. Jude is sacked, and the family moves from town to town in search of work. Young Jude believes the children are the source of these troubles, murders Sue's two children, and hangs himself, leaving a suicide note. Sue then has a miscarriage. She comes to believe she is being punished by God for leaving her husband, so she returns to him. Jude, heartbroken, remarries Arabella, but he makes a final visit to Sue in freezing weather, is taken ill, and dies, aged only thirty. Sue is left to an unhappy life with Phillotson.

== Episodes ==
The six episodes are titled:

1. At Marygreen
2. To Christminster
3. To Melchester
4. To Shaston
5. To Aldbrickham
6. Christminster Again

== Reception ==
The serial was first broadcast in Britain on BBC Two between 6 February and 13 March 1971, in six 45-minute episodes, and then in the US on Masterpiece Theatre from 3 October to 7 November 1971. In Britain, it appeared on Saturday evenings from 9:35 to 10:20 p.m., thus timed to be kept away from younger children. The production was well received in Britain and the US and according to one critic "helped promulgate the British miniseries on PBS".

One reviewer described the serial as a dark production and especially pertinent in the context of recent reforms to divorce law.

John Leonard, writing in Life magazine as "Cyclops", noted "a surprising amount of sex, lots of bells, and bad weather". He considered that “an absorbing if not enthralling several hours of drama ... falls completely apart into silliness”, and that Alex Marshall as Arabella "steals the series".

== Home media ==
The production was issued on VHS video in 2000 by BBC/Warner and is also available on DVD.

== Cast ==
- Robert Powell as Jude Fawley
- Fiona Walker as Sue Bridehead
- Alex Marshall as Arabella Donn
- Daphne Heard as Aunt Drusilla Fawley
- John Franklyn-Robbins as Richard Phillotson
- Gwen Nelson as Mrs Edlin
- Sylvia Coleridge as Miss Fontover
- Carleton Hobbs as Dr Tetuphar
- Michael Golden as Tinker Taylor
- Anita Sharp-Bolster as Mrs Trott
- Mark Dignam as Vicar of Shaston
- Michael Rothwell as Dawlish
- Richard Beale as Chivers
- Beth Morris as Eliza, Phillotson’s maid
- Mary Wimbush as Miss Young
- George Woodbridge as Challow
- Michael Elwyn as Undergraduate
- John Scott Martin as Doctor
- Arnold Peters as Policeman
- Edwin Brown as Blacksmith
- Peter Welch as Policeman
- Mark Praid as Young Jude
- Jane Tucker as Sarah Blandford
- Eleanor Smale as Mrs Hawes
- Gladys Spencer as Mrs Baize
- John Moore as Willis
- Gary Rich as Juey
- Pamela Denton as Anny
- Hazel Coppen as Old Crone
- Meadows White as Stonemason
- Freda Bamford as Christminster publican
- Christopher Banks as college servant
- Owen Berry as Registrar
- Christopher Hodge as Auctioneer
- Sheila Fay as Landlady
- Ian Ricketts as Tavern customer
