= The Asphyx =

1972 film by Peter Newbrook

- Theatrical release poster
- Directed by: Peter Newbrook
- Screenplay by: Brian Comport
- Story by: Christina Beers; Laurence Beers
- Produced by: John Brittany
- Starring: Robert Stephens; Robert Powell; Jane Lapotaire; Alex Scott; Ralph Arliss; Fiona Walker
- Cinematography: Freddie Young
- Edited by: Maxine Julius
- Music by: Bill McGuffie
- Distributed by: Cinema Epoch; United Entertainment
- Release date: 1972
- Running time: 99 minutes
- Country: United Kingdom
- Language: English

The Asphyx, also known as Spirit of the Dead and The Horror of Death, is a 1972 British science fiction horror film directed by Peter Newbrook and starring Robert Stephens and Robert Powell.

Asphyx refers to the Ancient Greek word asphyxía, meaning "lack of pulse", or English asphyxiation.

== Plot ==
In Victorian England, philanthropic scientist Sir Hugo Cunningham is a member of a parapsychological society that studies psychic phenomena. As part of their latest investigation, the men have been photographing individuals at the moment of death. The resultant photos depict a strange smudge hovering around the body. Though the society concludes that they have captured evidence of the soul escaping the body, Cunningham is skeptical.

At a riverside party to celebrate his son's engagement, Cunningham is making home movies with a camera of his own invention when his son and the son's fiancée are killed in a boating accident. When Cunningham views the film, he sees that not only has he captured the blur, but that it is moving towards his son, and not away from him. Cunningham concludes that the blur is not the soul but a force known as an "asphyx", a kind of personal Grim Reaper, told of in Greek mythology, which comes for every individual at the moment of their death.

While filming a public execution, Cunningham activates a spotlight that he has crafted using phosphorus beneath a drip irrigation valve. Viewing the film with his adopted son and daughter's hopeful husband to be, Giles, Cunningham sees that the condemned man's asphyx was briefly held suspended in the spotlight's beam. Cunningham theorises that some property of the energy released by the combination of phosphorus and water renders the asphyx immobile. If correct, this would mean that an asphyx could be trapped, and that an individual would be immortal so long as their asphyx remained imprisoned.

Cunningham and Giles capture the asphyx of a dying guinea pig and seal it in the family tomb. Seeing immortality in his grasp, Cunningham tasks Giles with helping him to capture his own asphyx. Cunningham commissions the construction of an impenetrable vault door on his family tomb; once he has captured his asphyx, Giles is under instruction to seal the asphyx inside, so that no one can ever set it free. Using an electric chair to slowly kill himself, Cunningham summons his own asphyx. However, Giles is only experienced in capturing an asphyx with two men, and is forced to rely on his fiancée (and adoptive sister), Christina, for assistance. Christina is horrified with the experiments, but agrees to participate when Cunningham tells her that he will give his blessing for the two to marry if they allow him to make them immortal.

Theorising that imminent death, and not actual death, will summon an asphyx, Cunningham places Christina on a guillotine operated by Giles. During the experiment, the guinea pig chews through a hose pumping water onto the phosphorus stones being used to capture the asphyx. The equipment malfunctions and Christina is decapitated. Despondent, Cunningham insists that Giles open the vault and free his asphyx. Giles agrees, on the condition that Cunningham first grant him immortality. In fact Giles no longer wishes to live without his fiancée and, unbeknownst to Cunningham, he sabotages the equipment. As Cunningham attempts to gas Giles to death to summon his asphyx, he realises the equipment is not working, turns off the gas and turns on the oxygen to save Giles. Giles strikes a match, causing an explosion that kills him and destroys all of the equipment required to capture asphyxes.

Although Giles left behind the combination to the vault on a slip of paper, Cunningham destroys it, resolving that his own immortality is God's punishment for the deaths of Giles and Christina. In a framing sequence set in the 1970s, an ancient, disfigured Cunningham roams the streets of London with the guinea pig. He wanders into the path of a car collision, which kills both of the drivers. A police officer responding to the scene is shocked to find that Cunningham, crushed beneath the two vehicles, is still alive.

== Cast ==
- Robert Stephens as Sir Hugo Cunningham
- Robert Powell as Giles Cunningham
- Jane Lapotaire as Christina Cunningham
- Alex Scott as Sir Edward Barrett
- Ralph Arliss as Clive Cunningham
- Fiona Walker as Anna Wheatley
- Terry Scully as pauper
- John Lawrence as Mason
- David Grey as vicar
- Tony Caunter as warden
- Paul Bacon as 1st member

== Release ==
=== Home media ===
The Asphyx was released on DVD by Image Entertainment on 3 March 1998. It was later released by Anchor Bay Entertainment on 26 April 2004 and by Hen's Tooth Video on 27 October 2009. It was released on DVD and Blu-ray by Kino Video on 17 April 2012.

== Reception ==
The Monthly Film Bulletin wrote: "After a promising opening which involves some evocative glimpses of Victorian 'psychical research', The Asphyx soon changes course to become a very static account of Hugo's growing obsession with immortality. The film is not helped by Robert Stephens' highly theatrical Hugo, or by a script which abounds in clichés and facile explanations while relegating the invention of the cine-camera to a minor parenthesis. The rest of the cast cope as well as they can, with Robert Powell giving a characteristically authoritative performance as Giles, but the script eventually defeats them. The idea of the Asphyx – nicely visualised in the elaborate experiments as a writhing, screaming shadow – is never sufficiently developed to succeed in being exciting; and the film emerges as an unrewarding endurance test, periodically enlivened by some of the non-dialogue sequences."

Budd Wilkins from Slant Magazine awarded the film 3.5 out of 5 stars, writing, "Not quite a genre classic, The Asphyx is a mostly intriguing mashup of Victorian ghost story and steampunk revisionism that occasionally threatens to degenerate into inanity with its strident morality-play storyline and escalating improbability factor."

Brett Gallman from Oh the Horror gave the film a positive review, calling it "an old fashioned, cathartic tragedy with familial bloodshed, played in garish fashion and with the moralizing pathos of medieval drama."

Stuart Galbraith IV from DVD Talk awarded the film 3.5 out of 5 stars, praising the film's cinematography and lighting while criticizing its "clunky" dialogue, stagy blocking, and low budget.

Bob Brinkman from HorrorNews.net gave the film a positive review, saying it "conjures a feeling of existential angst as it wrestles with some of the darker philosophical thoughts of life, death, and immortality. With a twist towards the end of the story that is not a gimmick, but instead a well-turned bit of grief-filled misdirection, this is a must see for fans of gothic cinema."

TV Guide gave the film a mixed 2/5 stars, writing, "An unusual horror movie with an intriguing premise, The Asphyx is unfortunately marred by a weak script and unimaginative direction."

On Rotten Tomatoes, the film holds an approval rating of 67% based on 6 reviews, with a weighted average rating of 5/10.

== Legacy ==
On 30 October 2009, it was announced that Black & Blue Films was planning to shoot a remake of the movie. Slated to begin principal photography in early 2011, the new version was to star Alison Doody in the lead female role, and Matthew McGuchan in the director's seat. The remake failed to secure production finance and was indefinitely shelved, although Terry Rossio remade it as a short film called "Laboratory conditions".
