= Century (film) =

- Directed by: Stephen Poliakoff
- Written by: Stephen Poliakoff
- Produced by: Thomas Pickard; Thérèse Pickard
- Starring: Charles Dance; Clive Owen; Miranda Richardson; Robert Stephens
- Cinematography: Witold Stok
- Edited by: Michael Parkinson
- Music by: Michael Gibbs
- Release dates: 13 November 1993 (London Film Festival); 31 December 1993 (UK)
- Running time: 112 minutes
- Country: United Kingdom
- Language: English

Century is a 1993 British film, written and directed by playwright Stephen Poliakoff.

Clive Owen stars as a 19th-century Jewish doctor who, while studying at a research institute, discovers that an authoritative doctor (played by Charles Dance) is sterilizing innocent women. This features Mark Strong in his debut as a minor role.

== Cast ==
- Charles Dance as Professor Mandry
- Clive Owen as Paul Reisner
- Miranda Richardson as Clara
- Robert Stephens as Mr Reisner
- Joan Hickson as Mrs Whitweather
- Lena Headey as Miriam
- Neil Stuke as Felix
- Joseph Bennett as Edwin
- Fiona Walker as Mrs. Pritchard
- Ian Shaw as Meredith
- Mark Strong as Policeman

== Release ==
The film screened at the London Film Festival on 13 November 1993.
