= Preston Lockwood =

British actor (1912–1996)

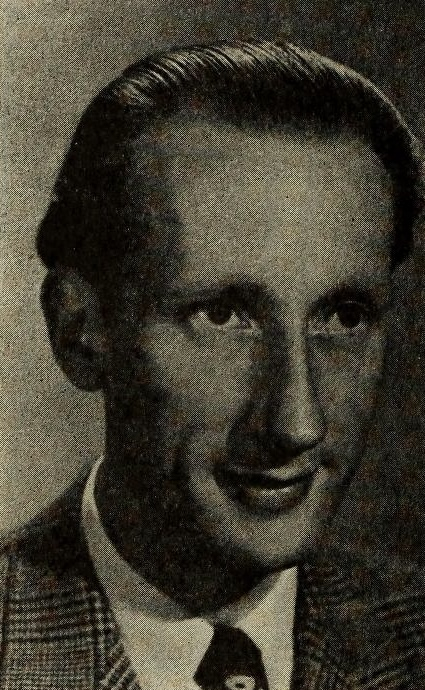
- Lockwood circa 1947
- Born: Reginald Herbert Lockwood; 30 October 1912; Essex, England
- Died: 24 April 1996 (aged 83); Middlesex, England
- Years active: 1958–1996
- Spouse: Gerda Benko (m. 1945)
- Children: 1

Reginald Herbert Lockwood (30 October 1912 – 24 April 1996), known professionally as Preston Lockwood, was an English radio and television actor.

The eldest son of bus driver Herbert Lewis Lockwood and his wife Ethel May (née Preston), Lockwood was born in Essex; he had two elder sisters, Sylvia (born 1908) and Phyllis (born 1909), and a younger brother, the violinist Ronald Lewis (born 18 October 1921). He used his mother's maiden name as his stage name.

His television credits include the role of Butterfield the butler in several episodes of Jeeves and Wooster.

Other appearances include The Ash Tree, Poldark, Shoestring, Keeping Up Appearances, Tenko, Miss Marple, (' At Bertram's Hotel ', episode), All Creatures Great and Small. Inspector Morse and the 1983 Doctor Who serial Snakedance.

His performances on BBC Radio include Dennis the Dachshund in Children's Hour's Toytown.

His later roles included Coriakin the magician in the 1989 BBC TV adaptation of The Voyage of the Dawn Treader, one of The Chronicles of Narnia. Two years before his death he appeared in the first episode of The Vicar of Dibley as Reverend Pottle, whose death midway through the service served as the catalyst for Geraldine Granger's (Dawn French) arrival.

Lockwood died from cancer on 24 April 1996. He had a humanist funeral ceremony, as he had requested.

== Filmography ==
Year	Title	Role	Notes
1970-1972	Kate	Mr. Winch	16 episodes
1970	Julius Caesar	Trebonius	Directed by Stuart Burge
1972	Lady Caroline Lamb	1st Partner	Uncredited
1972	Mistress of Hardwick	George Talbot, 6th Earl of Shrewsbury	10-part BBC One drama
1973	The Best Pair of Legs in the Business	3rd Chemist	
1974	The Black Windmill	Ilkeston	
1974	Ransom	Brigadier Hislop	
1977	Crossed Swords	Father Andrew	Originally released in UK as The Prince and the Pauper
1977	Nicholas Nickleby	Tim Linkinwater	3 episodes
1978	Absolution	Father Hibbert	
1978	Clouds of Glory	Dr. Carr	Miniseries directed by Ken Russell
1979	The Danedyke Mystery	Dr. Henry Simmonds	5 episodes
1979	Shoestring	Stephen Steele	Episode: "I'm a Believer"
1981	Time Bandits	Neguy	
1981	Winston Churchill: The Wilderness Years	Austen Chamberlain	Episode: "His Own Funeral"
1983	Number 10	Major General Sir Borlase Childs	Episode: "Underdog"
1983	Jemima Shore Investigates	Samuel Pedlar	Episode: "The Damask Collection"
1983	Doctor Who	Dojjen	Episode: "Snakedance: Parts: One, Three and Four"
1983	The Pirates of Penzance	Orchestra conductor	
1984	Scandalous	Leslie	
1984	Electric Dreams	Man at Concert	
1984	Tenko	Stephen Wentworth	
1985	Tenko Reunion	Stephen Wentworth	
1986	Room at the Bottom	1st BBC director	Episode: "Winter Schedule"
1987	At Bertram's Hotel	Canon Pennyfather	Episode Miss Marple (TV series)
1988	Consuming Passions	Josiah	
1988	High Spirits	Great Uncle Peter	
1988	The Girl in a Swing	Man at Sothebys	
1988	Pulse Pounders	Merlin	Dungeonmaster 2 sequence
1988	The Chronicles of Narnia	Coriakin	Episode: "The Voyage of the Dawn Treader: Part Three"
1988	Crossbow	Duke of Westphalia	Episode: "The Electors"
1989	The Lady and the Highwayman	Vicar	TV movie
1990	The Fool	Mr Benjamin	
1990	Blood Royal: William the Conqueror	Prior Lanfranc	TV film
1991	Rumpole of the Bailey	Lord Chancellor	Episode: "Rumpole and the Summer of Discontent"
1992	Inspector Morse	College Chaplain	Episode: "Absolute Conviction"
1993	Agatha Christie's Poirot	Francois	Episode: "The Chocolate Box"
1993	Jeeves and Wooster	Butterfield	2 episodes
1994	The House of Windsor	Ambrose Stebbings	TV series, 6 episodes
1994	The Vicar of Dibley	Vicar Pottle	Episode: "The Arrival"
1994	Keeping Up Appearances	Mr Mawsby	Episode: "Angel Gabriel Blue"
