= Robert Stephens =

English actor (1931–1995)

Sir Robert Stephens
- Born: Robert Graham Stephens; 14 July 1931; Bristol, England
- Died: 12 November 1995 (aged 64); London, England
- Occupation: Actor
- Years active: 1951–1995
- Spouses: Nora Ann Simmonds (m. 1951; div. 1952); Tarn Bassett (m. 1956; div. 1967); Maggie Smith (m. 1967; div. 1975); Patricia Quinn (m. 1995)
- Children: 4, including Chris Larkin and Toby Stephens

Sir Robert Graham Stephens (14 July 1931 – 12 November 1995) was an English actor in the early years of Britain's Royal National Theatre.

== Early life ==
Robert Graham Stephens was born on 14 July 1931 in Shirehampton, Bristol, the eldest of three children of shipyard labourer and costing surveyor Reuben Stephens (1905–1985) and chocolate-factory worker Gladys Millicent (née Deverill; 1906–1975). When aged 18, he won a scholarship to Esme Church's Bradford Civic Theatre School in Yorkshire, where he met his first wife Nora, a fellow student.

== Career ==
Stephens's first professional engagement was with the Caryl Jenner Mobile Theatre, which he followed in 1951 by a year of more challenging parts in repertory at the Royalty Theatre, Morecambe, followed by seasons of touring and at the Hippodrome, Preston. London director Tony Richardson saw a performance at the Royalty; this led to an offer of a place in the "momentous" first season of English Stage Company at the Royal Court in 1956.

Stephens appeared in two versions of Epitaph for George Dillon on Broadway during the 1958–59 season for which he received a nomination for the Tony Award for Best Actor in a Play.

Stephens's early films included A Taste of Honey (1961), Cleopatra (1963), and The Prime of Miss Jean Brodie (1969), with his then wife Maggie Smith. He also had a minor role as Prince Escalus in Franco Zeffirelli's Romeo and Juliet (1968), as well as a starring role in Billy Wilder's The Private Life of Sherlock Holmes (1970) and the gothic horror film The Asphyx (1972).

Stephens played Atahualpa in the original 1964 National Theatre production of The Royal Hunt of the Sun. He and Smith appeared together on stage and in film, notably in The Recruiting Officer at the Old Vic and the film version of The Prime of Miss Jean Brodie in 1969. However, following his departure from the National Theatre in 1970 and the break-up of their marriage in 1973, he suffered a career slump, not helped by heavy drinking and a breakdown.

Although Stephens continued to work on stage (notably in the National Theatre's The Mysteries in 1986), film (The Fruit Machine (1988), in 1988—titled Wonderland in the US—and Kenneth Branagh's Henry V), and television (notably in the role of Abner Brown in the 1984 BBC TV dramatisation of the children's classic The Box of Delights and as the Master of an Oxford college in an episode of Inspector Morse).

It was not until the 1990s that he re-established himself at the forefront of his profession, when the Royal Shakespeare Company invited him to play Falstaff in Henry IV for director Adrian Noble (opening April 1991), the title roles in Julius Caesar (director Steven Pimlott) later in the year and then King Lear, again for Noble, in May 1993. He was awarded the Laurence Olivier Theatre Award in 1993 for Best Actor, for his performance as Falstaff.

Stephens provided the voice of Aragorn in the 1981 BBC Radio serialisation of The Lord of the Rings. In 1985, he directed the British premiere production of Danny and the Deep Blue Sea by John Patrick Shanley at the Gate Theatre, London.

Stephens was knighted as a Knight Bachelor in the 1995 New Years Honours List "For services to Drama".

== Personal life and death ==
Stephens was married four times:

- 1951: to Nora Ann Simmons; they had one child and divorced in 1952
- 1956: to Tarn Bassett; they had one child and divorced in 1967
- 1967: to Maggie Smith; they had two sons, the actors Chris Larkin and Toby Stephens and divorced in 1975
- 1995: to Belfast-born Patricia Quinn

Following years of ill health, Stephens died on 12 November 1995, aged 64, due to complications during surgery, a little under a year after having been knighted.

== Filmography ==
=== Film ===
Year	Title	Role	Notes	Ref.
1956	War and Peace	Officer Talking with Natasha	Uncredited	
1960	Circle of Deception	Captain Stein		
1961	A Taste of Honey	Peter Smith		
1961	Pirates of Tortuga	Henry Morgan		
1961	The Queen's Guards	Henry Wynne-Walton		
1961	Lunch Hour	The Man		
1962	The Inspector	Roger Dickens	Released as Lisa in USA	
1963	The Small World of Sammy Lee	Gerry Sullivan		
1963	Cleopatra	Germanicus		
1966	Morgan – A Suitable Case for Treatment	Charles Napier		
1968	Romeo and Juliet	The Prince of Verona		
1969	The Prime of Miss Jean Brodie	Teddy Lloyd		
1970	The Private Life of Sherlock Holmes	Sherlock Holmes		
1972	The Asphyx	Sir Hugo Cunningham		
1972	Travels with My Aunt	Ercole Visconti		
1974	Luther	Johan Von Eck		
1977	The Duellists	General Treillard		
1977	At Night All Cats Are Crazy	Charles Watson		
1978	The Shout	Chief Medical Officer		
1981	The Games of Countess Dolingen	The Professor		
1983	Ill Fares the Land			
1986	Comrades	James Frampton		
1987	High Season	Konstantinis		
1987	Empire of the Sun	Mr. Lockwood		
1988	American Roulette	Screech		
1988	The Fruit Machine	Vincent		
1988	Ada in the Jungle	Lord Gordon		
1988	Testimony	Vsevolod Meyerhold		
1989	Henry V	Ancient Pistol		
1990	Wings of Fame	Merrick		
1990	The Bonfire of the Vanities	Sir Gerald Moore		
1990	The Children	Azariah Dobree		
1991	The Pope Must Die	The Camarlengo		
1991	30 Door Key	Prof. Pimco		
1991	Afraid of the Dark	Dan Burns		
1992	Chaplin	Ted the Drunk		
1993	Searching for Bobby Fischer	Poe's teacher		
1993	The Secret Rapture	Max Lopert		
1993	Century	Mr. Reisner		
1995	England, My England	John Dryden	(final film role)	

=== Television ===
Year	Title	Role	Notes
1956	Nom-de-Plume	John	Episode: The Counting House Clerk
1964	Channing	Paddy Riordan	Episode: A Bang and a Whimper
1964	First Night	Arnold Claybill	Episode: The Improbable Mr Claybill
1971	The Rivals of Sherlock Holmes	Max Carrados	Episode: The Missing Witness Sensation
1974	QB VII	Robert Highsmith	TV miniseries, 3 episodes
1976	Gangsters	Sir George Jeavons	2 episodes
1978	Holocaust	Uncle Kurt Dorf	TV miniseries, 4 episodes
1980	Lady Killers	Edward Marshall Hall	1 episode
1982	Anyone for Denis?	Schubert	TV movie
1983	Studio	Lyndsay	7 episodes
1984	The Box of Delights	Abner Brown	6 episodes, recurring role
1984	Fortunes of War	Bill Castlebar	3 episodes
1985	By the Sword Divided	Sir Ralph Winter	
1986	Hell's Bells	Bishop Godfrey Hethercote	6 episodes
1987	Inspector Morse	Sir Wilfred Mulryne	Episode: The Settling of the Sun
1988–1989	War and Remembrance	SS Sturmbannführer Karl Rahm	TV mini series, 3 episodes
1989	South Bank Show	Raymond Chandler	TV arts series, 1 episode, dramatised readings
1990	The Storyteller: Greek Myths	Hades	1 episode
1994–1995	99-1	Commander Oakwood	7 episodes

== See also ==
- List of actors in Royal Shakespeare Company productions
- List of British actors
- List of Royal National Theatre Company actors

== Bibliography ==
- Stephens, Robert; Coveney, Michael. (1995). Knight Errant. Hodder and Stoughton
- Stevens, Christopher. (2010). Born Brilliant: The Life of Kenneth Williams. John Murray
- McFarlane, Brian. (2005). The Encyclopaedia of British Film. Methuen, 2nd edition
