= Alison Plowden =

English historian and biographer

Alison Margaret Chichele Plowden (18 December 1931 – 17 August 2007) was an English historian and biographer well known for her popular non-fiction about the Tudor period.

== Early life and education ==
Plowden was born at Quetta in India, a descendant of Edmund Plowden and, collaterally, of Henry Chichele. Privately educated, she worked for the BBC as a script editor. She wrote the script for the television series Mistress of Hardwick (about Bess of Hardwick), which won her a Writers' Guild Award for the best educational television series, and several television plays, including Sweet England's Pride and The Case of Eliza Armstrong.

== Career ==
She later recalled: "A secretary writing scripts was a little like a performing monkey at the BBC - there was a sort of 'Fancy, what a clever little girl' attitude."

In 1970 she decided to leave the BBC to go freelance. Her first book, The Young Elizabeth (1972), was followed by Danger to Elizabeth (1973), Marriage With My Kingdom (1977), about Elizabeth's courtships, and Elizabeth Regina (1980), which presented the Queen at the height of her powers. Collectively these books became known as Alison Plowden's "Elizabethan Quartet". While working on this series she also published Tudor Women (1979). After the quartet she wrote Elizabethan England: Life in an Age of Adventure (1982). In addition she wrote many drama and other scripts for BBC radio between 1963 and 1988.

Later she turned her attention to the 19th century with The Young Victoria (1983) and Caroline and Charlotte (1989), then the Civil War period with The Stuart Princesses (1996), about the six princesses of the House of Stuart who lived through the violent upheavals of the 17th century. This was followed by Women All on Fire (1998), about the activities of women on both sides of the Civil War. One of these women was Queen Henrietta Maria, of whom she published a biography in 2001. She continued with In a Free Republic: Life in Cromwell's England (2006) and the last of her 25 books, The Winter Queen (about Elizabeth Stuart, wife of Frederick V, Elector Palatine who accepted the crown of Bohemia), published posthumously in 2008.

== Personal life ==
Plowden was devoted to animal welfare, and shared her home with two cats. She was unmarried.

== Works ==
- Young Elizabeth (1971)
- Mistress of Hardwick (1972: BBC television series and tie-in book)
- Danger to Elizabeth (1973)
- The Case of Eliza Armstrong: "A Child of 13 Bought for £5" (1974: BBC television series and tie-in book)
- The House of Tudor (1976)
- Marriage with My Kingdom: The Courtships of Queen Elizabeth I (1977)
- Tudor Women - Queens and Commoners (1979)
- Elizabeth Regina (1980)
- Young Victoria (1983)
- Two Queens in One Isle: The Deadly Relationship of Elizabeth I and Mary Queen of Scots (1984)
- Lady Jane Grey: Nine Days Queen (1985)
- Caroline and Charlotte (1989)
- The Elizabethan Secret Service (1991)
- The Stuart Princesses (1996)
- Women All on Fire: Women of the English Civil War (1998)
- Henrietta Maria: Charles I's Indomitable Queen (2001)
- In a Free Republic (2006)

== Sources ==
- Obituary in The Times
- Obituary in the Daily Telegraph
- Radio Plays
