= Susannah Wise =

English television and stage actress

Susannah Walker Wise
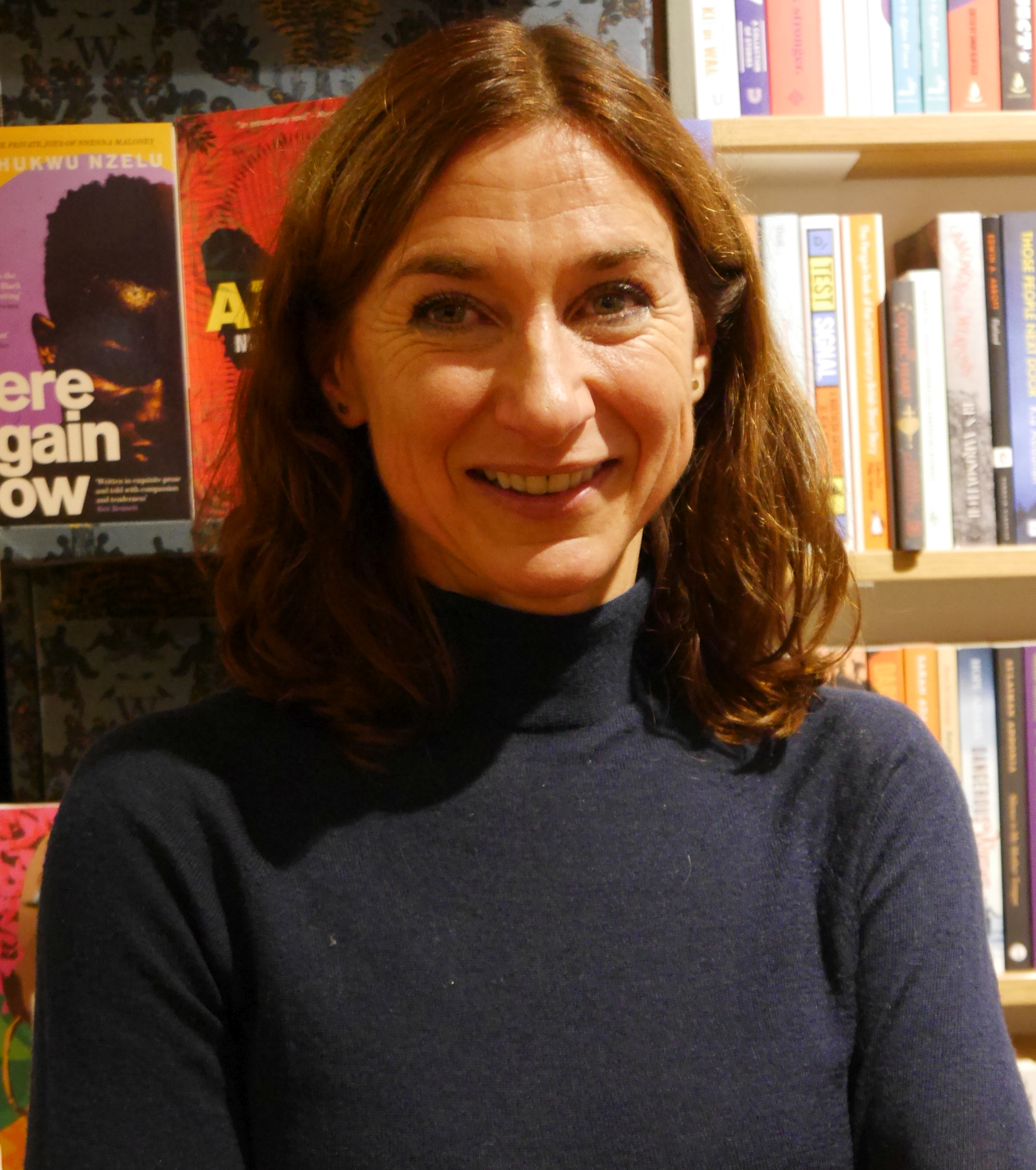
- Wise at Waterstones, London in 2023
- Occupation: Actress
- Parent(s): Herbert Wise (father); Fiona Walker (mother)

Susannah Walker Wise is an English television and stage actress.

== Life and career ==
Wise trained as an actress at the London Academy of Music and Dramatic Art, graduating in 1995. Wise is best known for her work in the soap opera EastEnders and the Channel 4 comedy Peep Show. On stage, she has had roles in Christopher Shinn's Where Do We Live and in Nina Raine's Rabbit. She also played Rebecca Shaw in the Channel 4 series Derek. She appeared in the final episode of Kavanagh QC, starring John Thaw, in 2001. In 2015 she portrayed Sylvie in the Mystery miniseries The Enfield Haunting. In 2020 she appeared as Emily Helmsley in Father Brown episode 8.10 "The Tower of Lost Souls".

=== Writing ===
Wise's debut novel This Fragile Earth was released in 2021, her second novel Okay Then That’s Great in 2022. Both books have been longlisted for the Mslexia prize.

== Filmography ==
=== Television ===
Year	Title	Role	Notes
1997	Where the Heart Is (British TV series)	Wendy Atkins	4 episodes
2001	Kavanagh QC	Alison Hatton	Final episode
2004	Midsomer Murders	Liz Francis	Season 7, The Straw Woman
2006	The IT Crowd	Samantha	Season 1, The Red Door
2008	EastEnders	Alice Grayling	
2008	Peep Show	Heather	Burgling
2013	Derek	Rebecca Shaw	1 episode
2013	PhoneShop	Shelley	
2015	The Enfield Haunting	Sylvie	Miniseries
2018	Call the Midwife	Hilary	
2018	Collateral	Inspector Shields	Miniseries
2018	Press	Wendy Bolt	Miniseries
2020	Roadkill	Jessie Coomer	Miniseries
2020	Father Brown	Emily Helmsley	
2020	The Split	Helen Parker	
2020	Trying	Denise	
