= The Woman in Black (2012 film) =

Film by James Watkins

- Theatrical release poster
- Directed by: James Watkins
- Screenplay by: Jane Goldman
- Based on: The Woman in Black by Susan Hill
- Produced by: Richard Jackson; Simon Oakes; Brian Oliver
- Starring: Daniel Radcliffe; Ciarán Hinds; Janet McTeer; Liz White
- Cinematography: Tim Maurice-Jones
- Edited by: Jon Harris
- Music by: Marco Beltrami
- Production companies: Alliance Films; Hammer Films; UK Film Council; Cross Creek Pictures; Talisman Films; Exclusive Media Group; Filmgate; Film i Väst
- Distributed by: Momentum Pictures (United Kingdom); CBS Films (United States); Alliance Films (Canada); Svensk Filmindustri (Sweden); Exclusive Media Group (Overseas)
- Release dates: 24 January 2012 (Royal Festival Hall); 3 February 2012 (North America); 10 February 2012 (United Kingdom); 27 April 2012 (Sweden)
- Running time: 95 minutes
- Countries: United Kingdom; United States; Sweden; Canada
- Language: English
- Budget: $15–17 million
- Box office: $129 million

The Woman in Black is a 2012 gothic horror film directed by James Watkins from a screenplay by Jane Goldman. It is the second adaptation of Susan Hill's 1983 novel of the same name, which was previously filmed in 1989. The film stars Daniel Radcliffe, Ciarán Hinds, Janet McTeer, Sophie Stuckey, and Liz White. The plot, set in early-20th-century England, follows a young recently widowed lawyer who travels to a remote village where he discovers that the vengeful ghost of a bereaved woman is terrorising the locals.

The film was produced by Hammer Film Productions, Alliance Films, Cross Creek Pictures and the UK Film Council. A film adaptation of Hill's novel was announced in 2009, with Goldman and Watkins attached to the project. During July 2010, Radcliffe was cast in the lead role of Arthur Kipps. The film was meant to be shot in 3D before those plans were scrapped. Principal photography took place from September to December 2010 across England. Post-production lasted until June 2011. Upon release in February 2012, the film attracted controversy after receiving a 12A classification from the British Board of Film Classification (BBFC), despite several cuts having been made to obtain this rating. The BBFC received 134 complaints from members of the general public, over the classification of the film.

The Woman in Black premiered at the Royal Festival Hall in London before being theatrically released in North America on 3 February 2012 by CBS Films and Alliance Films and in the United Kingdom on 10 February 2012 by Momentum Pictures. The film received generally positive reviews with critics praising Radcliffe's performance, cinematography, direction, atmosphere and homages to Hammer's gothic horror films, calling it a "solid ghost story". It was also commercially successful, grossing $130 million worldwide.

A sequel, The Woman in Black: Angel of Death, was released on 2 January 2015, without the involvement of Radcliffe, Watkins or Goldman.

== Plot ==
In Crythin Gifford village in 1889, three young girls playing in their nursery notice a presence in the room. Hypnotized and entranced, they jump to their deaths from the window.

In 1906, in Edwardian London, lawyer Arthur Kipps's wife, Stella, dies after giving birth to their son Joseph. Four years later, Arthur's firm sends him to Crythin Gifford to retrieve any documents left by Alice Drablow, the deceased owner of Eel Marsh House, an isolated and desolate marshland estate, before the house is sold. Upon arrival, Arthur finds the villagers cold and local solicitor Jerome unwelcoming, but wealthy landowner Samuel Daily is amiable.

At Eel Marsh House, Arthur is distracted by odd noises, a bolted nursery, and a spectral entity in black funerary garb. He also hears voices, a screaming child, and horse sounds coming from the marshes but sees no one on the causeway. He visits the village constable who dismisses his concerns. Two children enter the station with their sister Victoria, who has ingested lye, but she dies in Arthur's arms. The townspeople blame Arthur.

That night, Sam reveals that he and his wife, Elisabeth, lost their young son and his friend to drowning. Arthur later discovers Jerome's young daughter barricaded in the basement for her safety. She too believes him to be responsible for Victoria's death. Victoria's father later tearfully accuses him of seeing "that woman" at Eel Marsh. The townspeople angrily insist that Arthur leave.

Back at the house, Arthur uncovers documents and letters, revealing the Drablows' son, Nathaniel, was their bastard nephew, adopted from Alice's sister Jennet Humfrye after she was deemed mentally unfit to raise a child. Nathaniel later drowned in a carriage accident on the marsh, and Jennet blamed Alice for saving only herself and leaving the boy. Jennet hanged herself in the nursery, vowing never to forgive Alice. Arthur finds the nursery now unlocked. From the window, he watches in horror as a boy crawls out of the mud in the rain. Outside, he sees numerous dead children in the marshes, Victoria among them. Inside, he sees an apparition of a woman hanging herself.

In town the next day, Jerome's house catches fire. When Arthur attempts to save Jerome's daughter, he sees the Woman in Black goading the girl into burning herself. Elisabeth explains that the Woman in Black is Jennet, who claims the village children by having them take their own lives in penance for her own son being taken from her. Arthur realizes that Joseph, who is coming to Crythin Gifford that night, will be next.

In an attempt to lift the curse, Arthur and Sam recover Nathaniel's body in the marsh using Sam's car and place it in his nursery, into which Arthur entices Jennet. They then bury Nathaniel with Jennet, though her voice echoes that she will never forgive the wrongs she suffered. Assuming that she has been pacified, Arthur meets Joseph and his nanny at the station. The Woman in Black appears and lures Joseph onto the tracks. Arthur attempts to save him, but both he and Joseph are killed by an oncoming train. A horrified Sam sees the ghosts of all the village children standing with the Woman in Black.

Arthur and Joseph, now in the afterlife, see Stella in a peaceful and bright railway station. The family, reunited and safe from Jennet, disappear together into the light.

== Cast ==
- Daniel Radcliffe as Arthur Kipps, a young lawyer
- Ciarán Hinds as Samuel "Sam" Daily, local landowner
- Janet McTeer as Elisabeth Daily, Sam's wife
- Liz White as Jennet Humfrye, the "Woman in Black"
- Roger Allam as Mr. Bentley, a senior partner of Arthur's firm
- Tim McMullan as Jerome, the local solicitor
- James French as a background character in the street scene, the pub scene, the chocolate bar scene and more
- Jessica Raine as Joseph's nanny
- Daniel Cerqueira as Keckwick, the carriage driver
- Shaun Dooley as Fisher, village innkeeper
- Mary Stockley as Mrs Fisher
- David Burke as PC Collins, village constable
- Sophie Stuckey as Stella Kipps, Arthur's wife
- Misha Handley as Joseph Kipps, Arthur's son
- Aoife Doherty as Lucy Jerome, Jerome's daughter
- Victor McGuire as Gerald Hardy, a villager
- Alexia Osborne as Victoria Hardy, Hardy's daughter
- Alisa Khazanova as Alice Drablow
- Ashley Foster as Nathaniel Drablow, the Woman in Black's son
- Sidney Johnston as Nicholas Daily, Sam and Elisabeth's deceased son

Liz White's character is never referred to as "The Woman in Black" in the film nor during the credits, where she is listed as "Jennet".

== Production ==
=== Development ===
The film was announced in 2009, with Jane Goldman as screenwriter and later James Watkins as director. Daniel Radcliffe was announced as the actor playing the part of Arthur Kipps on 19 July 2010. Two months later, it was announced that Harry Potter and the Deathly Hallows – Part 2 co-star Ciarán Hinds would join Radcliffe along with Janet McTeer as Mr and Mrs Daily respectively. Before filming, Radcliffe saw a psychologist so he could better understand his character. The part of Joseph Kipps was played by Misha Handley, who is Radcliffe's real life godson.

=== Filming ===
The film was planned to be shot in 3D, but the idea was later scrapped. Principal photography officially started on 26 September 2010. The next day, Radcliffe was pictured in costume just outside Peterborough, England. In early October the crew was filming in Layer Marney Tower. Filming officially ended on 4 December 2010.

The exterior shots of Eel Marsh House were filmed at Cotterstock Hall near Oundle in central England. The fictional Nine Lives Causeway leading to it was filmed at Osea Island in Essex. The village of Crythin Gifford was filmed at Halton Gill, north of Settle in the Yorkshire Dales.

The shots at the train station were filmed along the Bluebell Railway in East Sussex.

=== Post-production ===
At the Kapow! Comic Con in London during April 2011, director James Watkins confirmed filming had been completed in December 2010 and post-production would go on until June 2011. For its British release, several changes were made in order to qualify for a 12A certificate. The distributor Momentum Pictures arranged to have six seconds cut and for changes to other shots, with some scenes darkened and the sound level reduced on some others.

Despite the cuts, the 12A certificate was seen as highly controversial in the United Kingdom, and the British Board of Film Classification received 134 complaints from individuals that the rating was too low, the most complained-about film of 2012 according to BBFC figures. A cinematic re-release in October 2014, including a short clip from the forthcoming sequel The Woman in Black: Angel of Death, was given a higher rating of 15.

=== Music ===
The soundtrack for the film was composed by American film composer Marco Beltrami. It received positive reviews and was released as a soundtrack album on 6 February 2012 by Silva Screen Records.

"G.G." by MUCC is the image song for the Japanese version.

== Release and reception ==
=== Critical reception ===
The Woman in Black was met with generally positive reviews from critics. On Rotten Tomatoes, the film holds a rating of 66%, based on 195 reviews, with an average rating of 6.10/10. The site's critical consensus states, "Traditional to a fault, The Woman in Black forwent gore for chills—although it may not provide enough of them for viewers attuned to modern, high-stakes horror." On Metacritic the film has a score of 62 out of 100, based on 40 critics, indicating "generally favorable reviews". Audiences polled by CinemaScore gave the film an average grade of "B–" on an A+ to F scale.

=== Box office ===
During opening weekend, The Woman in Black earned $20 million, the biggest US opening for a Hammer film in all of Hammer history, putting it at second place in the box office, behind Chronicle, which earned about $1 million more. This is significantly more than the $11–$16.5 million industry analysts predicted it would bring in. By June 2012, The Woman in Black had made $127.7 million worldwide. The film also became the highest-grossing British horror film in 20 years.

=== Home media ===
The film was released on DVD and Blu-ray Disc on 18 June 2012 in the United Kingdom, and was released in the United States on 22 May 2012.

== Sequel ==
In April 2012, Hammer Films announced that there would be a sequel to The Woman in Black, which is titled The Woman in Black: Angel of Death. The official plot synopsis is: "During World War II, the London bombings force schoolteachers Eve Parkins (Phoebe Fox) and Jean Hogg (Helen McCrory) to evacuate a group of children to Crythin Gifford. When the refugees take shelter at Eel Marsh House, Eve soon comes to realise that they are not alone. The longer they remain there, the more the house's evil spirit threatens the children. With the help of a pilot (Jeremy Irvine), Eve tries to protect the children and uncover the truth of the Woman in Black."

The original novel's author Susan Hill helped with the story, with the screenplay written by Jon Croker. In October 2012, Tom Harper was announced as the film's director. In April 2013, it was announced that Jeremy Irvine would play the lead role, with rumours that Daniel Radcliffe would briefly reprise his role from the first film, however Radcliffe ultimately did not appear in the sequel. It later was announced that Phoebe Fox and Helen McCrory had been cast in the film as well. The film began the shooting process in early 2014.

The film was released on 2 January 2015 to moderate box office returns but a generally negative critical response.
