= Bloedverwanten =

1977 film

- Directed by: Wim Lindner
- Written by: Belcampo (short story), John Brason (adaptation)
- Release date: 10 February 1977
- Running time: 97 minutes
- Country: Netherlands
- Language: Dutch

Bloedverwanten (Blood Relations) is a 1977 Dutch comedy film directed by Wim Lindner.

== Cast ==
- Sophie Deschamps ... Maria
- Maxim Hamel ... Dr. Julius Steiger
- Ralph Arliss... Peter Steiger
- Grégoire Aslan ... Rudolphe De Guys
- Eric Beekes... Jason
- Ronnie Bierman... Olive
- Eddie Constantine ... Priest
- Robert Dalban ... Mr. Zandvoort
- Frits Emmerik ... Vampire
- Simone Ettekoven ... Lydia Martin
- Jacqueline Huet ... Sister
- Wim Kouwenhoven ... Claude Martin
- Huib Rooymans ... Hugo
- Will Van Selst ... Dr. Liedke
- Elly Van Stekelenburg ... Gertrud Cornelius
