= Ralph Arliss =

British actor (born 1947)

- Born: Ralph Arliss Wanklyn James; 11 September 1947 (age 79); Watford, Hertfordshire, England
- Occupations: Actor, party member, charity trustee
- Spouse(s): Victoria Scott (m. 1978; div. 199?) Belinda Davison (m. 1993)
- Relatives: George Arliss (great uncle)

Ralph Arliss (born 11 September 1947) is a British actor, and the great-nephew of George Arliss.

== Career ==
Arliss began his career performing at Birmingham Rep before moving to television. His television credits include: Doctor Who (in the serial Planet of the Spiders), Z-Cars, Crown Court, The Sweeney, Survivors, Return of the Saint, Secret Army, Love for Lydia, Shoestring, Airline, The Jewel in the Crown, The Day Christ Died, A.D., Dempsey and Makepeace, Call Me Mister, Boon, Prime Suspect, Casualty and The Bill. He played the leading role of Kickalong in the ITV serial Quatermass opposite Sir John Mills in 1979.

His film appearances include roles in The Last Valley (1971), The Asphyx (1972), Deadly Strangers (1975), Blood Relations (1977) and Dead Man's Folly (1986).

== Politics and charity ==
He is involved in political training for the Green Party of England and Wales. In 2003, he was involved in a failed campaign to make Dorset a Genetically-Modified (GM) crop-free zone. Two years later, Arliss stood for the party in North Dorset, coming fifth with 2.1% of the vote.

Since 2012, Arliss has become involved with TRUSTchildren Support Group UK (set up following the 2004 Boxing Day tsunami to look after children in India affected by the disaster), being appointed trustee in 2015. Among his work includes opening a children's home in Tamil Nadu and planting trees with students in Mahabalipuram.

== Filmography ==
Year	Title	Role	Notes
1971	The Last Valley	Claus	
1972	The Asphyx	Clive Cunningham	
1975	Deadly Strangers	2nd Motorcycle Youth	
1977	Blood Relations	Peter Steiger	
1979	The Quatermass Conclusion	Kickalong	
1982	Who Dares Wins	Terrorist #11	
1986	Dead Man's Folly	Michael Weyman	
1996–1998	Retrace	John Fisher	TV series, 9 episodes
2001	Two Days, Nine Lives	Clive	
