= Mistress of Hardwick =

British television historical drama

- Screenshot of the opening titles
- Genre: Drama; Historical
- Created by: Alison Plowden
- Written by: Alison Plowden
- Directed by: Rodney Bennett
- Starring: Hilary Mason; Anna Cropper; Preston Lockwood; Gary Lockwood
- Country of origin: United Kingdom
- Original language: English
- No. of series: 1
- No. of episodes: 10

Production
- Producer: Victor Poole
- Production location: Hardwick Hall
- Running time: 25 minutes

Original release
- Network: BBC 1
- Release: 9 April – 11 June 1972

Mistress of Hardwick is a British ten-part television drama broadcast on BBC 1 in 1972. The series deals with the life of the four-times married Elizabeth née Hardwick, later Mrs Elizabeth Barley (or Barlow), Elizabeth, Lady Cavendish, Elizabeth, Lady St Loe and lastly Elizabeth Talbot, Countess of Shrewsbury (c. 27 July 1521 – 13 February 1608). She was commonly known as Bess of Hardwick, and was the builder and chatelaine of one of the great Elizabethan prodigy houses, Hardwick Hall. The series was written by Alison Plowden, directed by Rodney Bennett, produced by Victor Poole and starred Hilary Mason as Bess of Hardwick. It is one of the BBC's "lost" series.

== Plot ==
In Radio Times, a 1977 abridged compilation of the series was described as "Scenes from an Elizabethan life. In 1603 Elizabeth lay dying in London. In Derbyshire, Bess of Hardwick and her granddaughter waited impatiently for news that the Queen had named her successor." As the series is lost, little more is known of the plot.

A tie-in book of the same name was written by Plowden, and published by the BBC in 1972. Its ten chapters have a slightly different order and naming to the television episodes. (Note: These are: 1 Honest Sweet Chatsworth, 2 Dangerous Alliance, 3 My Jewel Arbelle, 4 The Shrewsbury Scandal, 5 An Insatiable Dream, 6 Cousin to King James, 7 This Costly Countess, 8 This Unadvised Young Woman, 9 Royal Prisoner and 10 When Hardwick Towers Shall Bow Their Heads.)

== Cast and characters ==
- Narrator: Gary Watson
- Bess: Hilary Mason
- Arbella, Bess’s granddaughter: Anna Cropper
  - Arbella (as a child): Melinda Clancy
- Sir Henry Brounker: John Humphry
- William Cavendish (Bess's second husband): Barrie Cookson
- Shrewsbury (Bess's fourth husband): Preston Lockwood
- Lady Katherine Grey: Cecilia Darby
- Priest (The Rev Starkey): Peter Gale
- Bess’s mother: Wendy Johnson
- Robert Barlow (Bess's first husband): Robert Barry Jr
- Mary, Queen of Scots: Gilly McIver
- Elizabeth Cavendish: Clover Roope
- Charles Stuart: Graeme Thomas
- Lord Leicester’s man: Graham Suter
- Young man: Jeremy Wallis
- Arbella’s tutor: David Ashford (episode 4)
- Lutenist and music master: Michael Jessett
- Gilbert Talbot: Christopher Masters
- Eleanor Britton: Sheila Dunn
- Messenger from the council: Anthony Dutton
- Dorothy Stafford: Elizabeth Benson
- Lady: Sharon Duce
- unknown role: Jean Hampson
- Gentleman: Stephen Bradley
- Gentleman: Eilian Wyn
- Servant: Cyril Varley (episode 7)
- Henry Cavendish: Cyril Varley (episode 9)
- John Dodderidge: Eric Francis
- Gentleman: Jay Neill
- Stapleton: (Note: Given erroneously as Stapteton in the Radio Times archive. The 1972 tie-in book has it as Stapleton.) Michael Boone
- Chaplain: David Ashford (episode 10)
- Dancing master: Jack Edwards
- Dancers: The Nonsuch Dancers

== Production ==
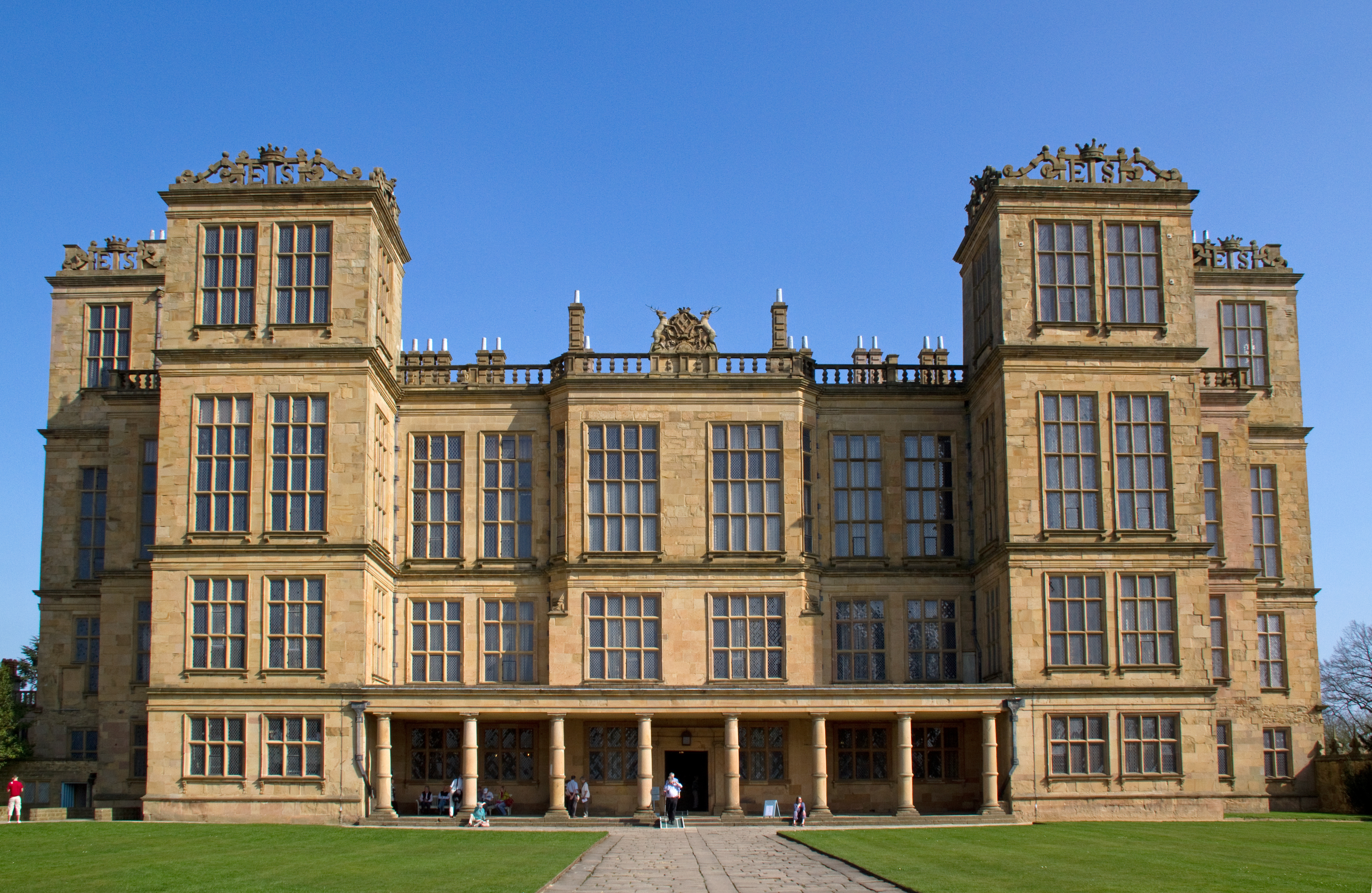
Hardwick Hall, where the series was set and filmed.

The series was based on thorough historical research, which was undertaken by Giles Oakley. Plowden wrote in the 1972 tie-in book "For the television programmes we reconstructed certain dialogue scenes from the letters of the Earl of Shrewsbury, Mary Queen of Scots and her mother-in-law the Countess of Lennox, of Bess herself, her grand-daughter Arbella Stuart and many others. We made use of diaries, account books, ambassadors' despatches, the reports of spies and the depositions of prisoners. None of the named characters was invented. There is contemporary evidence for every episode. Every significant line of dialogue, every quotation used, was either written or spoken at the time in question."

The series was filmed on location at Hardwick Hall. Plowden wrote "[...]in order to make the fullest possible use of the marvellous backdrop provided by that unique and beautiful house it was necessary, in writing the television scripts, to make use of a flashback technique, for Bess, who was not concerned with the problems of television producers and writer, did not begin to build Hardwick Hall until she was over seventy." It is assumed that the series was filmed in colour, as a screengrab of the title sequence is in colour. There is no information about whether the series was in black and white or colour in the scant BBC information available about the series.

The choreographer for the dance scenes was Peggy Dixon, and the dancers the Nonsuch Dancers.

== Reception ==
Plowden won the 1972 Writers' Guild of Great Britain Award for Best British Educational Script.

== Broadcast history in the UK ==
The ten 25-minute episodes (totalling 4 hours 10 minutes run-time) were first shown in April–June 1972, weekly on Sunday nights on BBC 1, with each episode repeated the following Thursday or a slightly later date, also on BBC 1. The following year the series was repeated, running from 13 April–15 June 1973 on BBC 2. From January to March 1976 the series was shown on BBC 1 Schools Programming. Finally, the ten episodes were condensed into a 95-minute-long programme, broadcast on 10 September 1977. This appears to be the last broadcast in the UK before the series was wiped.

== Lost series ==
Most if not all of the Mistress of Hardwick television series appears to be lost: "Unfortunately — and as is often the case with BBC programmes made at the time — almost all of this series appears to have been 'junked'."

== Episodes ==
No. in series	Title	Directed by	Original release date
1	"They Expect a New Queen"	Rodney Bennett	9 April 1972
Summary not available. Featuring Bess, Arbella, Sir Henry Brounker and William Cavendish.
2	"Honest Sweet Chatsworth"	Rodney Bennett	16 April 1972
Summary not available. Featuring Bess, Shrewsbury, Lady Katherine Grey, Priest (The Rev Starkey), Bess's mother and Robert Barlow.
3	"Dangerous Alliance"	Rodney Bennett	23 April 1972
Summary not available. Featuring Bess, Shrewsbury, Mary, Queen of Scots, Elizabeth Cavendish, Charles Stuart and Priest (The Rev Starkey).
4	"My Jewel Arbelle"	Rodney Bennett	30 April 1972
Summary not available. Featuring Bess, Arbella (as a child), Lord Leicester's man, Young man, Tutor and Lutenist.
5	"The Shrewsbury Scandal"	Rodney Bennett	7 May 1972
Summary not available. Featuring Bess, Mary, Queen of Scots, Shrewsbury, Gilbert Talbot and Eleanor Britton.
6	"An Insatiable Dream"	Rodney Bennett	14 May 1972
Summary not available. Featuring Bess, Arbella and the Nonsuch Dancers.
7	"Cousin to King James"	Rodney Bennett	21 May 1972
Summary not available. Featuring Bess, Arbella, Messenger, Dorothy Stafford, Gentleman, Gentleman, Lady, Henry Cavendish and an unknown part played by Jean Hampson.
8	"This Costly Countess"	Rodney Bennett	28 May 1972
Summary not available. Featuring Bess, Arbella, Priest (The Rev Starkey), Dodderidge and Lutenist.
9	"Royal Prisoner"	Rodney Bennett	4 June 1972
Summary not available. Featuring Bess, Arbella, Sir Henry Brounker, Gentleman, Henry Cavendish and Stapleton. (Note: Given erroneously as Stapteton in the Radio Times archive. The 1972 tie-in book has it as Stapleton.)
10	"When Hardwick Towers Shall Bow Their Heads"	Rodney Bennett	11 June 1972
Summary not available. Featuring Bess, William Cavendish and Chaplain.
