= Hilary Mason =

English actress (1917–2006)

- Born: 4 September 1917; Birmingham, United Kingdom
- Died: 5 September 2006 (aged 89); Milton Keynes, Buckinghamshire, England
- Occupation: Actress
- Years active: 1947–2006

Hilary Lavender Mason (4 September 1917 – 5 September 2006) was an English character actress who appeared in a wide variety of roles, mainly on UK television.

Mason was born in Birmingham and trained at the London School of Dramatic Art, before performing with repertory theatres throughout Britain. She is probably best known internationally for her performance as the blind psychic Heather in Nicolas Roeg's film Don't Look Now.

Mason had the starring role in Mistress of Hardwick, a 10-part BBC series broadcast in 1972, which followed the life of Bess of Hardwick. Most of the episodes are now lost.

She appeared in "Gunfight at the O.K. Laundrette", the pilot episode of ITV's critically acclaimed drama Minder. She also made regular appearances in Z-Cars and Dixon of Dock Green, and made an appearance in Ripping Yarns. In the 1985 BBC serial ‘’Miss Marple’’: The Moving Finger, she appeared as Emily Barton. In 1986 she appeared as Mrs Gummidge in the BBC series David Copperfield. Mason appeared in an episode of Juliet Bravo as Mrs Unwin in an episode called "Friends and Neighbours".

In later years Mason appeared as Gladys in the popular children's TV show Maid Marian and her Merry Men. One of her last roles was in the children's programme Aquila.

Mason died on 5 September 2006, at the age of 89.

== Filmography ==
Year	Title	Role	Notes
1960	Rockets in the Dunes	Mrs. Allen	
1963	The Yellow Teddy Bears	Miss Fletch	
1970	Morning Story	Mrs McIsaac	TV movie
1971	She'll Follow You Anywhere	Jackie's mum	
1972	Mistress of Hardwick	Bess of Hardwick	TV series (10-part)
1973	Don't Look Now	Heather	
1975	I Don't Want to Be Born	Mrs. Hyde	
1975	My Brother's Keeper	Mrs. Booth	TV series
1977	The Three Hostages	Mrs. Medina	TV movie
1977	Nicholas Nickleby	Mrs. Nickleby	TV series
1977–9	The Other One	Mrs. Flensing	TV series
1978	Absolution	Miss Froggatt	
1982	The Return of the Soldier	Ward	
1982	Ghost in the Water	Nan	TV movie
1983	Bullshot	Hotel Guest	
1984	The Jewel in the Crown	Mrs Roper	TV series
1984	Moonfleet	Jane Arnold	TV series
1985	Anna of the Five Towns	Sarah Vodrey	TV series
1987	Dolls	Hilary Hartwicke	
1989	Robot Jox	Professor Laplace	
1989	Agatha Christie's Poirot	Mrs Hill, Housekeeper. Series 1,episode 4.	
1989-1994	Maid Marian And Her Merry Men	Gladys	
1990	Meridian	Martha	
1991	Afraid of the Dark	Basement Woman	
1995	One Foot in the Grave	Marjorie Stewkley	TV series
1995	Haunted	Elderly Lady	
1998	Aquila	Elderly neighbour	
