= Morning Story =

1969 British film by BBC television

Morning Story is a British film made by BBC Television in 1969 and first broadcast in January 1970, directed by Gareth Davies and starring Lee Montague.

== Outline ==
A door-to-door salesman finds a young girl playing in the street, which leads him into unexpected adventures.

== Cast ==
- Lee Montague as Danny Robbins
- Hilary Mason as Mrs. McIsaac
- Stephanie Turner as Mrs. Woolford
- Bella Emberg as Mrs. Shaw
- Alex Marshall as Mrs. Allan
- Gilly Flower as Mrs. Johnson
- Heather Canning as Mrs. Valentine
- Ann Mitchell as Mrs. Harris
- Jo Richardson as Mrs. Lloyd
- Sue Walker as Mrs. Vernon
- Pamela Miles Mrs. Blackett
- Edna Landor as Mrs. Davis
- Jill Brooke as Mrs. Robertson
- Jumoke Debayo as Mrs. Harvey
- Kathleen St. John as Mrs. Helsby
- Kathleen Heath as Mrs. Cartwright
- Maggie Petersen as Mrs. Evans
- Sylvia Burrows as Mrs. Hanks
- Patti Dalton as Mrs. Carey
- Janet Whiteside as Mrs. Fennimore
