= Fiona Walker =

English actress (born 1944)

- Born: 24 May 1944 (age 82); London, England
- Occupation: Actress
- Years active: 1964–1994
- Spouse: Herbert Wise (m. 1988; died 2015)
- Children: 2, including Susannah Wise

Fiona Walker (born 24 May 1944) is an English actress, known for numerous theatre and television roles between the 1960s and 1990s.

An early leading role was as Sue Bridehead in a BBC television production of Jude the Obscure (1971). She may be best remembered for playing Agrippina in the BBC adaptation of I, Claudius (1976), directed by Herbert Wise. She was Miss Meteyard, an intelligent, wise-cracking copy-writer modelled on the author, in Dorothy L. Sayers's Murder Must Advertise, a BBC TV dramatisation of 1973, and an acidic Mrs Elton in BBC2's 1972 adaptation of Jane Austen's Emma. She played the ill-fated Stella Mawson in Anglia's first P. D. James adaptation, Death of an Expert Witness (1983), also directed by Wise. Other television appearances have included All Creatures Great and Small (1978), Pope John Paul II (1984), Bleak House (1985), The Woman in Black (1989), (directed by her husband), Agatha Christie's Poirot (1993), and two Doctor Who serials, 24 years apart, playing villainesses Kala in The Keys of Marinus in 1964, and Lady Peinforte in Silver Nemesis in 1988, as well as a definitive Ruth in Alan Ayckbourn's trilogy The Norman Conquests – Thames Television (1977).

Her film roles included Liddy in Far from the Madding Crowd (1967), the cult horror film The Asphyx (1972), and Century (1993), starring Charles Dance and Clive Owen.

Walker married Herbert Wise in 1988, after they had lived together for 17 years. Her children, Charlie Walker-Wise and Susannah Wise, are also actors.

== Partial filmography ==
- Far from the Madding Crowd (1967) – Liddy
- Jude the Obscure (1971) – Sue Bridehead
- The Asphyx (1972) – Anna Wheatley
- The Woman in Black (1989) – Mrs. Toovey
- Century (1993) – Mrs. Pritchard
