= Herbert Wise =

Austrian-born film and TV producer and director (1924–2015)

- Born: Herbert Weisz; 31 August 1924; Vienna, Austria
- Died: 5 August 2015 (aged 90); London, England
- Occupations: Actor, producer, director
- Spouse(s): Moira Redmond (1963-1972); Fiona Walker (1988)
- Family: Two children including Susannah Wise

Herbert Wise (31 August 1924 – 5 August 2015) was an Austrian-born film and television producer and director.

== Biography ==
Herbert Wise was born as Herbert Weisz in Vienna, Austria, and began his career as a director at Shrewsbury Repertory Company in 1950. He was at Hull Rep and then as Director of Productions at Dundee Rep (1952–55). He directed So what about Love in the West End at the Criterion Theatre in a 1970 production with Sheila Hancock in the lead.

Wise began his television career in 1956 and directed adaptations of I, Claudius (1976) and Alan Ayckbourn's play cycle The Norman Conquests (1977), the BBC Television Shakespeare production of Julius Caesar (1979), Tales of the Unexpected, The 10th Kingdom, The Woman in Black (1989), and episodes of Cadfael and Inspector Morse. He also directed several episodes of the Thames Television series Rumpole of the Bailey. He directed several made-for-TV films, including Skokie (1981) and Breaking the Code (1996), the latter adapted from the Hugh Whitemore play about Alan Turing.

Wise directed two theatrically released films: an entry in the Edgar Wallace Mysteries second feature series titled To Have and to Hold (1963), and the film version of the 1970–1971 television sit-com The Lovers titled The Lovers! (1973).

He was married twice, firstly to the actress Moira Redmond (1963–1972) and, after he and Redmond divorced, to actress Fiona Walker in 1988. Wise and Fiona Walker had two children; Susannah Wise and Charlie Walker-Wise.
