= Pauline Moran =

British actress

- Born: 26 August 1947 (age 78); Blackpool, Lancashire, England
- Occupations: Actress; astrologer
- Years active: 1973–present

Pauline Moran (born 26 August 1947) is an English actress, best known for her role as Miss Felicity Lemon in the British television series Agatha Christie's Poirot.

She trained at several schools, including the National Youth Theatre and the Royal Academy of Dramatic Art. Although primarily a stage actress, Moran has appeared in films such as The Good Soldier (1981), The Woman in Black (1989), Byron (2003) and A Little Chaos (2014), as well as the 1983 television series The Cleopatras. From 1965 to about 1970, she played bass guitar in the all-female band The She Trinity. She has also been a professional astrologer since 1987.

== Television ==
Year	Title	Role	Notes
1976	The ITV Play	Helen	Episode: "Our Young Mr Wignall"
1977	Romance	Gyspy Woman	Episode: "Three Weeks"
1977	Nicholas Nickleby	Miss Petowker	2 episodes
1977	Supernatural	Mary Lawrence	Episode: "Night of the Marionettes"
1979	Crown Court	Carole Gibbs	Episode: "Baby Love: Part 1"
1981	ITV Playhouse	Lesley Hutchinson	Episode: "Only a Game"
1981	The Good Soldier	Maisie Maidan	Television film
1981	The Trespasser	Helena	Television film
1982	Five-Minute Films	The Teacher	Episode: "Afternoon"
1983	The Cleopatras	Cleopatra Berenike	2 episodes
1984	The Prisoner of Zenda	Antoinette de Mauban	6 episodes
1988	The StoryTeller	Queen	Episode: "The Luck Child"
1989	Shadow of the Noose	Ruby Ray	Episode: "Sentence of Death"
1989	The Woman in Black	Woman in Black	Television film
1989	Poirot	Miss Lemon	TV series (32 episodes: 1989–2013)
1995	Bugs	Juliet Brody	Episode: "Down Among the Dead Men"
2003	Byron	Miss Curtin	Television film
2014	A Little Chaos	Ariane	
