= The Woman in Black (1989 film) =

- U.S. VHS cover
- Genre: Horror drama
- Based on: The Woman in Black by Susan Hill
- Screenplay by: Nigel Kneale
- Directed by: Herbert Wise
- Starring: Adrian Rawlins; Bernard Hepton; David Daker; Pauline Moran
- Music by: Rachel Portman
- Country of origin: United Kingdom
- Original language: English

Production
- Executive producer: Ted Childs
- Producer: Chris Burt
- Cinematography: Michael Davis
- Editor: Laurence Méry-Clark
- Running time: 103 minutes
- Production company: Central Independent Television

Original release
- Network: ITV
- Release: 24 December 1989

The Woman in Black is a 1989 British horror drama television film directed by Herbert Wise and starring Adrian Rawlins, Bernard Hepton, David Daker and Pauline Moran. The teleplay is adapted from the 1983 novel of the same name by Susan Hill. It focuses on a young solicitor who is sent to a coastal English village to settle the estate of a reclusive widow, and finds the town haunted.

The programme was produced by Central Independent Television for ITV, and premiered on Christmas Eve 1989. It was an unexpected success, though author Susan Hill reportedly disagreed with some of the slight changes screenwriter Nigel Kneale made in the adaptation.

Another film version, starring Daniel Radcliffe, was released in 2012.

== Plot ==
In 1925, London solicitor Arthur Kidd travels to the coastal market town of Crythin Gifford on England's east coast to attend the funeral and settle the estate of their client Alice Drablow, a reclusive widow. Upon his arrival, he meets Sam Toovey, a local landowner. Kidd finds the townspeople reluctant to talk about Drablow's home, Eel Marsh House.

When Kidd attends the funeral with local solicitor Pepperell, he notices an apparent mourner, a woman in black, but Pepperell becomes frightened when Kidd mentions her. Later, Kidd saves the life of a Romani child when logs break free from a lumber truck as it is passing through the village.

A local coachman takes Kidd to Eel Marsh House, which can be accessed only by a tidal causeway that appears at low tide. He shows Kidd how to start the generator that powers the house's electric lighting. Left alone at the house, Kidd explores the family graveyard and sees the mysterious woman from the funeral, terrifying him. In the study, he finds two death certificates and photographs of a young woman resembling her, and listens to some disturbing recordings made by Mrs. Drablow on wax cylinders. A short time later, the coachman arrives to take him back to town.

Toovey tells him not to return to the house, but Kidd insists he will not be afraid this time. Toovey loans Kidd his dog Spider. On his return, Kidd hears the sound of a bouncing ball emanating from upstairs. Spider starts barking and leads Kidd to a locked door. Kidd gets an axe to break the door, only to find that it has opened by itself. Inside is an immaculately-kept child's nursery. Kidd hears the sounds of a child greeting him and opens his hand to find that he is somehow holding a lead soldier. The generator runs down and he rushes outside to restart it.

Outside, Spider answers a whistle and runs away into the night. Kidd once again hears the echoing sounds of the drowning horse, woman, and child in the marsh. Frightened almost into madness, he takes refuge in the house and records his fears onto the wax cylinders.

From Mrs. Drablow's papers, Kidd learns that Mrs. Drablow's sister, Jennet Goss, had a child out of wedlock. The Drablows adopted the boy to save face, insisting he should never know Jennet was his mother. Jennet kidnapped her son and tried to escape via the causeway, but the pony and trap became stuck in the marshes and sank, killing all aboard.

Toovey arrives at Eel Marsh House, brought by Spider. He reveals that seeing the Woman in Black presages the death of a child. Kidd shows Toovey the recordings and the nursery. However, the room is now mysteriously a mess, with all the toys smashed. Shocked, Kidd collapses.

Kidd awakens in the town inn to the sound of the child's laughter and finds the lead soldier yet again in his hand. After asking what the child wants, the Woman in Black appears and shrieks in his face, terrifying him into unconsciousness.

Kidd falls ill for a few days and the Tooveys look after him. When he recovers, he returns to London and his family. Back in the office, his two assistants say that there was a customer waiting for him, a woman dressed as a widow in black. Kidd searches madly through the box of Mrs. Drablow's papers for the toy soldier. When he does not find it, he burns the papers and the box, and ends up burning half his office as well. His boss fires him.

Later, Kidd and his family are boating on a lake when he sees the Woman in Black standing on the surface of the water. A tree falls on their boat, crushing and drowning them all.

== Cast ==
- Adrian Rawlins as Arthur Kidd
- Bernard Hepton as Sam Toovey
- David Daker as Josiah Freston
- Pauline Moran as Woman in Black
- David Ryall as Sweetman
- Clare Holman as Stella Kidd
- John Cater as Arnold Pepperell
- John Franklyn-Robbins as Reverend Greet
- Fiona Walker as Mrs Margaret Toovey
- William Simons as John Keckwick
- Robin Weaver as Bessie
- Caroline John as Stella's mother
- Joseph Upton as Eddie Kidd
- Steven Mackintosh as Rolfe
- Andy Nyman as Jackie
- Robert Hamilton as Mr Girdler
- Trevor Cooper as Farmer
- Peter Guinness as Stallholder

== Production ==
The programme was filmed at Stanlake Park in Berkshire, using the causeway to Osea Island, near Goldhanger in Essex, and the local salt marshes, whilst scenes to represent Crythin Gifford were filmed at the National Trust village of Lacock, near Chippenham, Wiltshire. The external funeral scene was filmed in Sarratt, Hertfordshire.

== Release ==
=== Broadcast history ===
The film was first broadcast in the United Kingdom on ITV on Christmas Eve 1989, with the only repeat airing taking place on Channel 4 at Christmas 1994. Overall the TV adaptation stayed reasonably faithful to the original novel, although some of the changes angered the author Susan Hill (for example, the sex of the dog 'Spider' was changed from female to male). Arthur's name has also been changed from Kipps to Kidd.

=== Distribution dispute ===
A dispute over the distribution rights in the United Kingdom between Central Television and three of the film's original production team (who all owned a share) prevented the film from being either re-shown on television after 1994 or re-released on home media after 1991. Susan Hill herself did not own any part of the rights to the television film. The distribution rights became further complicated when the 2012 Hammer film version went into production.

=== Home media ===
The Woman in Black was originally released on VHS in the United Kingdom on 25 June 1990 by Futuristic Entertainment. It was re-released on VHS on 1 April 1991 by Video Collection International as an exclusive to WHSmith stores, but only for a fairly short time before becoming an out-of-print title.

There was also a North American release on Region 1 DVD by BFS Entertainment, on 8 August 2000, which is also now out-of-print. The US television rights have since been purchased twice and currently reside with a U.S. studio.

In the United Kingdom, Network Distributing were eventually able to secure the rights to re-release the film on both Blu-ray and DVD on 12 October 2020. The film for this release was restored and remastered in high-definition from the original film elements and features extras including a booklet, full screen and widescreen presentations and audio commentary by authors Mark Gatiss, Andy Nyman and Kim Newman.

== Critical reception ==
In his book Creature Features: The Science Fiction, Fantasy, and Horror Movie Guide (2000), John Stanley wrote that the film was a "chilly British ghost story in the best literary traditions of H. R. Wakefield and M. R. James... [it] has moments that will freeze your bone marrow." Lisa Kerrigan of the British Film Institute noted that the film "makes for a spine-tingling viewing experience." In 2011, Complex named the film the fourteenth-best television film of all time, noting that it "disturbs right down to its unbelievably downbeat ending."

== Awards and nominations ==
The Woman in Black was nominated for four BAFTA awards, including Best Design, Best Film Sound, Best Make Up and Best Original Television Music.

== See also ==
- List of ghost films

== Works cited ==
- Hand, Richard J. (2015). Listen in Terror: British Horror Radio from the Advent of Broadcasting to the Digital Age. Oxford: Oxford University Press. ISBN 978-1-526-10256-0.
- Stanley, John (2000). Creature Features: The Science Fiction, Fantasy, and Horror Movie Guide. New York: Berkley Boulevard Books. ISBN 978-0-425-17517-0.
