= Simon Oakes (executive) =

British film studio executive

Simon Oakes is a British film studio executive, who was the CEO and President of Hammer Film Productions until August 2023.

== Life ==
He was appointed chairman in May 2007 when the company was revived. The Hammer Film production company is a studio best known for its popular horror films during the 1950s-70s.

He worked on many Hammer projects, such as The Resident and The Woman in Black.

== Filmography ==
- 1989: The Adventures of William Tell (video) (executive producer)
- 1996: Savage Hearts (executive producer)
- 2008: Beyond the Rave (executive producer)
- 2010: The Way Back (executive producer)
- 2010: Let Me In (producer)
- 2011: The Resident (producer)
- 2011: Wake Wood (executive producer)
- 2012: The Woman in Black (producer)
- 2014: The Quiet Ones (producer)
- 2019: The Lodge (producer)

=== TV-series ===
- 1987 Crossbow (producer - 1 episode: "The Banquet")
- 1992 Chillers (TV series) (supervising producer - 1 episode - Under a Dark Angel's Eye)
