= Listed buildings in Chatsworth, Derbyshire =

Chatsworth is a civil parish in the Derbyshire Dales district of Derbyshire, England. The parish contains 34 listed buildings that are recorded in the National Heritage List for England. Of these, seven are listed at Grade I, the highest of the three grades, three are at Grade II*, the middle grade, and the others are at Grade II, the lowest grade. The centrepiece of the parish is Chatsworth House, which is listed, and all the other listed buildings are in the surrounding grounds, gardens, or park.

== Key ==
| Grade | Criteria |
|---|---|
| I | Buildings of exceptional interest, sometimes considered to be internationally important |
| II* | Particularly important buildings of more than special interest |
| II | Buildings of national importance and special interest |

== Buildings ==
| Name and location | Photograph | Date | Notes | Grade |
|---|---|---|---|---|
| Egyptian Statue (east); 53.22809°N 1.60985°W | — | c. 1570–1304 BC | The statue was collected by the 6th Duke of Devonshire, and brought here in the 19th century. It is in granite and consists of a seated female figure with a lion's head, set on a seat inscribed with hieroglyphic panels. | I |
| Egyptian Statue (west); 53.22807°N 1.61003°W | — | c. 1570–1304 BC | The statue was collected by the 6th Duke of Devonshire, and brought here in the 19th century. It is in granite and consists of a seated female figure with a lion's head surmounted by a head-dress, and set on a damaged seat. | I |
| Queen Mary's Bower; 53.22930°N 1.61563°W | | 16th century | A raised garden surrounded by a moat, it has a square plan, and sandstone walls. There are two moulded string courses, a parapet with a decorative balustrade at intervals, and a semicircular projection on two sides. On the south side is a massive staircase over a segmental-pointed arched bridge with stepped parapet walls, and a three-sided entrance at the top. The building is surrounded by a quatrefoil moat with a low coped retaining wall. | II* |
| The Hunting Tower; 53.23204°N 1.60438°W | | c. 1582 | The tower is in sandstone on a chamfered plinth, with moulded bands, and lead roofs. There are three storeys and a basement, and on each corner is a circular four-storey turret with a moulded cornice and a domed lead roof. Steps lead up to the south doorway that has a flat arch, a moulded surround, and a hood mould, and on the east front, steps lead down to the basement. Most of the windows are cross windows. | II* |
| Group of columns, Rose Garden; 53.22788°N 1.60981°W | | Late 17th century | The columns, which are in sandstone, were erected in their present site in 1812. They are in Tuscan style, four are in the centre of the garden and carry statues, four are at the south entrance and have busts, ten surround the garden and have ball finials, and there are two further columns on moulded pedestals. | II |
| Chatsworth House; 53.22783°N 1.61155°W | | 1687–89 | A large country house that has been extended and altered through the centuries. It is mainly in sandstone, with parapets hiding the roofs, and three storeys. There are four ranges around a courtyard, and a long northeast wing with a return range to the south. The south front has twelve bays, and the basement is rusticated. The outer three bays project, and are flanked by giant fluted Ionic pilasters. There is a full entablature, and on the top is a balustrade with urns. In the centre is a double return flight staircase, and the windows are sashes. The windows in the basement have segmental heads, and in the upper floors they have moulded architraves and stepped keystones. | I |
| The Seahorse Fountain; 53.22614°N 1.61169°W | | c. 1690 | The fountain by Caius Gabriel Cibber is in the middle of a circular pool. There are five jets, the outer four making a square. In the centre is a sculpture of a Triton, and by each of the outer jets is a sculpture of a seahorse. | II |
| Ice house (north); 53.23564°N 1.61054°W | — | 1693 (probable) | The ice house is in the park to the north of the house. It is in sandstone, and forms a mound covered in earth. The low flat entrance, now blocked, has a moulded lintel, and from it runs a curved retaining wall. | II |
| Temple of Flora; 53.22851°N 1.61090°W | | 1693–95 | Originally a bowling house, it was moved to its present site in about 1765. The building is in sandstone with a square plan. On the front are four fluted Roman Doric columns, a triglyph frieze, and a balustraded parapet with urns. Inside there is a statue of Flora. | I |
| Conduit House, Cascade and statues 53.22689°N 1.60740°W | | 1694 | The Cascade consists of a water staircase with 22 shallow steps, crossing a tunnel at its mid-point, and with a pond at the top. It is flanked by six statues in Carrara marble on sandstone plinths that were added in the early 19th century. At the top of the Cascade is the Conduit House, built in 1702. It is in sandstone with rustication, and has a square plan. In the centre of the front is a round arch with a keystone and moulded imposts, flanked by paired pilasters with carved dolphins. Over it is a moulded cornice, at the sides are blind recesses, at the ends are banded piers with scallop shells in the entablature, and above is a parapet with statues. The building is surmounted by a stepped dome and a tall circular domed lantern, and on the sides of the building are semicircular flights of steps. | I |
| Terrace with Statues; 53.22714°N 1.61240°W | — | 1690s | Running along the west front of the house is a sandstone retaining wall divided into bays, with moulded panels, and an iron balustrade. There are two flights of steps with an intermediate landing containing niches with statues. In the centre is a round-arched doorway with rusticated half-columns and a segmental pediment, and a parapet with urns. The formal garden to the west has a retaining wall with square piers with urns and statues of gladiators. At the corners are pedestals with relief carving on the sides, and surmounted by statues of sphinxes by Caius Gabriel Cibber. | II |
| The First Duke's Greenhouse; 53.22801°N 1.60983°W | | 1697 | The greenhouse was rebuilt in 1749–50, and altered in 1832 by Joseph Paxton. It is in sandstone with glazed roofs, and has a south front of 13 bays. The middle three bays form an open arcade with Tuscan columns, a triglyph frieze, a cornice, and a balustraded parapet with urns. The outer bays contain tall round-arched sash windows and an impost band, and above is a moulded cornice, and an ornamental moulded parapet with urns and busts. At the rear is a central round-arched entrance. | II* |
| Series of herms and altars 53.22557°N 1.60949°W | | c. 1730 | The herms and altars are laid out in a Y-shape to the east of the Ring Pond. The altars are small rectangular chests about 2 feet (0.61 m) high with relief decoration. There are five male herms on plain tapering piers with moulded bases and Greek inscriptions, five female herms on panelled tapering piers with acanthus and ribbon decoration, and two male fauns on piers. | II |
| Ice house (south); 53.22274°N 1.61200°W | — | Mid-18th century | The ice house is in the garden to the south of the house by the Canal Pond. It is sunk into the ground, and has a retaining dry stone wall of sandstone. The doorway, now blocked, has a stone lintel, and behind it is a circular domed structure. | II |
| Statue east of the Ring Pond; 53.22554°N 1.60889°W | — | 18th century | The statue is in lead, and depicts a mythological male figure carrying a goat on his shoulders. It stands on a rectangular stone pedestal, with apsidal ends, panels, and a moulded base and cornice. | II |
| Former Stables, Chatsworth House; 53.22884°N 1.60908°W | | 1758–67 | The stables were designed by James Paine, and have been converted for other purposes. The building is in sandstone with a sill band, impost band, a moulded cornice, and hipped Westmorland slate roofs. There are two storeys, four ranges around a courtyard, and a main front of nine bays. The wide middle bay contains a round-headed arch flanked by four attached columns with rusticated bands, an entablature, and a cornice over which is a coat of arms and a pedimented gable. On the roof is a clock and bell turret with a domed lantern. Flanking the middle bay are three-bay blind arcades containing sash windows, and at the ends are pavilions with round arches and open pediments. | I |
| Bridge on main approach to Chatsworth House; 53.22802°N 1.61625°W | | 1759–64 | The bridge was designed by James Paine, and is in sandstone. It consists of three segmental arches with step moulding, and a moulded hood mould. The bridge is carried on piers that have triangular cutwaters with curved tops, and it has an impost band. On the south side the cutwaters have pedestals on which are re-set statues by Caius Gabriel Cibber. At the top is a balustraded parapet, and at the ends are square piers with round-arched niches and sunken panels. The wing walls have similar parapets. | I |
| Grotto; 53.22235°N 1.60594°W | | 1798 | The grotto in the Arboretum is in sandstone boulders, built into a hillside, with a slightly curving front, and a roughly round-headed entrance, and it has a Welsh slate roof. Behind it is a circular rotunda surmounted by a timber summer house with a conical slate roof. | II |
| Row of eleven statues 53.22604°N 1.61080°W | — | Early 19th century | The eleven statues along the Broad Walk arer in marble and in antique style. They stand on sandstone plinths with moulded bases and caps. | II |
| Steps with urns and statues 53.22810°N 1.61036°W | — | Early 19th century | The flight of steps to the east of the orangery is in sandstone, and flanked by stepped parapet walls. At the foot of the steps are two statues of sitting dogs. The top of the flight is flanked by two urns in Carrara marble with relief carving, and in the centre is a larger urn on a carved pedestal. | II |
| Statues and vases on lawn, Chatsworth House; 53.22615°N 1.61132°W | — | 1820s | The statues and vases form a rectangle round the south lawn. At the head is a bronze sculpture of Endymion by Chantrey, after the original by Canova, on a stone plinth. The other eight statues and the two vases are in Carrara marble, and are in antique style on pedestals with moulded bases and caps. | II |
| The Willow Tree Fountain; 53.22614°N 1.60842°W | | c. 1830 | The fountain by Joseph Paxton replaced an earlier smaller version. It is in copper, and in the form of a willow tree, with jets of water spouting from its branches. The tree stands on a roughly circular base of irregularly laid dry stone sandstone boulders. | II |
| Foundation Walls, Great Conservatory; 53.22405°N 1.60850°W | | 1835–40 | The foundation walls of the Great Conservatory designed by Joseph Paxton are in sandstone, and the rest of the building was demolished in 1920. They are low walls, slightly inward leaning, with sides of 19 and eight bays. The bays are divided by piers with flat copings, and each contains a blind segmental arch. | II |
| Retaining walls and steps, Great Conservatory; 53.22454°N 1.60877°W | | 1835–40 | The retaining walls surrounding the rectangular sunken area, formerly occupied by the Great Conservatory, are in sandstone with flat copings. At the corners are diagonal flights of steps with two landings and square piers with flat caps, some with urns. At the north end is a bridge that has a rusticated round arch with an impost band, a parapet with ball finials, and curving walls with urn finials. | II |
| The Conservative Wall; 53.22849°N 1.61002°W | | 1838 | A forcing wall that was converted into greenhouses in 1848 by Joseph Paxton. The greenhouses extend for 331 feet (101 m), they are 7 feet (2.1 m) wide, and are stepped up a hill in eleven units. The wall is in sandstone, and the greenhouses have a plinth, and a substructure in timber and glass, with a decorative valance and a parapet. The central unit contains the entrance, it is taller, and has a round-arched doorway with a fanlight. | II |
| Summer house 53.22814°N 1.60634°W | | 1839 | The summer house, also known as Luttrell's Seat, in the grounds of the house is in sandstone, with overhanging eaves on moulded brackets, a parapet with stepped triangular motifs, and a rectangular plan. On the front is a two-bay open arcade of horseshoe arches, with polished granite columns and carved capitals from Palermo. There is decorative work on the pilasters, the arches, and the underside of the eaves. Inside is a bench on moulded brackets. | II |
| Swiss Cottage; 53.22732°N 1.59180°W | | 1839 | The house is in sandstone, with overhanging eaves on brackets with elaborate valancing, and a slate roof. There are two storeys and a T-shaped plan. The west front has a gabled bay on the left with a bowed front, containing round-arched windows, the upper window with a decorative hood mould. To the right is a timber open porch with a circular column at the corner and a palisaded parapet, containing a round-arched doorway. To the right are round -arched windows, the upper one in a gabled half-dormer. | II |
| Aqueduct; 53.22687°N 1.60322°W | | c. 1840 | The aqueduct in the grounds of Chatsworth House was designed by Joseph Paxton. It is in rusticated sandstone with dry stone construction. The aqueduct consists of four tall round-headed arches, and ends in a cascade. | II |
| Doric column and bust 53.22334°N 1.60981°W | | c. 1840 | The bust depicts, the 6th Duke of Devonshire. It is set on an ancient fluted marble column from Minerva Sunnias set on a square sandstone base. | II |
| Urn to Blanche; 53.22269°N 1.61167°W | — | c. 1840 | The urn, at the end of the Broad Walk, is in sandstone. It has a square pedestal with a moulded base, and is inscribed with "BLANCHE". | II |
| The Emperor Fountain; 53.22503°N 1.61170°W | | 1843–44 | The fountain, towards the north of the Canal Pond, was designed by Joseph Paxton. It consists of a metal jet surrounded by boulders, and to the north are two sandstone sculptures of reclining figures. | II |
| White Lodge; 53.23804°N 1.61505°W | | 1855 | The lodge is in rendered sandstone, and has a lead roof with decorative valancing. There is a single storey and a T-shaped plan, the end having a polygonal head. The rear wing is weatherboarded, the windows are sashes, and iron columns support the overhanging roof. To one side of the lodge is a ramped wall, and the other side has a gateway that has four square piers with moulded caps and ball finials. | II |
| Former game larder 53.22988°N 1.61086°W | | 1909 | The former game larder is in sandstone, on a moulded plinth, with an architrave, cornice, and blocking course. It has an octagonal plan, with one side open as the entrance, over which is a moulded segmental pediment. In the other sides are cross windows. | II |
| Giallo Sarcophagus; 53.22774°N 1.60852°W | | Undated | The antique sarcophagus was collected by the 6th Duke of Devonshire, and brought here in the 19th century. It is in marble, and carved in deep relief on the sides with swags. The top is gabled, and there are antefixae at the corners. | II |
