= Emperor Fountain =

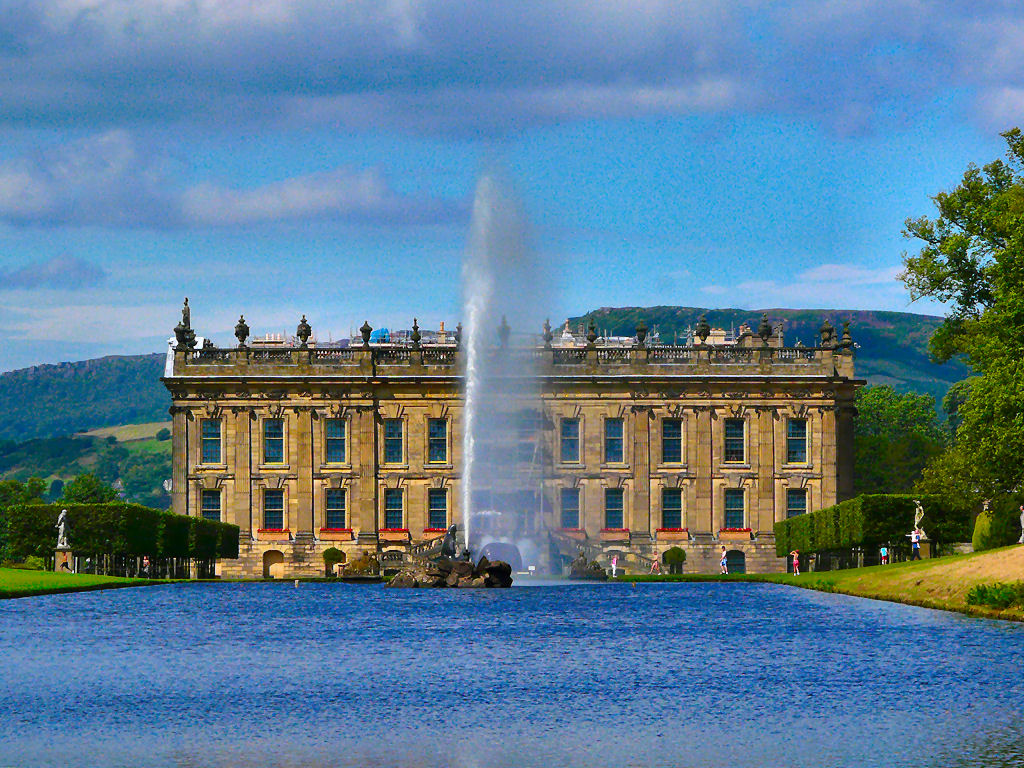
- Emperor Fountain at Chatsworth House

- Location in Derbyshire
- 53.226222°N 1.608713°W
- Location: Chatsworth House, Derbyshire, England
- OS grid reference: SK 261 700

History
- Built: 1844
- Built for: William Cavendish, 6th Duke of Devonshire

Site notes
- Architect: Joseph Paxton

Listed Building – Grade II
- Official name: The Emperor Fountain
- Designated: 19 June 1987
- Reference no.: 1334719

The Emperor Fountain is a 19th-century fountain in the grounds of Chatsworth House, Derbyshire, England. The Canal Pond in which the fountain stands is 283 metres (928 ft) long and 30 metres (98 ft) wide. The fountain and pairs of surrounding sculptures have been designated by English Heritage as a Grade II listed building.

== History ==
In 1843 Tsar Nicholas I of Russia informed William Cavendish, 6th Duke of Devonshire, that he was likely to visit Chatsworth the following year. In anticipation of this visit, the Duke decided to construct the world's highest fountain, and set Joseph Paxton to work to build it. An eight-acre (32,000 m^{2}) lake, the Emperor Lake, was dug on the moors 350 feet (110 m) above the house to supply the natural water pressure.

The work was finished in just six months, early in 1844, and the resulting water jet is on record as reaching a height of 296 feet (90 m). However, the Tsar died in 1855 and never saw the fountain. The fountain was seen by Prince Wilhelm of Prussia, who visited the park on Thursday 22 August 1844.

The fountain is at the north end of the Canal Pond, which was dug in 1703. The metal jet is surrounded by irregularly placed boulders. To the north are two sandstone sculptures of reclining figures.

Because of the limited supply of water, the fountain usually runs on partial power and only reaches half its full height, but occasionally it is switched to maximum flow.

The water power found a practical use generating Chatsworth's electricity from 1893. Gilkes of Kendal installed three vortex turbines and a generator in an underground chamber, approximately 120 m (400 feet) down the hill from the Emperor Lake. From 1936 the house was then connected to the mains supply. In 1988 a new turbine was installed, which produces about a third of the electricity the house needs.

== See also ==
- Listed buildings in Chatsworth, Derbyshire
