= Column of the Temple of Poseidon at Chatsworth =

Column of the Temple of Poseidon at Chatsworth House
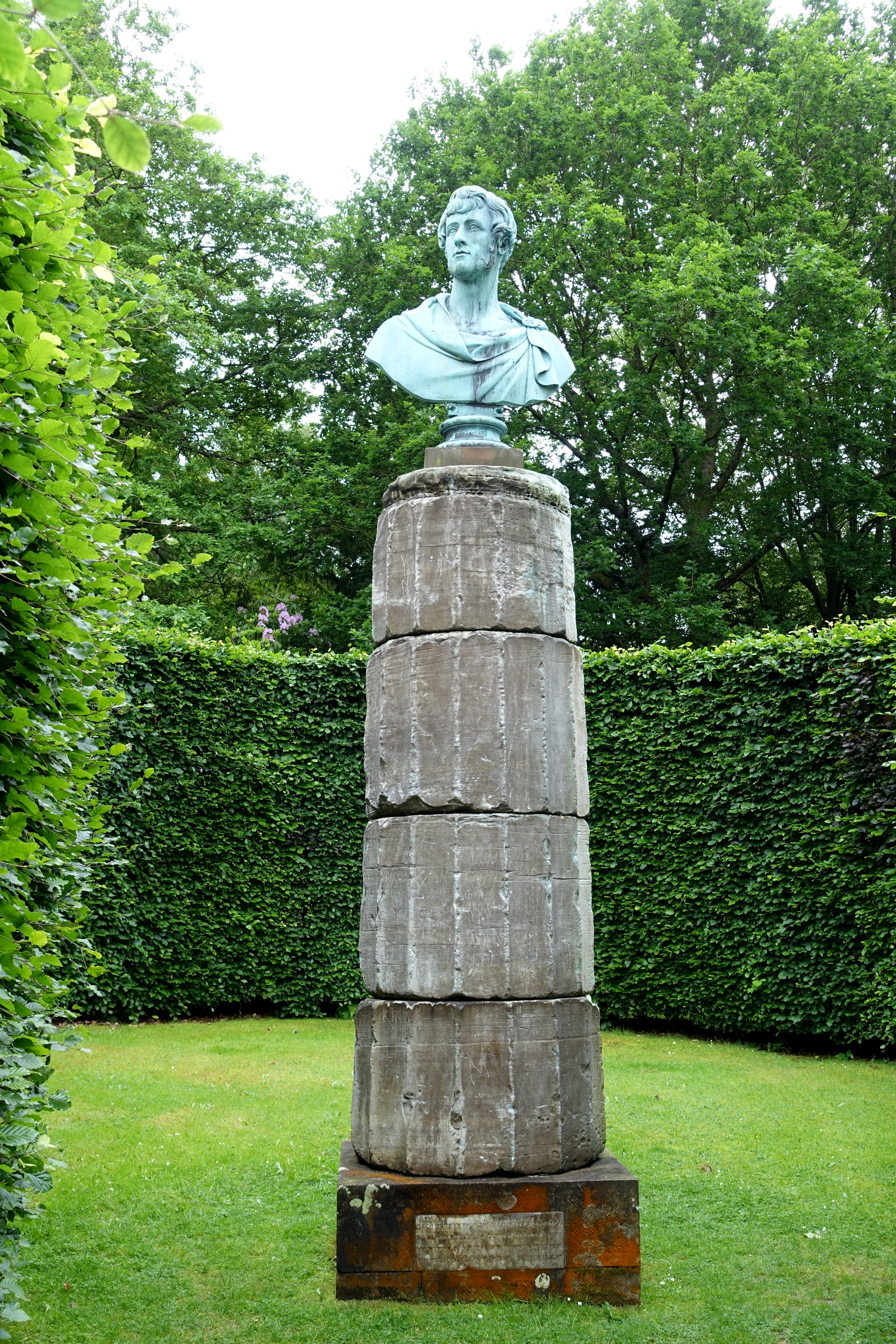
- Front of the column enclosed by the Serpentine Hedge
- Interactive map of Column of the Temple of Poseidon at Chatsworth House
- Location: Chatsworth House, Derbyshire, England
- Coordinates: 53.223341°N 1.609842°W
- OS grid reference: SK 26145 69659
- Built: c. 1840
- Built for: William Cavendish, 6th Duke of Devonshire
- Architectural styles: Doric order, Neoclassical sculpture

Listed Building – Grade II
- Official name: Doric Column and the Bust of Sixth Duke
- Designated: 19 June 1987
- Reference no.: 1051668

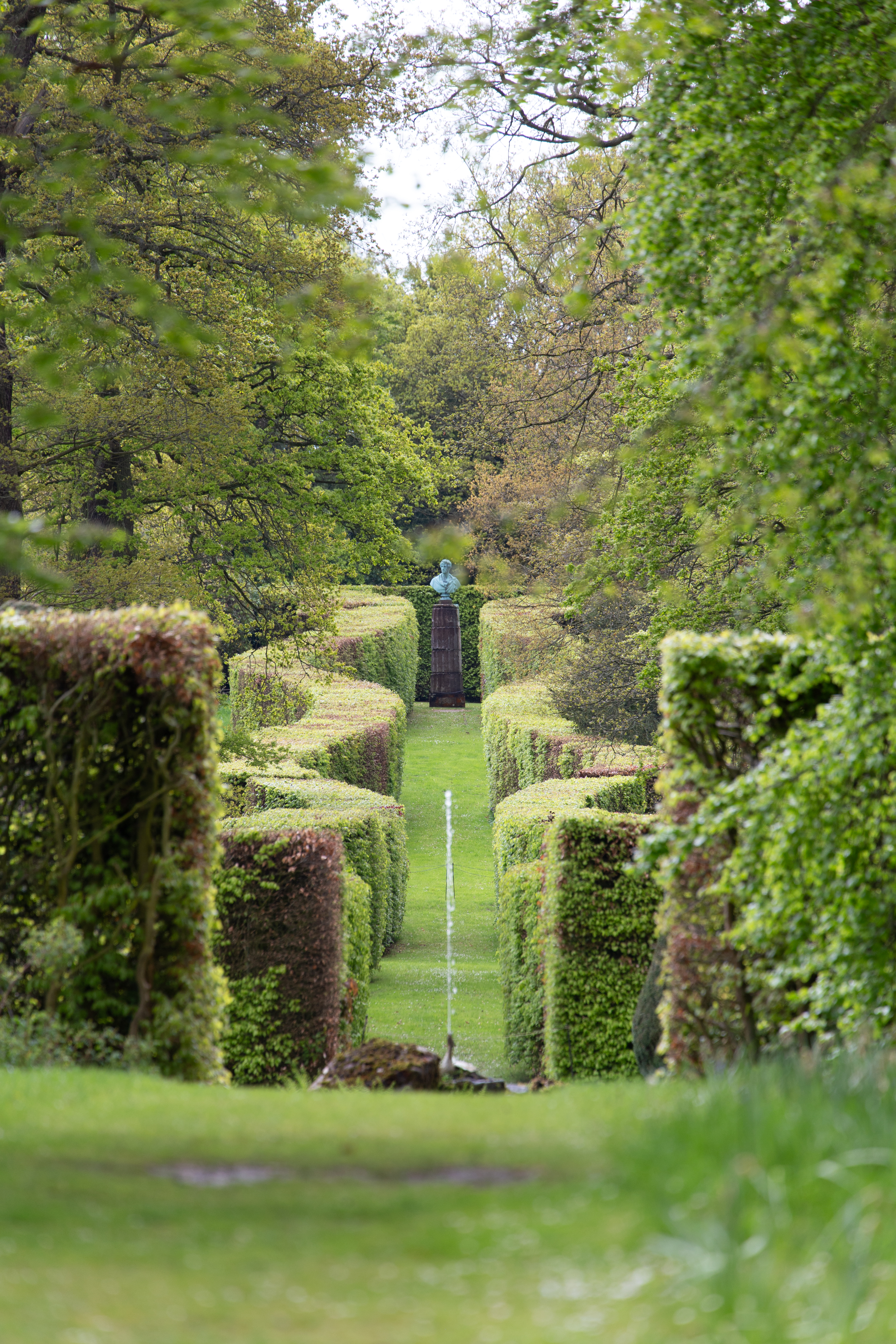
The bust framed by the Serpentine Hedge

The column of the Temple of Poseidon is one of the surviving features in the Chatsworth House garden from the period of William Cavendish, 6th Duke of Devonshire. Surmounted by an over life-sized bronze bust of the sixth Duke, the Ancient Greek column of four Doric marble drums on a square sandstone base was erected c. 1840. It is located at the south termination of the Serpentine Hedge, by the midpoint of a footpath linking between the Maze and the south end of the Broadwalk. The structure has been Grade II listed since 1987.

== Origin and history ==
The fluted drums were taken from the Temple of Poseidon, Sounion in Attica, Greece, dated c. 480 BC. However, as can be seen from the object's pedestal poem inscription whereby its provenance was mistakenly referred to Minerva (the Greek Athena), the name of the Temple of Poseidon was misunderstood in 19th century until 1897, when Valerios Stais’ excavation of this site rediscovered the temple's name and its worshiped deity, Poseidon, god of the sea. Further research suggests that the four drums are presumably from a single collapsed Poseidon Temple column of which the bottom, 3rd, 4th and the 6th drum were stacked in sequence and formed this object. The probable seventh one is held in the British Museum.

Some point before the publication of his Handbook (1845), possibly in 1825 when his half brother returned from the Mediterranean voyage, the sixth Duke of Devonshire was gifted these column drums from his half brother Augustus Clifford, who at the time was the captain of HMS Euryalus and collected several antiquities in Greece between 1821 and 1825 during his military deployment in the Mediterranean.

The bronze bust is a work of Thomas Campbell, commissioned by the sixth Duke during 1822–1823 in his trip to Rome.

The lines on the base were composed by the Duke's nephew, George Howard, 7th Earl of Carlisle (then Lord Morpeth), before 1831.

== Pedestal inscriptions ==
The column's 19th-century sandstone pedestal has metal plaques on three faces inscribed:

=== North ===
These fragments stood on Sunium's airy steep,
They reared aloft Minerva's guardian's shrine,
Beneath them rolled the blue Aegean deep,
And the Greek pilot hailed them as divine.

=== West ===
Such was e’en then their look of calm repose,
As wafted round them came the sound of fight,
When the glad shout of conquering Athens rose,
O’er the long track of Persia's broken flight.

=== South ===
Tho clasped by prostrate worshippers no more,
They yet shall breathe a thrilling lesson here,
Tho distant from their own immortal shore,
The spot they grace is still to freedom dear.

== Gallery ==
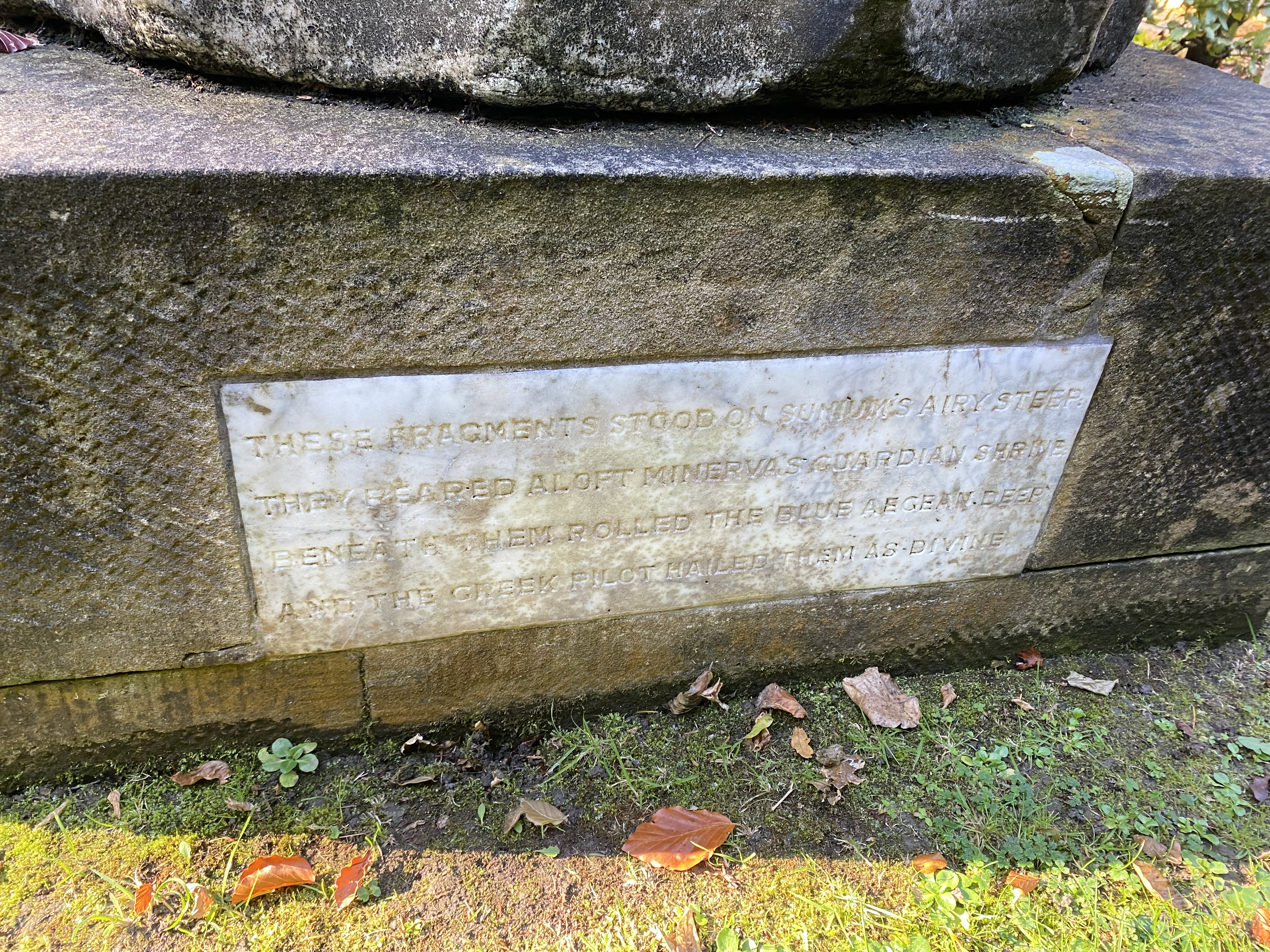
North inscription

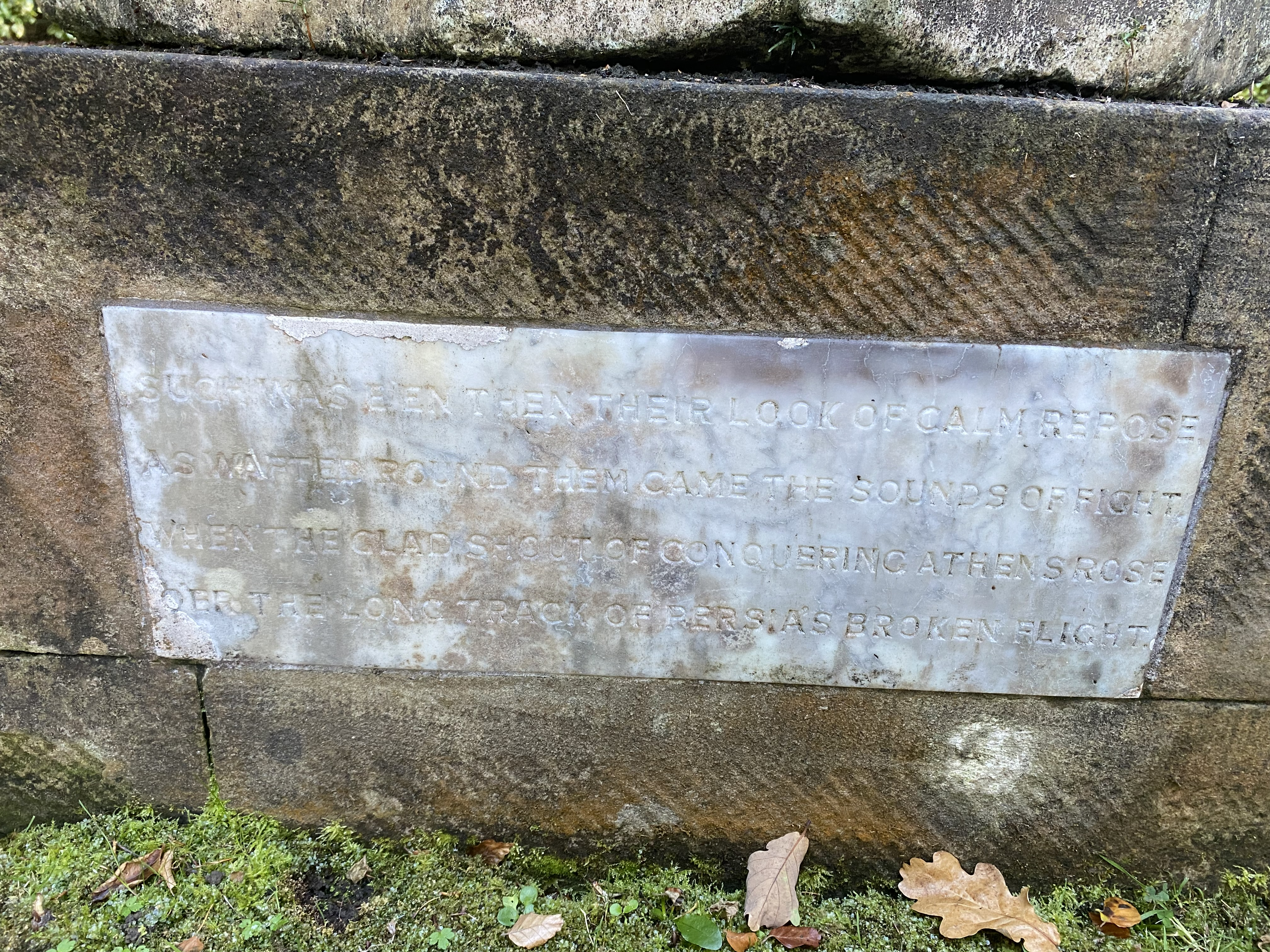
West inscription

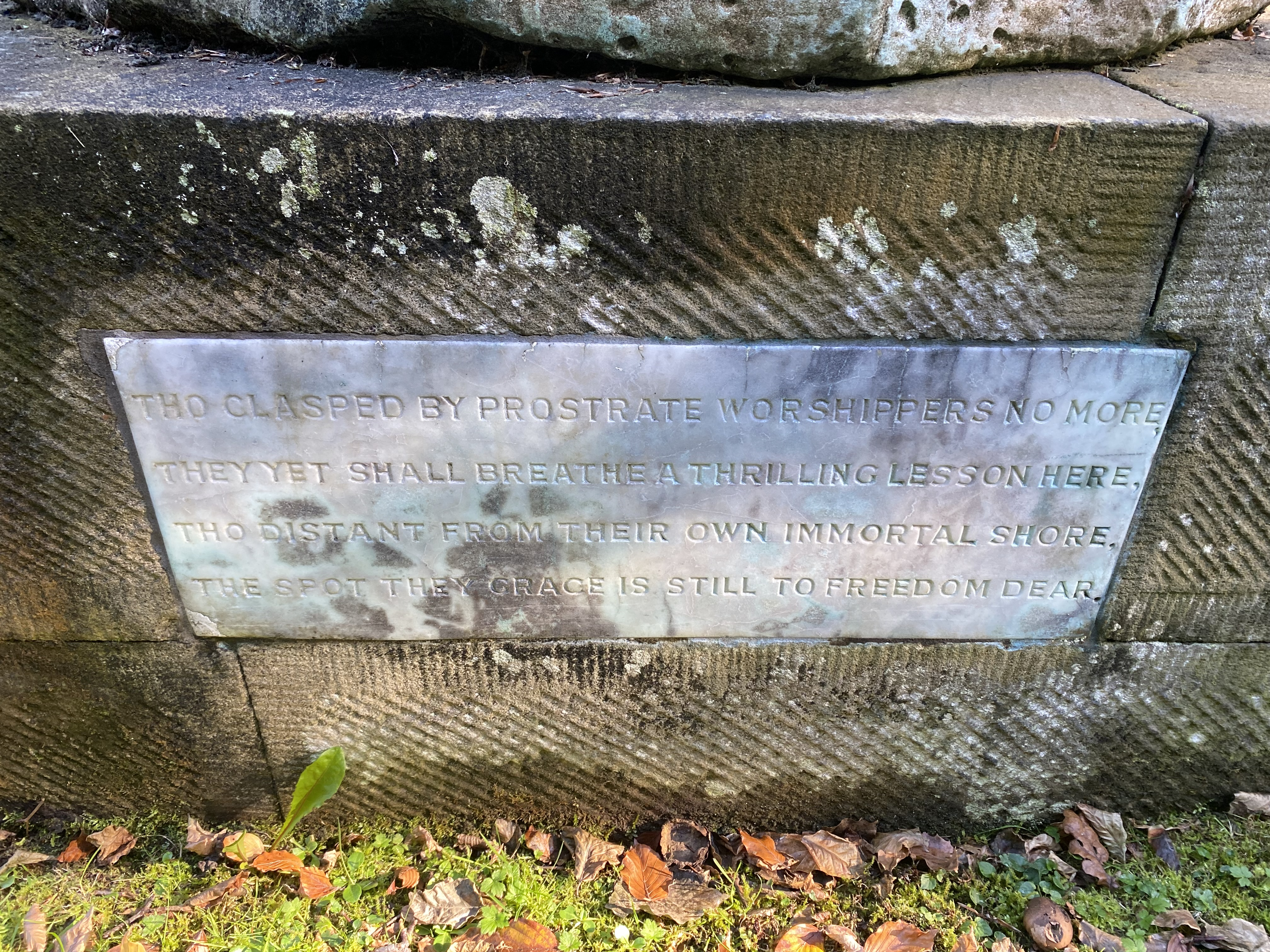
South inscription

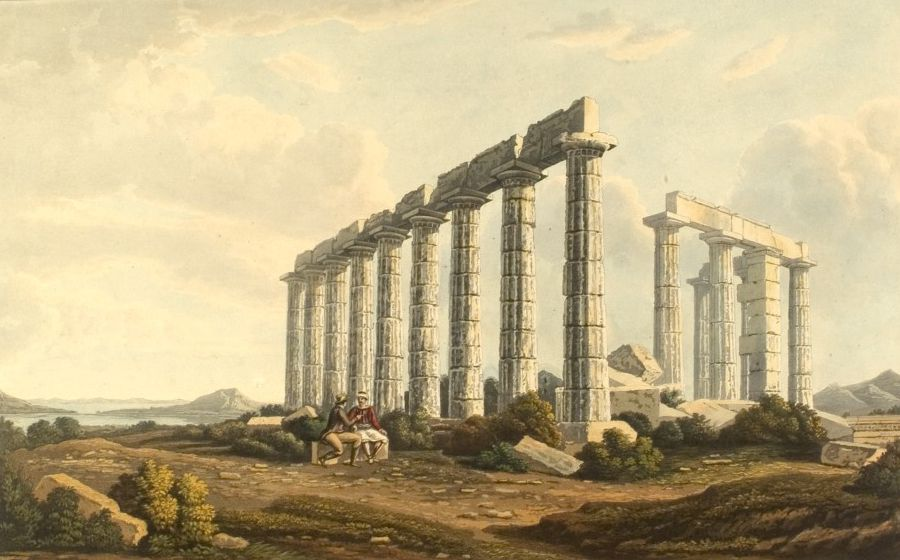
The temple at Sounion from Edward Dodwell's Views in Greece (1821)

== See also ==
- Listed buildings in Chatsworth, Derbyshire
