= Great Victorian Way =

Unbuilt London infrastructure project

Coordinates: 51.510°N 0.134°W

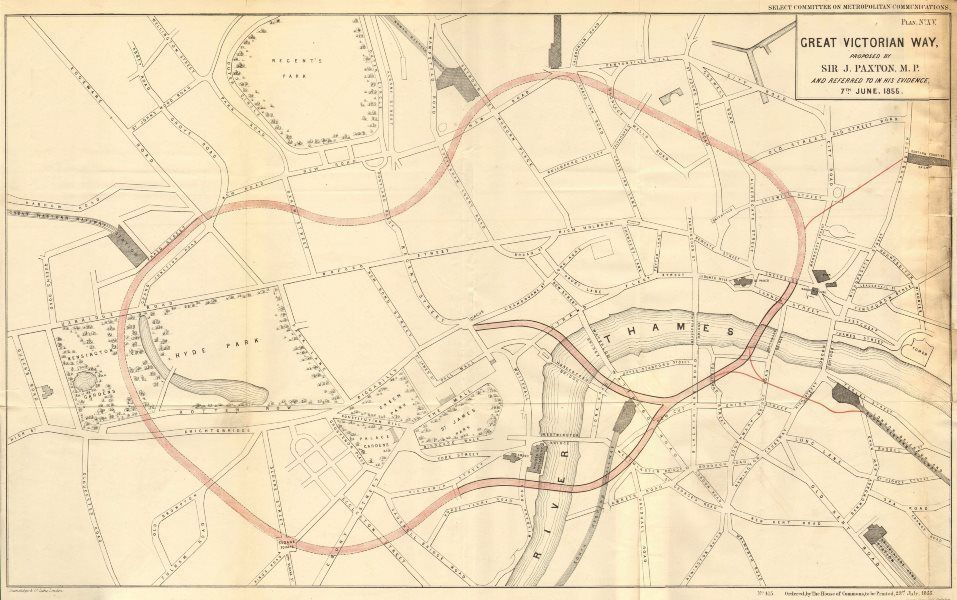
Paxton's planned map of the Great Victorian Way

The Great Victorian Way was an unbuilt infrastructure project, plans for which were presented to the Parliamentary Select Committee on Metropolitan Communications by its designer Joseph Paxton in June 1855. It would have consisted of a ten-mile covered loop around much of central and west London, integrating a glass-roofed street, railways, shops and houses. Three river crossings – two on the main loop and one on a branch – would have continued the arcade, creating inhabited bridges. The structure was closely modelled on Paxton's own Crystal Palace.

The proposal was sympathetically received by the committee, and also endorsed by Prince Albert prior to the passing of an act of Parliament authorising its construction, but ultimately abandoned on grounds of cost when the Great Stink of 1858 caused all London's infrastructure attention and funds to be devoted to the creation of a functioning sewer network system designed by Sir Joseph Bazalgette.

The later, less ambitious Circle line roughly followed the route of The Great Victorian Way and produced some of its transport benefits.

== Plan presented to the select committee ==
Paxton pointed out that it took longer to travel by road between the mainline railway termini at Paddington and London Bridge than it did to travel by train between London Bridge and Brighton. His solution to this, and the problems of travelling between the City and the West End, was to build a "boulevard or railway girdle", linking the termini, most of which had been built outside the central area of London.

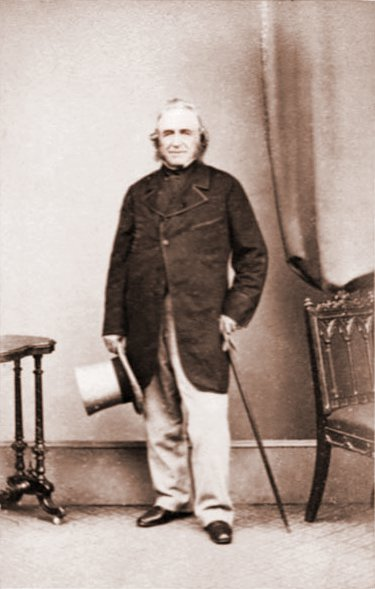
Joseph Paxton by Maull & Co, c1860s

=== Route ===
Paxton's suggested route went through the City from Cheapside to Mansion House and across Cannon Street, crossing the river between Southwark Bridge and Blackfriars Bridge. It then ran through to The Cut and Lambeth before crossing the Thames again south of the Houses of Parliament. It passed near Victoria Street and through Sloane Square, Brompton and Kensington Gardens to the Great Western terminus at Paddington. Then, cutting through Marylebone, it took a path eastwards midway between Oxford Street and Regent's Park, to the termini of the London and North Western Railway at Euston and the Great Northern at King's Cross, completing the circle by returning to Cheapside via south Islington and Aldersgate.

An inward branch from The Cut went in front of the South Western Railway's Waterloo station and then across the Thames midway between the Hungerford railway bridge and Waterloo bridge, reaching a terminus at Piccadilly Circus. The "girdle" would have been about ten miles long, and the branch one mile. Paxton told the select committee there was no need to take the route further east as "towards Whitechapel there are people who do not go about so much."

=== Structure ===
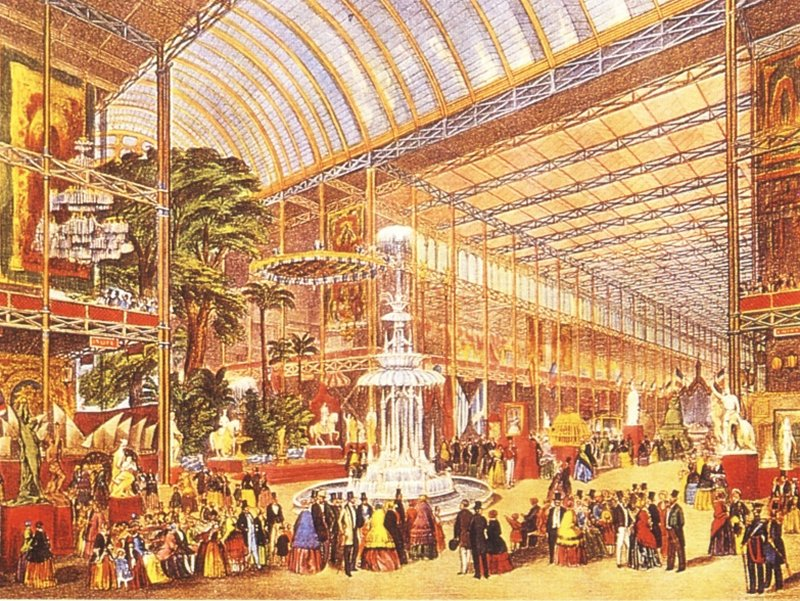
Paxton's Crystal Palace, on which the Great Victorian Way was modelled

The structure was modelled on Paxton's own Crystal Palace. A glass-roofed arcade 72 feet wide and 108 feet high would cover a central roadway. Between the City and Regent's Street the roadway would have been lined with shops, while in Brompton and other areas of west London there would have been private residences. Behind the shops and residences, there would be two levels of narrow-gauge atmospheric railway tracks on each side, one for fast trains and one for slow trains.

Atmospheric railways had failed in the past, but Robert Stephenson, usually sceptical about the system, had assured Paxton that they would be practical in these more controlled conditions. A double wall would insulate the residences from the noise of the trains. Existing streets would cross the roadway on the level, with the railways running uninterrupted above." People, I find", Paxton said "will never go much above the ground, and they will never go under ground". The structure would be dry, well-ventilated and easy to maintain—being under cover the road would never become muddy. The same basic cross-section would have been used for the river crossings as for the parts across land creating inhabited bridges – Victorian equivalents of Old London Bridge.

The walls of the arcade would be faced in ceramic tiles. Its glass roof would keep out the polluted atmosphere of London, and promote a healthy circulation of air. In the section across Kensington Gardens there would be no shops or houses, and the arcade would provide a place to exercise in bad weather.

=== Operation and finance ===
The road would have been open to all kinds of vehicles until nine in the morning, to allow for delivery of coal and merchandise, but only to omnibuses and passenger carriages after that time, At night the railway would carry goods between the various mainline railway termini. They would, however, have no direct link to any existing track.

Paxton estimated the total cost at £34,000,000. Income would have been generated from the rental from the shops and houses, and from the railway, with no tolls being charged for pedestrians or vehicle passengers. He estimated that the railway would carry about 105,000 passengers each day.

== Bibliography ==
- Report from the Select Committee on Metropolitan Communications, together with the proceedings of the Committee, Minutes of Evidence and Appendix. London. 1855. pp. 77–96.
