= Chatsworth, Derbyshire =

Civil parish in Derbyshire, England

Coordinates: 53.22°N 1.61°W

Chatsworth
- Chatsworth parish highlighted within Derbyshire
- Civil parish: Chatsworth
- District: Derbyshire Dales
- Shire county: Derbyshire
- Region: East Midlands
- Country: England
- Sovereign state: United Kingdom
- Post town: BAKEWELL
- Postcode district: DE45
- Dialling code: 01246
- Police: Derbyshire
- Fire: Derbyshire
- Ambulance: East Midlands
- UK Parliament: Derbyshire Dales

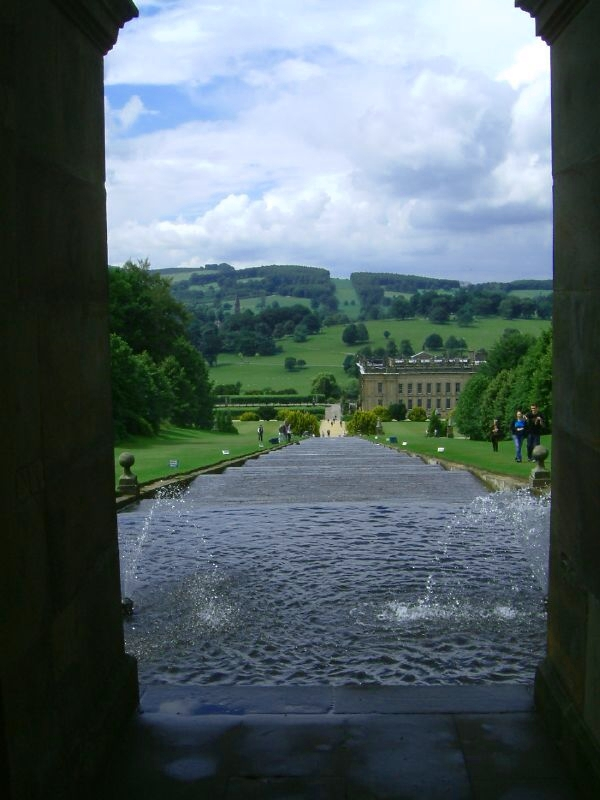
Chatsworth House

Chatsworth is a civil parish in Derbyshire, England, within the area of the Derbyshire Dales and the Peak District National Park.

The population is largely in and around Chatsworth House and is considered to be too low to justify a parish council. Instead, there is a parish meeting, at which all electors may attend.

Most of Chatsworth belongs to the Duke of Devonshire's Chatsworth estate, the villages of which include Beeley, Pilsley and Edensor.

== History ==
John Marius Wilson's Imperial Gazetteer of England and Wales (1870-1872) says -

CHATSWORTH, an extra-parochial tract, containing a grand seat of the Duke of Devonshire, in Bakewell district, Derby; on the river Derwent, 3½ miles NE of Bakewell. Pop[ulation]., 53. Houses, 8. The domain was held for the Crown at the Conquest by William Peveril; passed to the Leches and the Agards.

In the reign of Edward III, William de Furneaux granted lands in Chatsworth, Beeley and Chelmorton to Godfrey Foljambe. William de Furneaux had himself purchased the manor from the de Beeley family in the 13th Century, the de Furneaux's were descended from the De Avenal's. Cherecourt's, and the Saxon Lord Ingram who held vast estates in the region. A branch of this the line from Beighton and Eyam - The Unwin's still reside in the region today.

Chatsworth was purchased, in the 16th century, by Sir William Cavendish. A quadrangular mansion, defended by towers, was founded on it by Sir William, and completed by his widow, the famous Countess of Shrewsbury; was the prison, for several years, of Mary Queen of Scots; was the prison also of Marshal Tallard, taken at Blenheim; was held alternately by the parliamentarians and the royalists in the civil wars; and was, for some time, the abode of Hobbes of Malmsbury, as family tutor, and the place where he wrote his ' ' Wonders of the Peak;" but has entirely disappeared. The present mansion was chiefly built in 1687-1706, by the first Duke of Devonshire, after designs by Talman and Wren...

John Bartholomew's Gazetteer of the British Isles says -

Chatsworth, par[ish]., N[orth]. Derbyshire, on river Derwent, 2½ miles NE. of Bakewell and 21½ miles NW. of Derby, 1292 ac. (45 water), pop. 60. Chatsworth Hall, seat of the Duke of Devonshire, is one of the noblest residences in England. The park is over 11 miles in circuit, and the gardens cover an area of 12 ac. Mary Queen of Scots was imprisoned in the old mansion (1570-84). The present edifice was begun in 1688, and was finished in 1840, the additions being made at long intervals.

== See also ==
- Listed buildings in Chatsworth, Derbyshire
