= Temple of Poseidon, Sounion =

Ancient Greek temple in East Attica, Greece

Temple of Poseidon
- Ναός του Ποσειδώνα
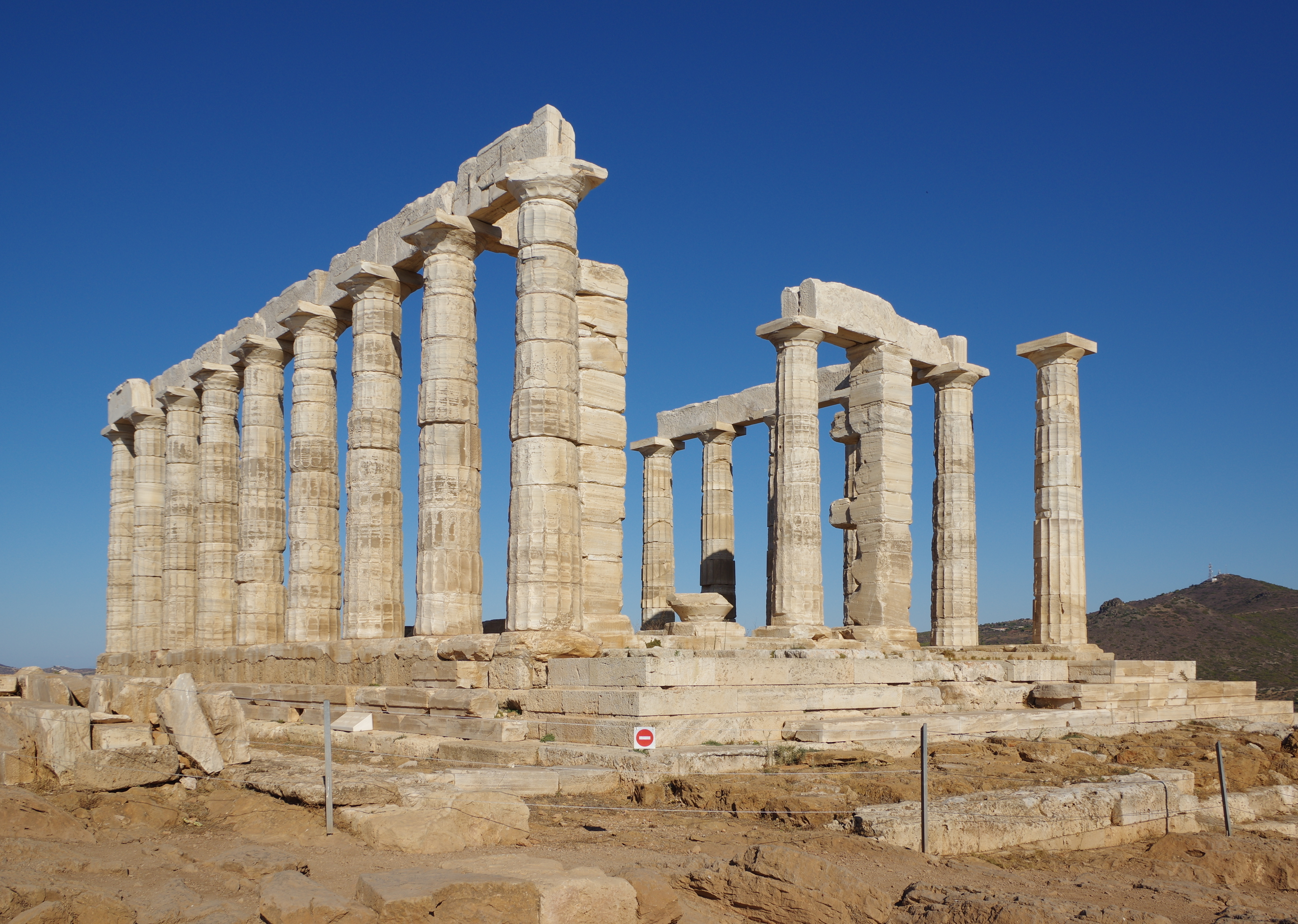
- View of the temple

- Location within Greece

General information
- Type: Greek temple
- Architectural style: Ancient Greek architecture
- Location: Cape Sounion, Greece
- Coordinates: 37.6592°N 24.0148°E
- Completed: c. 444–440 BC

The Temple of Poseidon is an ancient Greek temple on Cape Sounion, Greece, dedicated to the god Poseidon. There is evidence of the establishment of sanctuaries on the cape from as early as the 11th century BC. Sounion's most prominent temples, the Temple of Athena and the Temple of Poseidon, are however not believed to have been built until about 700 BC, and their kouroi (freestanding Greek statues of young men) date from about one hundred years later. The material and size of the offerings at the Temple of Poseidon indicate that it was likely frequented by members of the elite and the aristocratic class.

The Greeks considered Poseidon to be the "master of the sea". Given the importance to Athens of trade by sea and the significance of its navy in its creation and survival during the 5th century, Poseidon was of a particular relevance and value to the Athenians.

== Geography ==
Approximately 13 kilometres (8.1 mi) south of Thorikos in the southern most region of Attica, the deme of Sounion is most well known for its sanctuaries of Poseidon and Athena. Its placement at the foot of Attica allowed it to function as a borderhop as it could easily be seen by ships nearing Attica.

== History ==
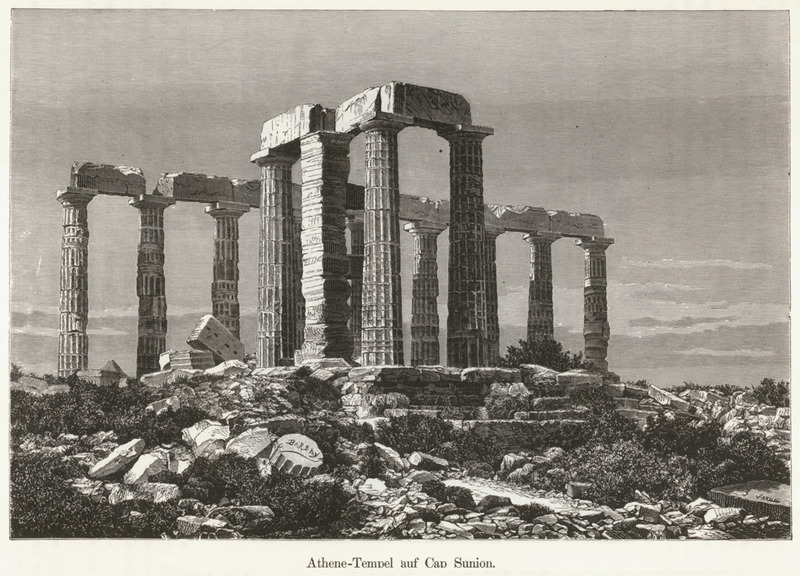
1887 depiction

The original, Archaic-period temple of Poseidon on the site, which was built of tufa, was probably destroyed in 480 BCE by Persian troops during Xerxes I's invasion of Greece. Although there is no direct evidence for Sounion, Xerxes certainly had the temple of Athena, and everything else on the Acropolis of Athens, razed as punishment for the Athenians' defiance. After they defeated Xerxes in the naval Battle of Salamis, the Athenians placed an entire captured enemy trireme (warship with three banks of oars) at Sounion as a trophy dedicated to Poseidon.

=== Placement ===
The temple of Poseidon at Sounion was constructed from 444 to 440 BCE. This was during the ascendancy of the Athenian statesman Pericles, who also rebuilt the Parthenon in Athens. The temple of Poseidon was built on the ruins of a temple dating from the Archaic period, about which the Greek geographer Strabo noted: "Geraistos [in Euboia] . . . is conveniently situated for those who are sailing across from Asia to Attica since it is near Sounion. It has a sanctuary (hieron) of Poseidon, the most notable of those in that part of the world, and also a noteworthy settlement."

The Greeks often chose temple locations that were physically related to or suggestive of the deity honored in the temples. Peak sanctuaries, for example, were often dedicated to Zeus, the god of the heavens and weather.

The choice of location was however also often influenced by practical considerations. According to the authors of Ancient Greece – Temples and Sanctuaries, the decision to build the temple at Sounion is clearly related to the visibility of the sea lanes to and from Piraeus, which provided the first and final vantage points from which incoming and exiting ships could be seen. The Cape of Sounion can be found on the coast of the Myrtoan Sea in the southern part of Greece.

Jessica Paga and Margaret M. Miles argue that the most plausible explanation for the location of the temple was connected with the increasing strength and prominence of the Athenian navy, coupled with the ongoing conflict of Athens with the islanders of Aegina and the threat to Athens from the Boeotians and Chalkidians in 506/5 BCE. The placement of the temple can be seen as serving both military and economic strategies. Cape Sounion, the most southern part of Attica, witnessed a lot of mercantile naval traffic. A temple there could also have served the purpose of surveillance for potential enemy attacks. According to archaeologists from the University of Vienna's Institute of Classical Archeology, the degree of access or accessibility of Sounion itself for Athenians and members of the cult of Poseidon from other demes remains unclear.

=== Construction ===
Secured by its own peribolos (court enclosed by a wall), propylaea (gateway), and two stoas (covered walkways or porticos), the construction of the ancient Temple of Poseidon around 490 BCE was likely a large investment made by the state of Athens. Between 508/7 and 480/79 BCE Athens is believed to have supported the founding and expansion of several sanctuaries in Attica, including those at Rhamnous, Mounychia in Piraeus, and Eleusis.

As mentioned above, one reason for the construction of the temple may have been militarily important and strategic location of the temple. Following the battle with the Persians at Marathon, the Athenians were weak and were vulnerable to a naval strike. Athens at the time faced nearby enemies, like the island of Aegina, that could have taken advantage of Athen's recovering army by attacking by sea. Therefore, Athens needed a lookout, for which Cape Sounion was the perfect place because anyone traveling by the coast of Attica needed to go around Cape Sounion. So construction of the temple right beside the water was a military tactic that secured an outpost in a highly trafficked area in order to keep tabs on the movements of enemies.

=== Cult activity ===
As indicated by literary and archaeological evidence, the "leveled summit" on the coast of Cape Sounion was likely a cult site from as early as the end of the 8th century BCE. Two cult centers dedicated to Athena and Poseidon respectively are believed to have been established by 700 BCE.

== Architecture ==
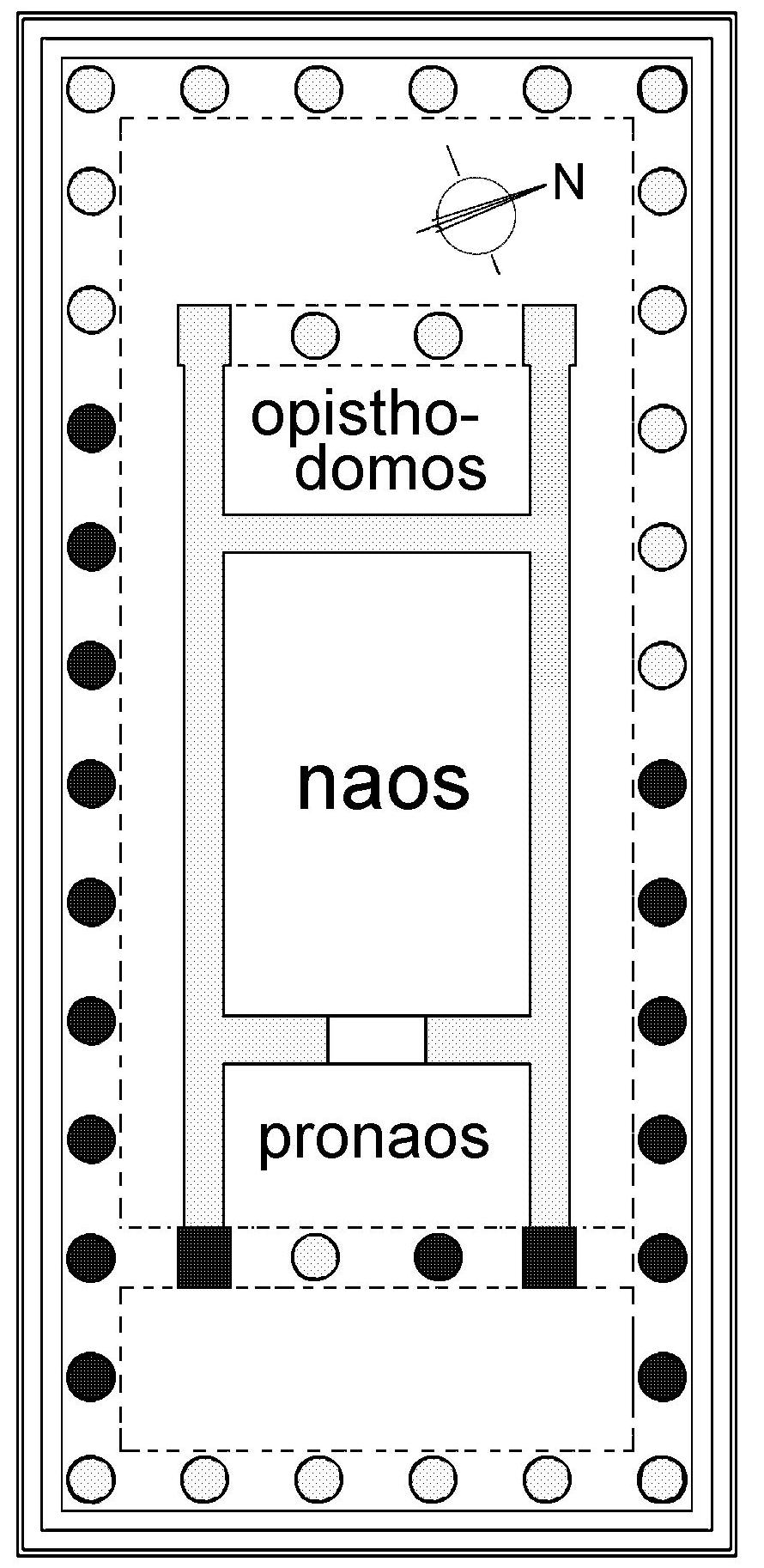
Floor plan

=== Physical layout ===
Excluding the corner blocks, each side of the temple was composed of twenty-three intermediate blocks. At the centre of the temple, beyond the colonnade, there would have been the hall of worship ('naos), a windowless rectangular room, similar to the partly intact hall at the Temple of Hephaestus. It would have contained, at one end facing the entrance, the cult image, a colossal, ceiling-height (6 metres (20 ft)) bronze statue of Poseidon. It has been found that the original plan for the temple was to construct 6x12 columns rather than the 6x13 columns that we find at the temple today, which was discovered by German archaeologist Wilhelm Dorpfeld. At the temple, it can be seen that there are large stretches of the paintings on the temple were preserved from erosion on the marble. The parts that did suffer erosion still have remnants of the outline of the art that once covered the surface.

=== Design ===
American architectural historian William Dinsmoor argues that the marble ceilings of the flanks of the temple are rare in the design of Greek temples. Of the slot type they presented having marble beams wider than the slots. The holes formed by this design were then enveloped by two thin slabs of marble. Similar to the architecture of the Hephaisteion, the temple of Hephaestus, the ceilings of the porches including those behind the end colonnades were of the coffer type and normal beam.

==== Materials ====
There are many materials that went into the construction of the temple at Sounion. The temple we see today is mainly made out of marble with an intricate taenia (the fancy borders on the ceiling). The marble is a marble from the Agrileza quarries. This type of marble was 'coarsed grained' meaning that it had a rougher texture than smooth, shiny marble. What makes the Temple of Poseidon at Sounion so interesting is that it was built on top of another old temple. The materials that the older temple was made out of was limestone, which was also integrated into the structure of the current remains of the temple. This was discovered in 1884 by German archeologist Wilhelm Dorpfeld. He found that the new temple, considered Classical, was built on top of another temple from a different time period regarded as the Archaic period. When building the new temple on top of the old, the marble was laid on top of the old limestone crepidoma, in a way that enveloped it. The Archaic period dates back to 800 BCE to 650 BCE, a period of time that began after the Persians left Greece. The classical period dates from 480 to 323 BCE.

=== Observable features ===
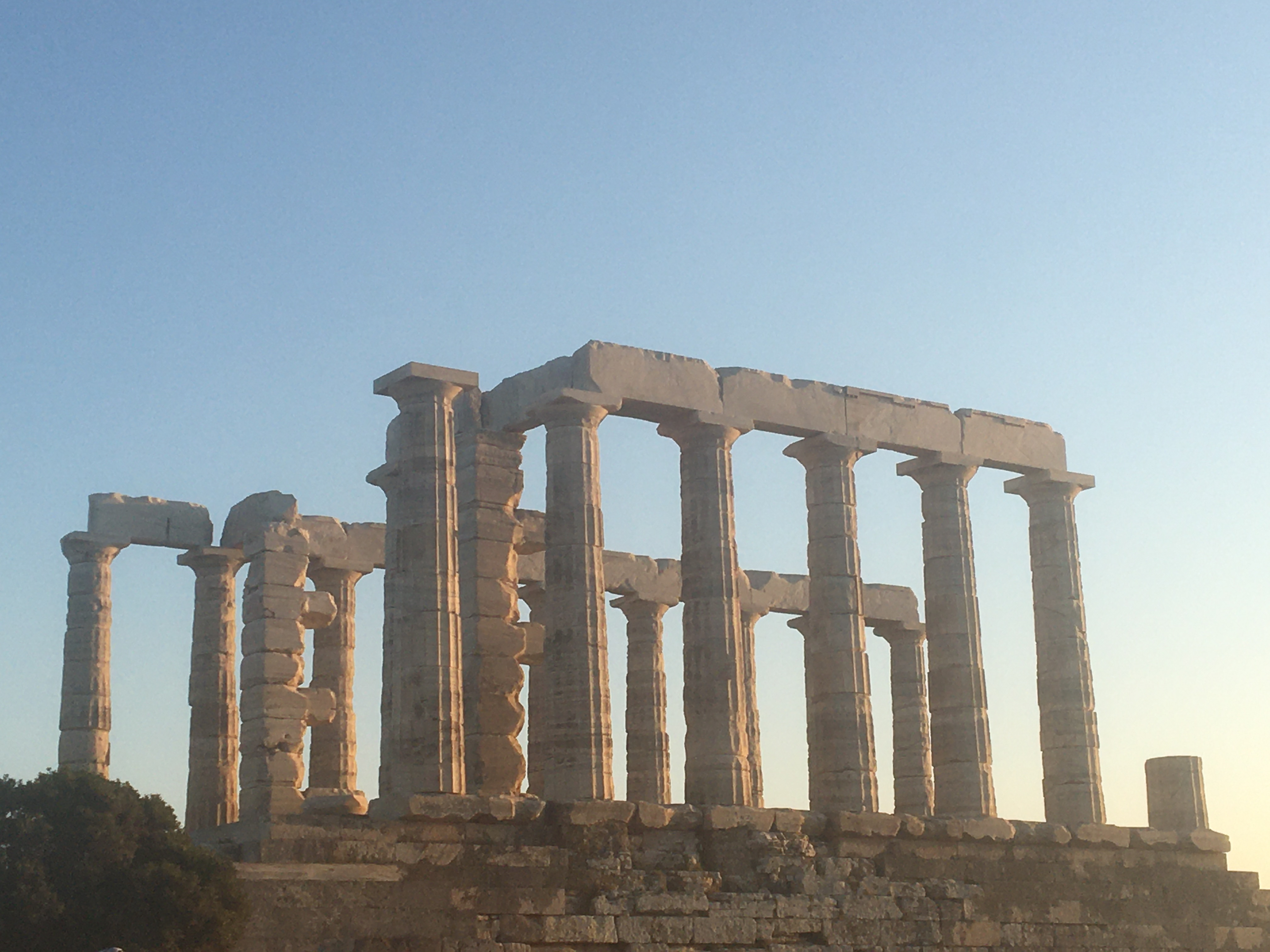
Temple of Poseidon in 2022

==== Crepidoma ====
Two euthynteria blocks of the archaic temple remain somewhat visible and in situ lying beneath the southeast corner of the modern version of the temple. Their overall dimensions are difficult to determine given the overlap between modern limestone and ancient marble. There are visible indentations, however, from what were likely close-tined claw-tooth chisels. With nineteen individual step blocks along the east and south sides of the temple, these blocks remain distinguishable by the consistency in length, height, lifting bosses, and chamfered edges. Several of these blocks appear discolored, providing a potential indication of burning.

==== The colonnades ====
At least forty-one column limestone drums have been identified. Several of these drums contain cuttings that are diverse in their depth and size, ranging from 6.5 to 7.5 centimetres (2.6 to 3.0 in) per side. At least one third of the column drums possess an articulated band that were likely used to properly arrange and align the drums into the correct placement or order within the column shaft.

== Archaeology ==
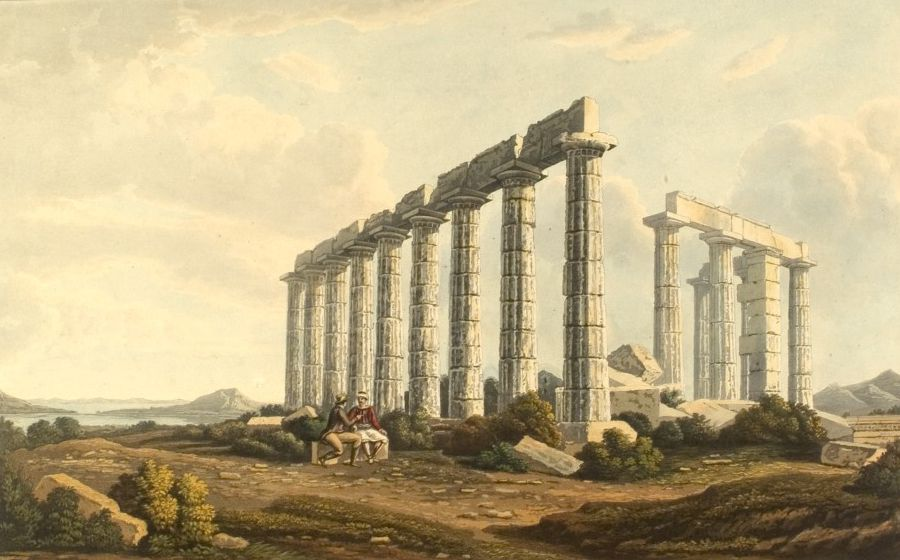
Painting from Edward Dodwell, Views of Greece (1821)

=== Excavations by Valerios Stais ===
Executed between 1897 and 1915, Valerios Stais’ excavations of the Temple of Poseidon and the Temple of Athena at Sounion were, and continue to remain, the most elaborate and thorough excavations of these sites. As a result of his excavation, Stais uncovered a significant array of pottery, which included terracotta relief and painted plaques, small, terracotta sculptures, seals, scarabs, faience amulets, and metal objects that were likely remnants of jewelry or weapons. Stais also uncovered inscriptions that offered greater insight into who the temples were built for, falsifying Pausanias’ claim that the temple on the cliff was dedicated to the goddess Athena, rather than the god Poseidon. In his excavations of both the Temple of Poseidon at Sounion and the Temple of Athena at Sounion, Stais found large pits (bothros) filled with fragments of marble sculptures and remnants of votive offerings, leading him to believe that these remains came as a result of the destruction of both temples by the Persians in 479.

==== Terracotta and plaques ====
Around the temple, there are many remnants of pottery, terracotta artifacts, and other handmade ceramics. Votives in ancient Greece were a symbol and a representation that one visited and was present at the temple. The votives served as an offering to the god to whom the temple was dedicated. Notable remnants found at the temple are three plaques that each depict different images. One is believed that one figure is a god because it has wings. Another plaque has an image of a piece of clothing called a chiton that was used by both men and women during that time period. This second plaque however does not show the entire figure, so it is unknown if it is male or female because only the lower half is depicted. The last one is the image of a male and it is believed that it due to the characteristics of the man, he was a chariot driver, also known as a charioteer.

==== Bothros ====
Of particular significance of the bothros he uncovered was in 1907, just outside the old polygonal wall at the south-east corner of the sanctuary. Inside the bothros were a variety of offerings including scarabs and seals, terracotta relief plaques, pottery, and faience figurines, the majority of which could be dated from the late eighth to the early 5th century BC.

The most significant of these offerings is the intricate metalwork. Consisting of twenty four copper based artifacts found not too far from the Laurion mines, it is very possible that several of these objects were produced locally. These artifacts include a human figurine depicting a warrior god from the east with two spiral rings, dating from the 8th century BC, the sculpture of bull from the mid-7th century, and a cylinder shaped bead, six functional arrowheads, seven plain-finger rings, a pair of tweezers and a nail cap, one ex-voto double axe, and one ex-voto spearhead all from the 7th-6th centuries BC.

==== Zoomorphic figurines ====
Zoomorphic figurines also compose a large portion of the offerings uncovered in the bothros. At least two thirds of those found are chariot groups and horses with and without a rider. The remaining third of figurines includes bovines, goats, rams, a dove, and a dog.

=== Archaic temple ===
In 1884, Wilhelm Dörpfeld conducted a systematic excavation of the area surrounding the Temple of Poseidon. Of his most significant findings, Dörpfeld uncovered the remnants of a previous Archaic limestone temple beneath the modern Temple of Poseidon. This led Dörpfeld to argue that the previous temple had been demolished by the Persians in 480/479 BC, thereby providing explanations for the archaic temple's unfluted columns, lack of a roof, and evidence of a tremendous fire. During his excavations, Valerios Stais uncovered part of the inner foundation that likely supported an interior colonnade of the previous temple. According to archaeologists Jessica Paga and Margaret M. Miles, although not complete in its construction at the time of its demise, this archaic temple possessed measurements (ca. 13.06 by 30.20 metres (42.8 ft × 99.1 ft)). that are consistent with today's temple. The Archaic temple, before its destruction, is likely to have been considerably close to being completed. Archaeologists have found that the Archaic temple may have had at least its walls up before it was destroyed. The construction is believed to have reached to geison-level, and possibly have been partially roofed with just the wooden structure. It is very likely that the Archaic temple's peristyle was as tall as the geison and columns of the current temple. The Archaic temple and modern temple share very similar features and dimensions. However, the modern temple was constructed just slightly large enough to cover the crepidoma of the old temple. The crepidoma is the slightly raised structure at the base of a Greek temple, which are considered as the steps that lead into the temple. Based upon its architectural style, this earlier temple was likely constructed sometime around the first quarter of the 5th century.

==== Demise ====
Some archaeologists have argued that disaster struck the Archaic temple (at an unknown date). Staїs, for example, theorizes that the temple's collapse could have been due to the strength of high winds or by an earthquake. Based upon the architectural style of the remains, archaeologists argue that the archaic temple was built around 500 BC. It is worth noting that the construction of such an extravagant building likely required the receiving of funds and administrative support from central Athens. Given the evidence of advanced organizations dedicated to administration and finances, Athens was likely capable of supporting the construction of these temples.

== Current situation ==
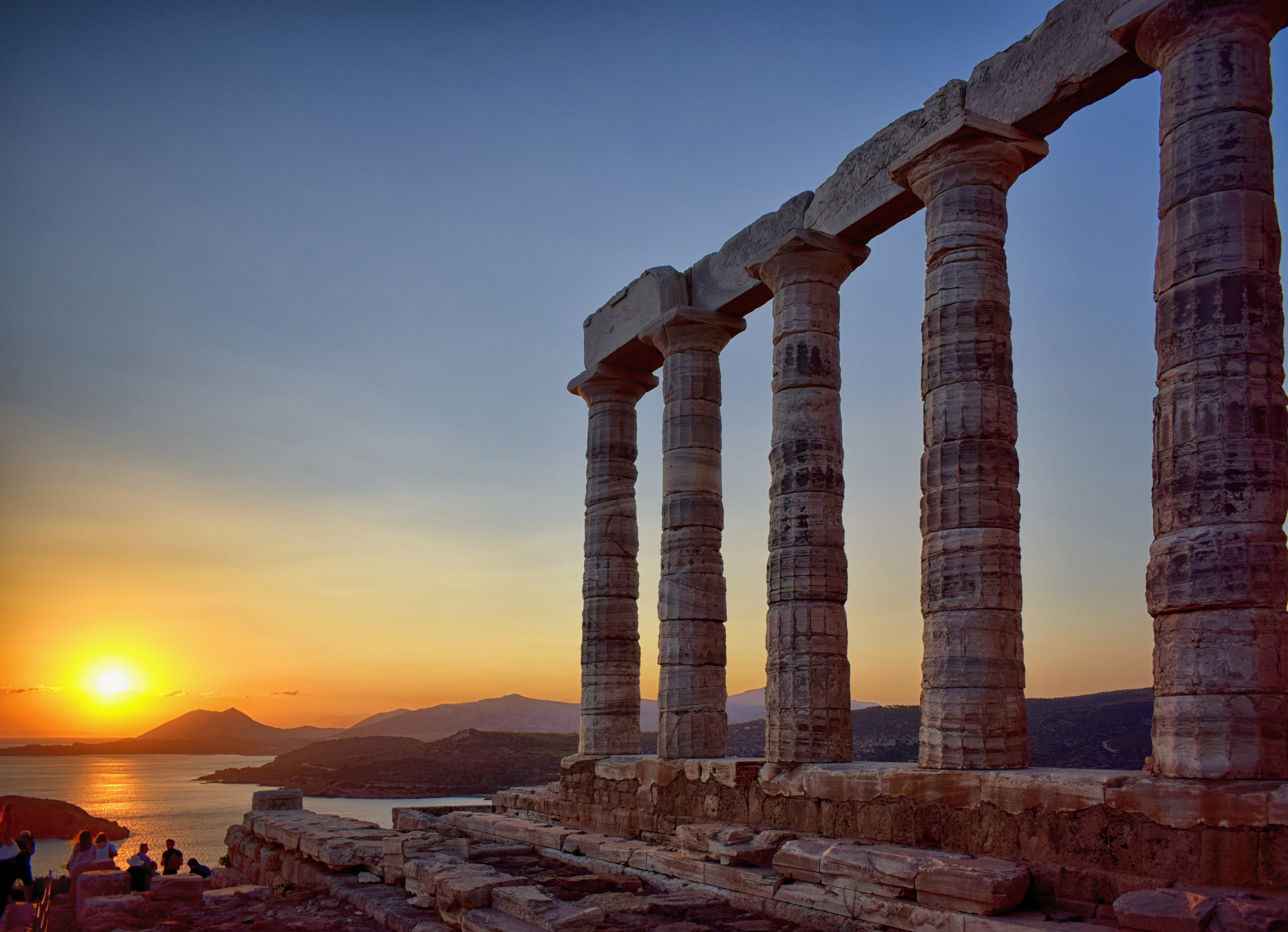
The temple at sunset

=== Visitor accessibility ===
According to the Ministry of Culture and Sports, the sanctuary is open to visitors during the winter and summer seasons, from 9:30 am to sunset. Free admission days include the sixth of March (to remember and honor Melina Mercouri), International Monuments Day (April 18), International Museums Day (May 18), the last weekend of September every year, October 28, and the first Sunday of the month beginning November 1 to March 31. The full price of admission is €20 and the €10. The sanctuary is closed on March 25 in celebration of Greek Independence Day.

=== Columns in Venice and England ===
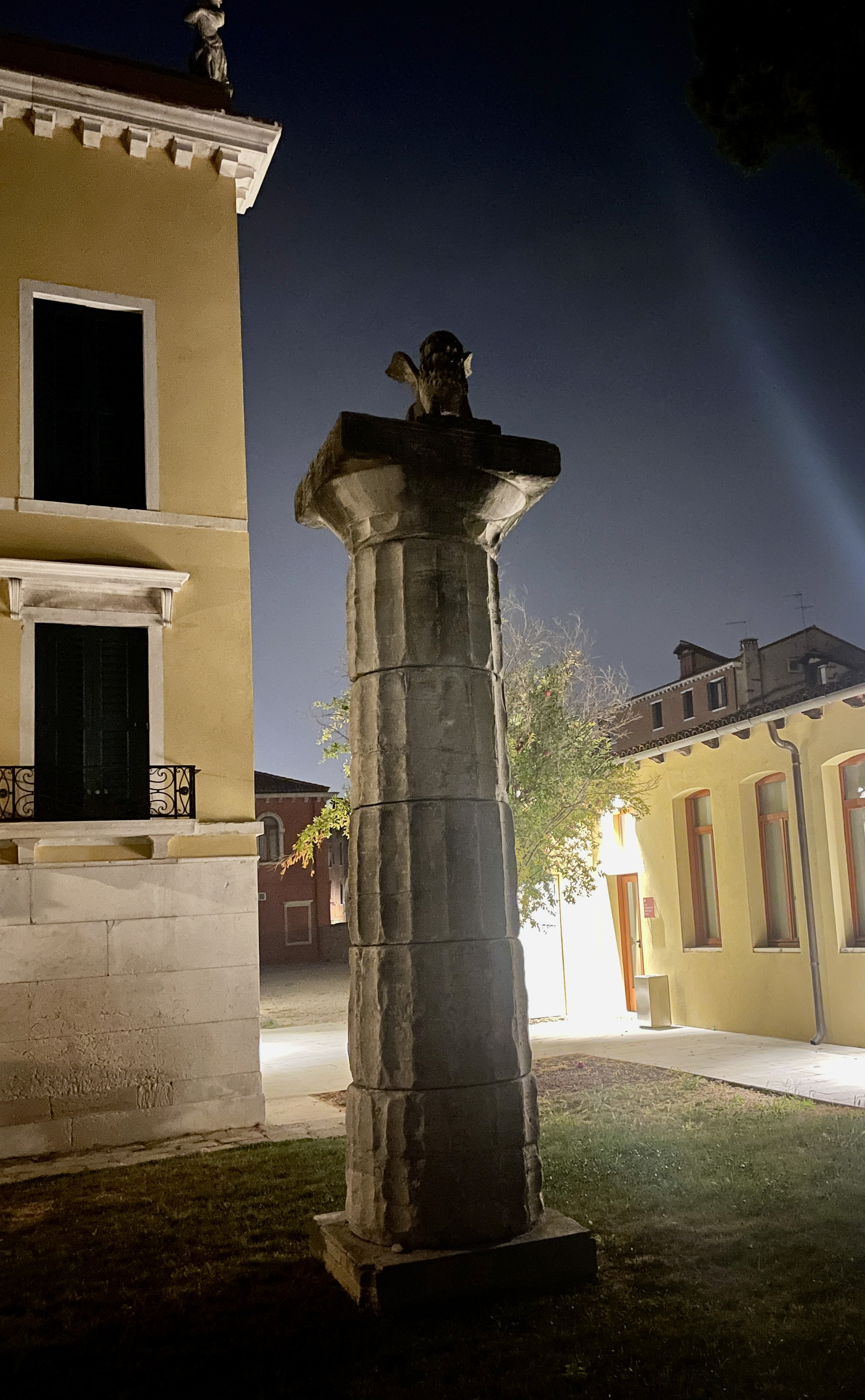
Temple column, now in Venice

In 1825, two columns of the temple collapsed. At least one of the two, the fifth from the northeast corner, was dismantled on the orders of Amilcare Paulucci, commander of the Imperial Austrian Navy, and taken to the Venetian Arsenal in 1826. Five of the eight original drums and the column capital were afterwards reassembled and placed in the garden of a neoclassical palazzo on Fondamenta Briati (45°26′01″N 12°19′15″E), part of the Ca' Foscari University of Venice. The blocks bear a number of modern inscriptions, including by French sailors: "Le Zefire Bric Du ROI 1816".

From the column, an intact pair of wooden dowels, inscribed ΕΥΘΥ and Ε in early-to-mid-5th century BCE lettering, was recovered and placed on display in the Seminario Patriarcale in Venice. The current location is unknown.

Currently there are five known column drums of the temple located in England. Four drums are displayed in the garden of Chatsworth House as a base of a bust of the sixth Duke of Devonshire. They are presumably the bottom, third, fourth and the sixth drum taken from a single column. The British Museum preserves another one which is probably the seventh drum of the same column.

== See also ==
- Column of the Temple of Poseidon at Chatsworth
