= Joseph Paxton =

English gardener, architect and Member of Parliament

Sir Joseph Paxton
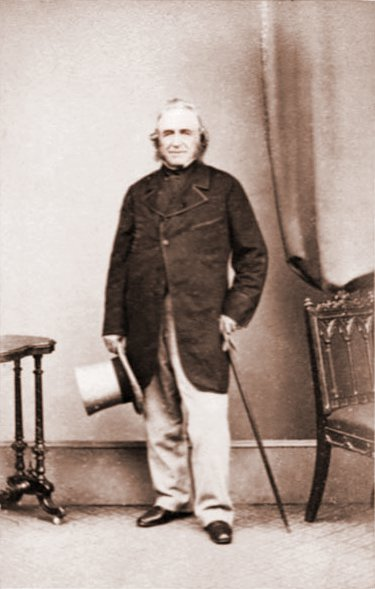
- Sir Joseph Paxton
- Born: 3 August 1803; Bedfordshire, England
- Died: 8 June 1865 (aged 61); Sydenham, London, England
- Occupation: Architect

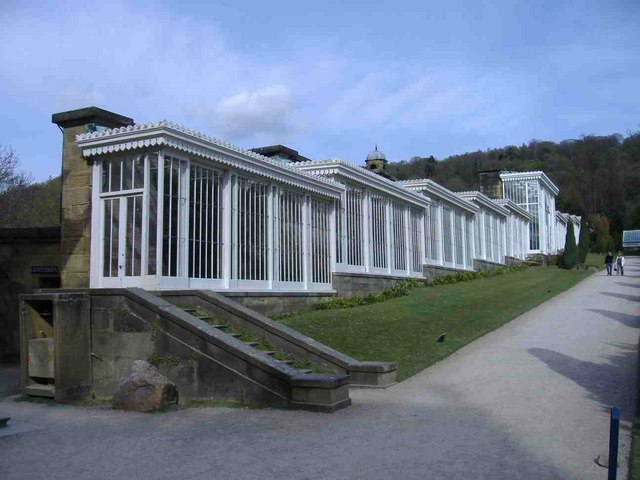
The Conservative Wall at Chatsworth

Sir Joseph Paxton (3 August 1803 – 8 June 1865) was an English gardener, architect, engineer and Liberal Member of Parliament. He is best known for designing the Crystal Palace, which was built in Hyde Park, London to house the Great Exhibition of 1851, the first world's fair, great public parks such as Birkenhead Park, and for cultivating the Cavendish banana, the most consumed banana in the Western world.

== Early life ==
Paxton was born in 1803, the seventh son of a farming family, in Milton Bryan, Bedfordshire. Some references, incorrectly, list his birth year as 1801. This is, as he admitted in later life, a result of misinformation he provided in his teens, which enabled him to enrol at Chiswick Gardens. He became a garden boy at the age of fifteen for Sir Gregory Osborne Page-Turner at Battlesden Park, near Woburn. After several moves, he obtained a position in 1823 at the Horticultural Society's Chiswick Gardens.

== Chatsworth ==
The Horticultural Society's gardens were close to the gardens of William Cavendish, 6th Duke of Devonshire, at Chiswick House. The duke met the young gardener as he strolled in his gardens and became impressed with his skill and enthusiasm. He offered the 20-year-old Paxton the position of head gardener at Chatsworth, which was considered one of the finest landscaped gardens of the time.

Although the duke was in Russia, Paxton set off for Chatsworth on the Chesterfield coach arriving at Chatsworth at half past four in the morning. By his own account he had explored the gardens after scaling the kitchen garden wall, set the staff to work, eaten breakfast with the housekeeper and met his future wife, Sarah Bown, the housekeeper's niece, completing his first morning's work before nine o'clock. He married Bown in 1827, and she proved capable of managing his affairs, leaving him free to pursue his ideas.

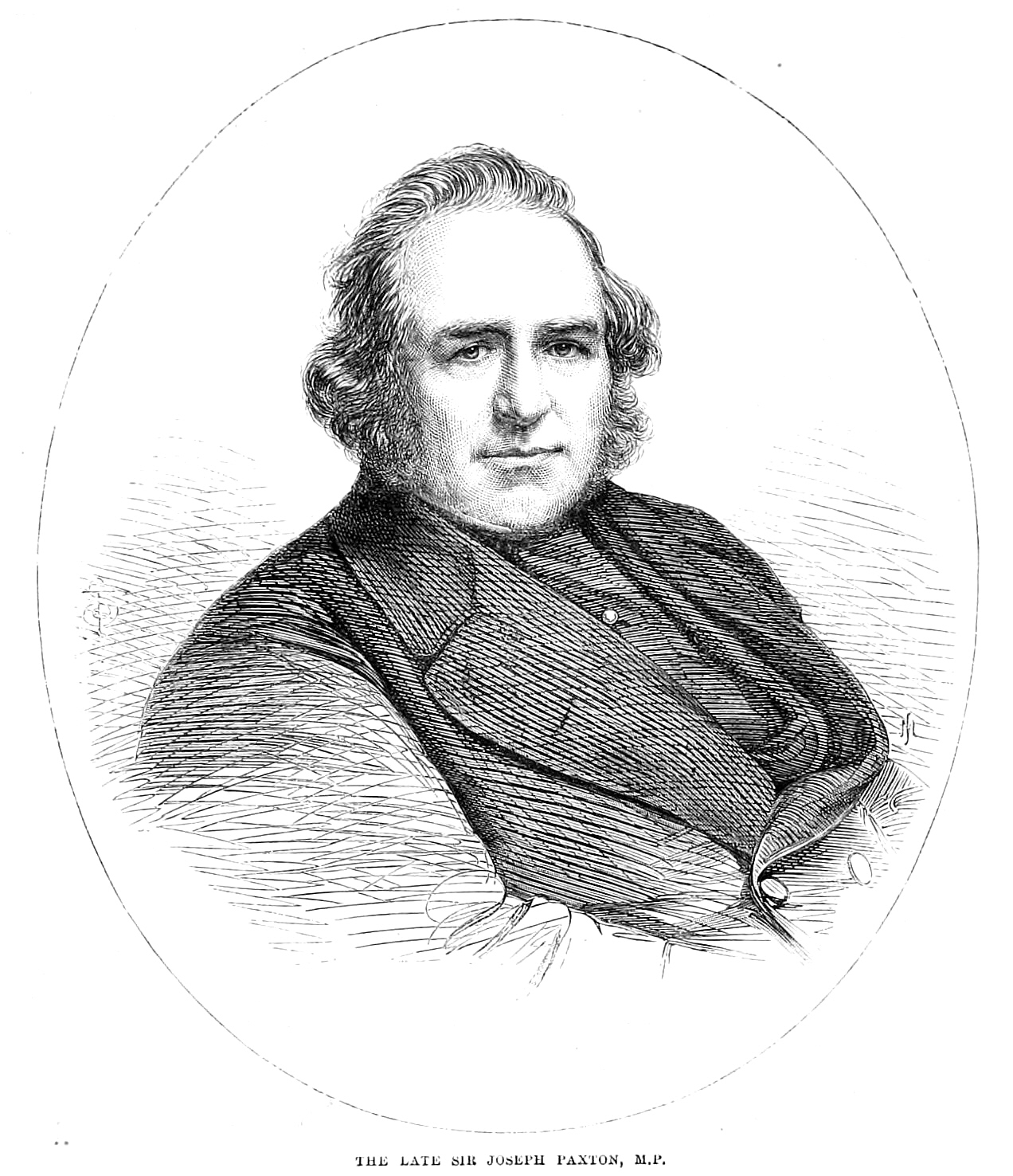
Portrait of Paxton in The Illustrated London News, 1865

He enjoyed a friendly relationship with his employer who recognised his diverse talents and facilitated his rise to prominence.

One of Paxton's first projects was to redesign the garden around the new north wing of the house and expand Chatsworth's collection of conifers into a 40-acre (160,000 m^{2}) arboretum which still exists. He became skilled at moving mature trees. The largest, weighing about eight tons, was moved from Kedleston Road in Derby. Among several other large projects at Chatsworth were the rock garden, the Emperor Fountain, and rebuilding Edensor village. The Emperor Fountain was built in 1844; it was twice the height of Nelson's Column and required the creation of a feeder lake on the hill above the gardens necessitating the excavation of 100,000 yd^{3} (76,000 m^{3}) of earth.

=== Greenhouses ===
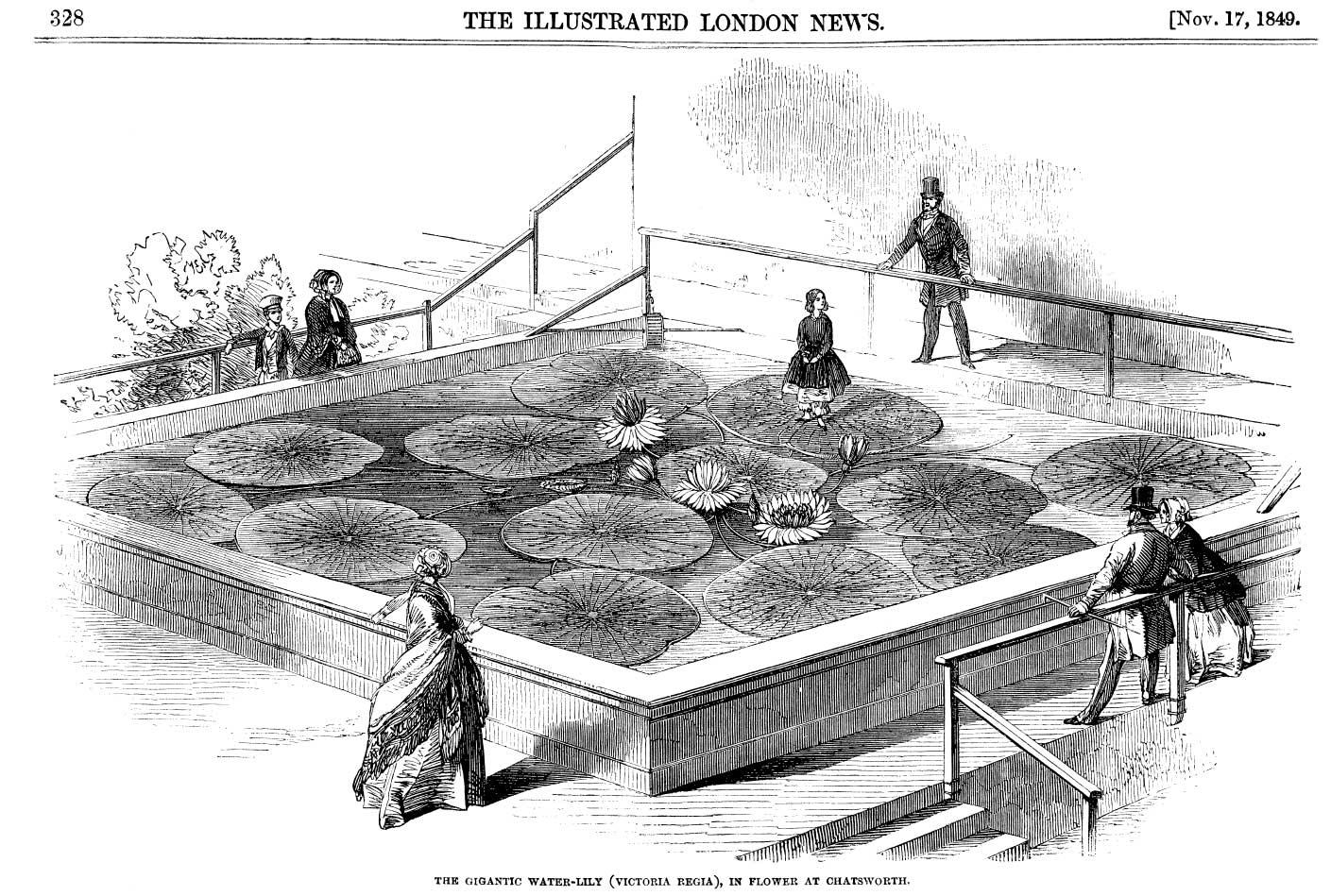
Annie Paxton standing on a Victoria amazonica leaf in the lily house; Paxton's design for the Crystal Palace took its cue from the organic structure of this plant.

In 1832, Paxton developed an interest in greenhouses at Chatsworth where he designed a series of buildings with "forcing frames" for espalier trees and for the cultivation of exotic plants such as highly prized pineapples. At the time the use of glass houses was in its infancy and those at Chatsworth were dilapidated. After experimentation, he designed a glass house with a ridge and furrow roof that would be at right angles to the morning and evening sun and an ingenious frame design that would admit maximum light: the forerunner of the modern greenhouse.

The next great building at Chatsworth was built for the first seeds of the Victoria regia lily which had been sent to Kew from the Amazon in 1836. Although they had germinated and grown they had not flowered and in 1849 a seedling was given to Paxton to try out at Chatsworth. He entrusted it to Eduard Ortgies, a young gardener and within two months the leaves were 4.5 ft (1.4 m) in diameter, and a month later it flowered. It continued growing and it became necessary to build a much larger house, the Victoria Regia House. Inspired by the waterlily's huge leaves – 'a natural feat of engineering' – he found the structure for his conservatory which he tested by floating his daughter Annie on a leaf. The secret was in the rigidity provided by the radiating ribs connecting with flexible cross-ribs. Constant experimentation over a number of years led him to devise the glasshouse design that inspired the Crystal Palace.

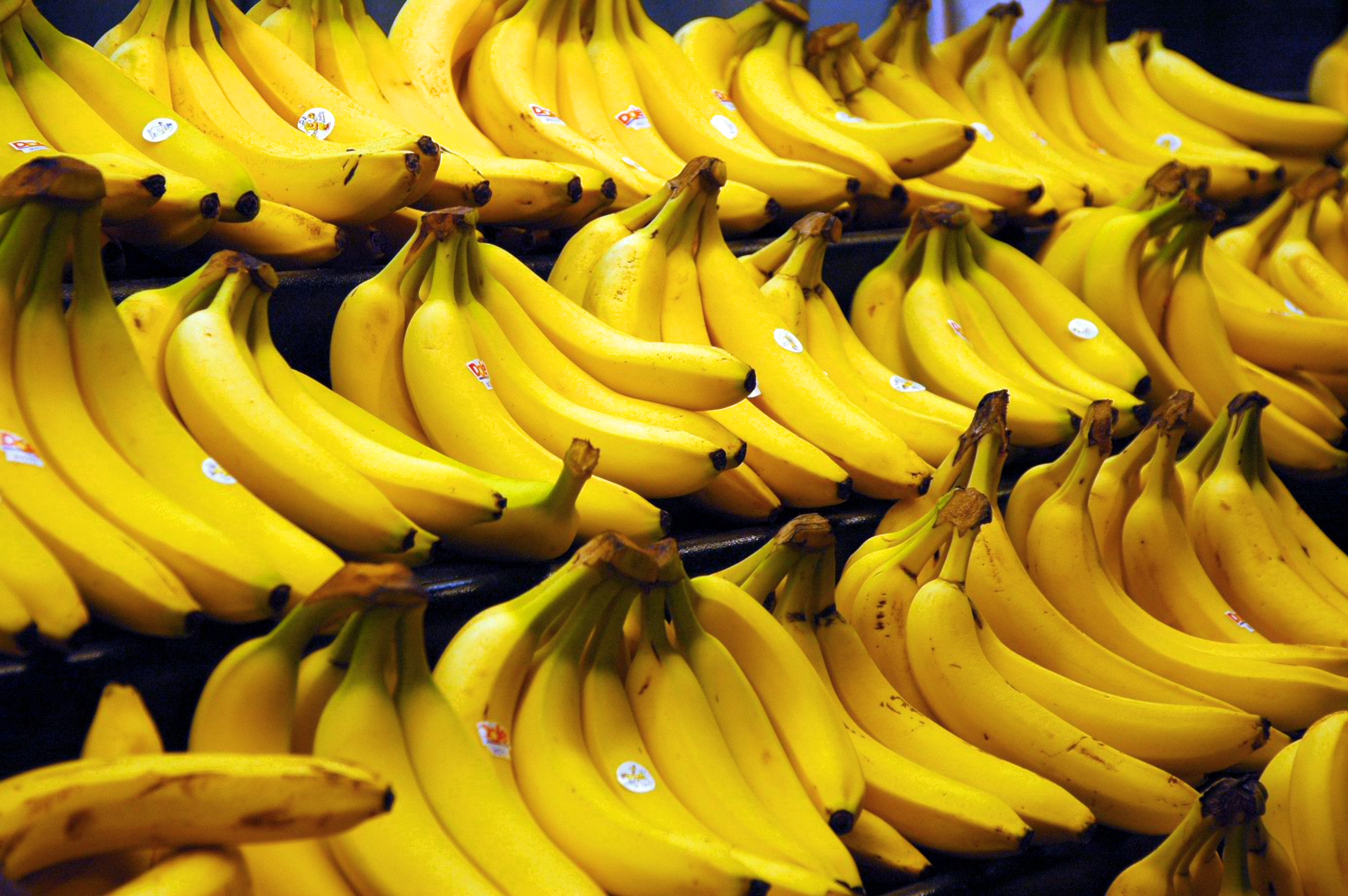
Named after William Cavendish, Cavendish bananas were cultivated by Paxton in the greenhouses of Chatsworth House in 1836. They account for the vast majority of bananas consumed in the western world.

With a cheap and light wooden frame, the conservatory design had a ridge-and-furrow roof to let in more light and drained rainwater away. He used hollow pillars doubling as drain pipes and designed a special rafter that acted as an internal and external gutter. All the elements were pre-fabricated and, like modular buildings, could be produced in vast numbers and assembled into buildings of varied design.

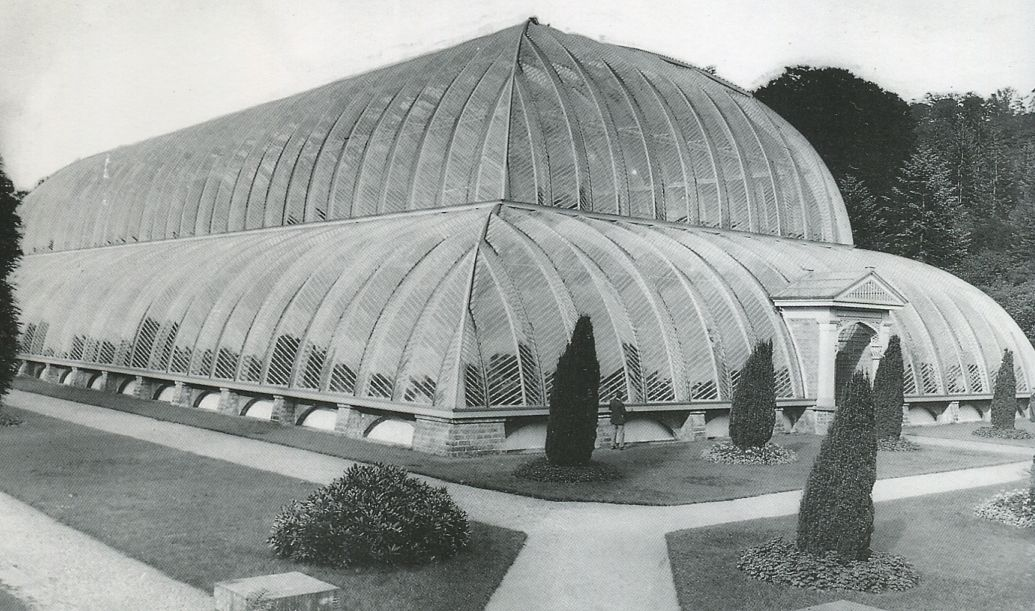
Great Conservatory at Chatsworth, built from 1836 to 1841 and demolished in the 1920s.

In 1836, Paxton began construction of the Great Conservatory, or Stove, a huge glasshouse 227 ft (69 m) long and 123 ft (37 m) wide that was designed by the 6th Duke's architect Decimus Burton. The columns and beams were made of cast iron, and the arched elements of laminated wood. At the time, the conservatory was the largest glass building in the world. The largest sheet glass available at that time, made by Robert Lucas Chance, was 3 ft (0.91 m) long. Chance produced 4 ft (1.2 m) sheets for Paxton's benefit. The structure was heated by eight boilers using seven miles (11 km) of iron pipe and cost more than £30,000. It had a central carriageway and when the Queen was driven through, it was lit with twelve thousand lamps. It was prohibitively expensive to maintain, and was not heated during the First World War. The plants died and it was demolished in the 1920s.

In 1848, Paxton created the Conservative Wall, a glass house 331 ft (101 m) long by 7 ft (2.1 m) wide.

== Crystal Palace ==
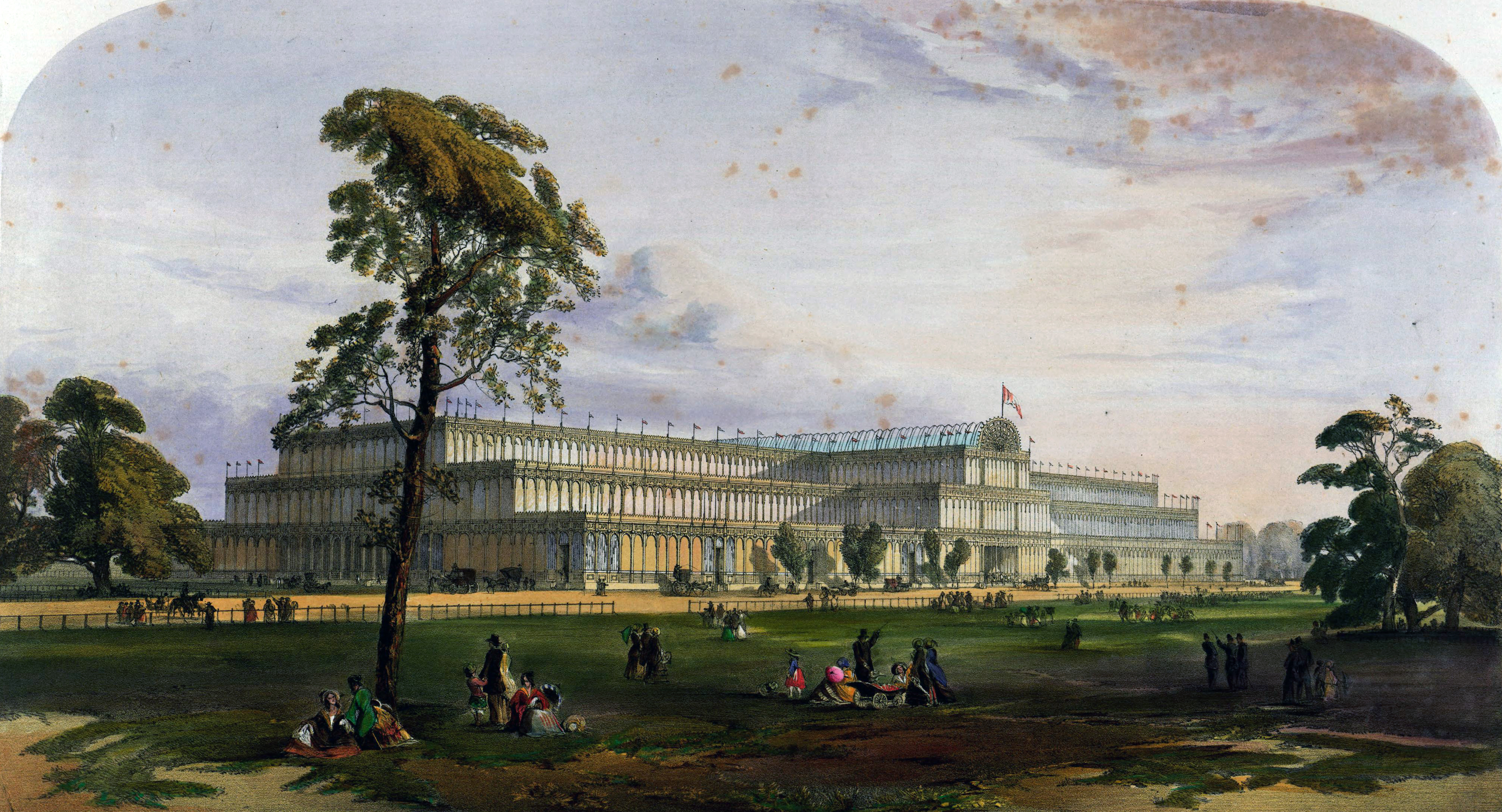
The 1851 Great Exhibition in Hyde Park .

The Great Conservatory was the test-bed for the prefabricated glass and iron structural techniques which Paxton pioneered and would employ for his masterpiece: The Crystal Palace of the Great Exhibition of 1851. These techniques were made physically possible by recent technological advances in the manufacture of both glass and cast iron, and financially possible by the dropping of a tax on glass.

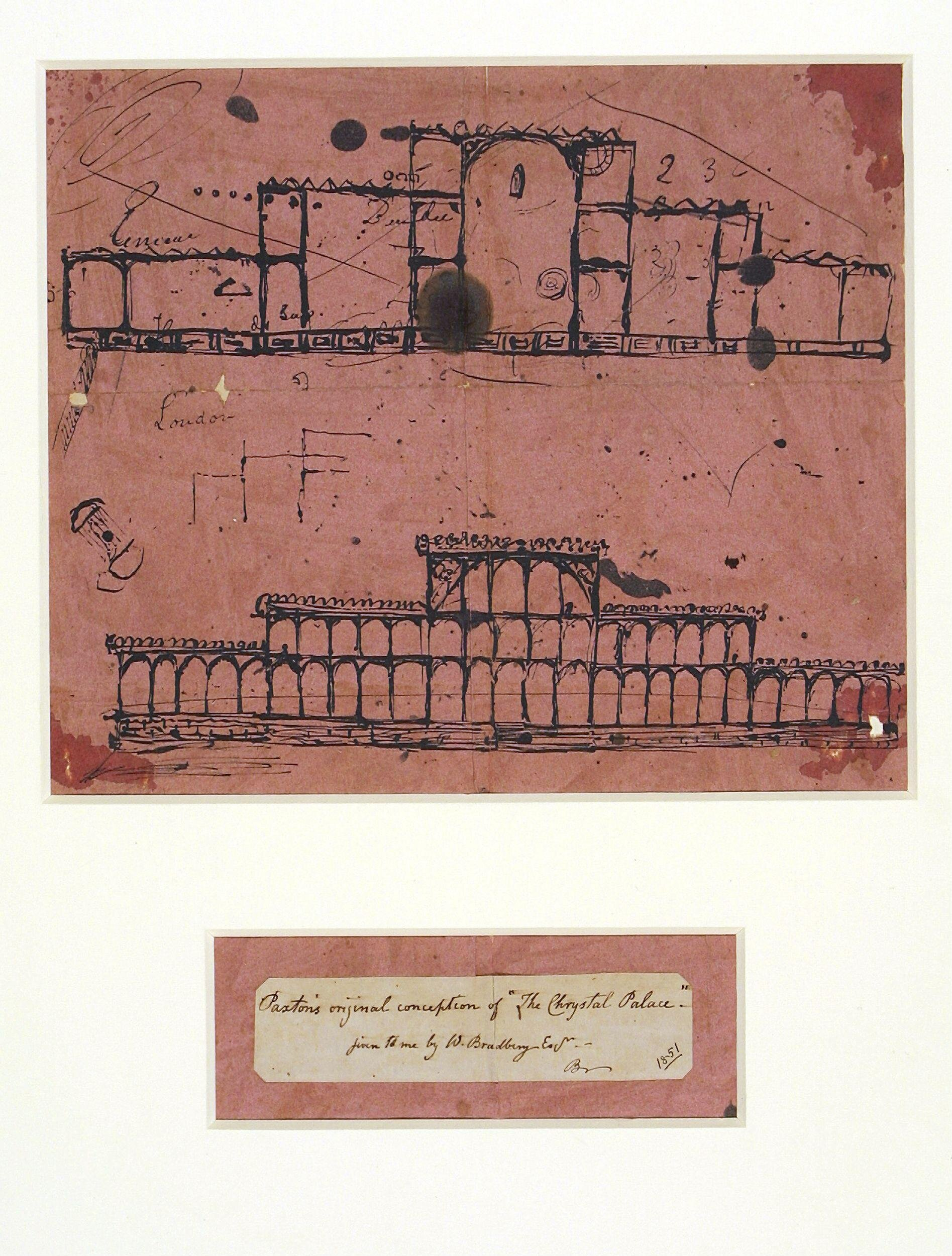
Sir Joseph Paxton (1803–65), Facsimile of the First Sketch for the Great Exhibition Building, About 1850, Pen and ink on blotting paper V&A Museum no. E.941–1983 Victoria and Albert Museum, London

In 1850 the Royal Commission appointed to organise the Great Exhibition were in a quandary. An international competition to design a building to house the Exhibition had produced 245 designs, of which only two were remotely suitable, and all would take too long to build and would be too permanent. There was an outcry by the public and in Parliament against the desecration of Hyde Park.

Paxton was visiting London in his capacity as a director of the Midland Railway to meet the chairman John Ellis who was also a member of parliament. He happened to mention an idea he had for the hall, and Ellis promptly encouraged to produce some plans, provided they could be ready in nine days. Unfortunately he was committed for the next few days, but at a board meeting of the railway in Derby, it is said he appeared to be spending much of his time doodling on a sheet of blotting paper. At the end of the meeting he held up his first sketch of the Crystal Palace, inspired by the Victoria Regia House. The sketch is now in the Victoria and Albert Museum.

He completed the plans and presented them to the Commission, but there was opposition from some members, since another design was well into its planning stage. Paxton decided to by-pass the Commission and published the design in the Illustrated London News to universal acclaim.

Its novelty was its revolutionary modular, prefabricated design, and use of glass. Glazing was carried out from special trolleys, and was fast: one man managed to fix 108 panes in a single day. The Palace was 1,848 ft (563 m) long, 408 ft (124 m) wide and 108 ft (33 m) high. It required 4,500 tons of iron, 60,000 ft^{2} (5,600 m^{2}) of timber and needed over 293,000 panes of glass. Yet it took 2,000 men just eight months to build, and cost just £79,800. Quite unlike any other building, it was itself a demonstration of British technology in iron and glass. In its construction, Paxton was assisted by Charles Fox, also of Derby for the iron framework, and William Cubitt, Chairman of the Building Committee. All three were knighted. After the exhibition they were employed by the Crystal Palace Company to move it to Sydenham where it remained until it was destroyed by fire in 1936.

== Public park design ==
Paxton played a pioneering role in the development of public parks in the United Kingdom, helping to shape the early phases of the public parks movement. In the 1830s, he landscaped the Serpentine Walks (along the River Wye) in Buxton for the 6th Duke of Devonshire, on what was previously the private gardens of Buxton Old Hall. This was incorporated into the 1871 design for Buxton Pavilion Gardens. While continuing his duties at Chatsworth, he accepted commissions for urban park design that would have a lasting influence on landscape architecture. His first such project was in 1842, when he designed Prince's Park in Liverpool, a semi-private development commissioned by Richard Vaughan Yates.

However, it was with his layout for Birkenhead Park in 1843 that Paxton made his most significant contribution to public green space. Birkenhead Park is widely acknowledged as one of the earliest publicly funded civic parks in Britain, and its design strongly influenced the American landscape architect Frederick Law Olmsted, who visited the site in 1850 and later incorporated many of its principles into Central Park in New York City.

In addition to Birkenhead, Paxton designed several other urban parks that reflected his approach to accessible green space, including the People's Park in Halifax, parkland in Glasgow, and the landscaped grounds of The Spa, Scarborough. In 1863, he designed Baxter Park in Dundee, a 37-acre public green space gifted to the city by linen manufacturer Sir David Baxter and his sisters; it remains the only complete park wholly designed by Paxton in Scotland. His contribution to civic space also extended to burial grounds: in October 1845, he was invited to lay out one of the country's first municipal cemeteries in Coventry. This became the London Road Cemetery, a site that included ornamental landscaping and a chapelry, and where a memorial to Paxton by sculptor Joseph Goddard was later erected in 1868.

== Publishing ==
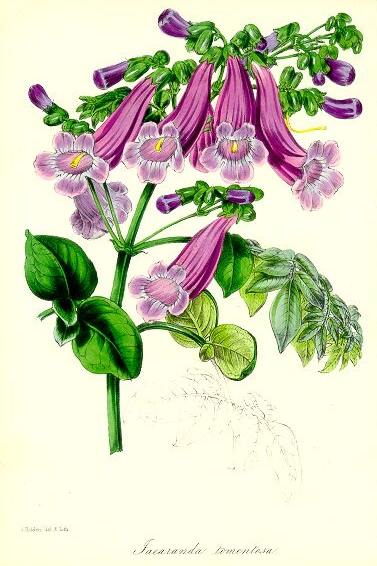
Jacaranda jasminoides, plate by Paxton, published in his "Magazine of Botany"

In 1831, Paxton published a monthly magazine, The Horticultural Register. This was followed by the Magazine of Botany in 1834, the Pocket Botanical Dictionary in 1840, Paxton's Flower Garden (vols. I & II) in 1850 and the Calendar of Gardening Operations. In addition to these titles he also, in 1841, co-founded perhaps the most famous horticultural periodical, The Gardeners' Chronicle along with John Lindley, Charles Wentworth Dilke and William Bradbury, and later became its editor.

== List of selected publications ==
- Paxton, Sir Joseph (1868) [1840]. A Pocket Botanical Dictionary, comprising the names, history, and culture of all plants known in Britain, with a full explanation of technical terms. By J. Paxton, assisted by Professor Lindley. Samuel Hereman (revision) (Revised ed.).

== Political career ==
Paxton was a Liberal Member of Parliament for Coventry from 1854 until his death in 1865.

In June 1855 he presented a scheme he called the Great Victorian Way to the Parliamentary Select Committee on Metropolitan Communications in which he envisaged the construction of an arcade, based on the structure of the Crystal Palace, in a ten-mile loop around the centre of London. It would have incorporated a roadway, an atmospheric railway, housing and shops.

== Later life ==
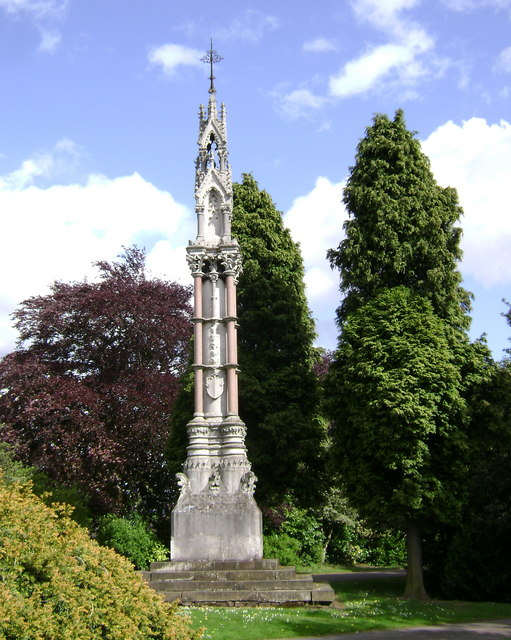
The Paxton Memorial at London Road Cemetery, Coventry

Although he remained the Head Gardener at Chatsworth until 1858, Paxton was also able to undertake outside work such as the Crystal Palace and his directorship of the Midland Railway. He worked on public parks in Liverpool, Birkenhead, Glasgow, Halifax (the People's Park) and the grounds of The Spa, Scarborough. In October 1845 he was invited to lay out one of the country's first municipal burial grounds in Coventry. This became the London Road Cemetery, where a memorial to Paxton by Joseph Goddard was erected in 1868.

Between 1835 and 1839, he organised plant-hunting expeditions, one of which ended in tragedy when two gardeners from Chatsworth sent to California drowned. Tragedy also struck at home when his eldest son died.

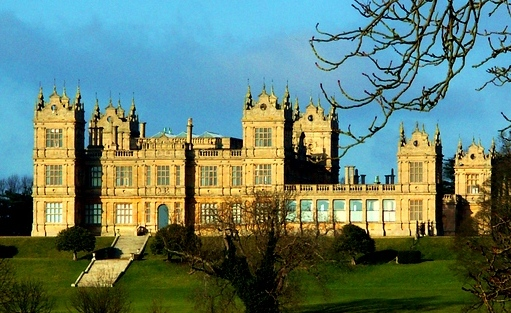
Mentmore Towers

In 1850, Paxton was commissioned by Baron Mayer Amschel de Rothschild to design Mentmore Towers in Buckinghamshire. This became one of the greatest country houses built during the Victorian Era. Following the completion of Mentmore, James Mayer de Rothschild, one of Baron de Rothschild's French cousins, commissioned Château de Ferrières at Ferrières-en-Brie near Paris to be "Another Mentmore, but twice the size". Both buildings still stand today.

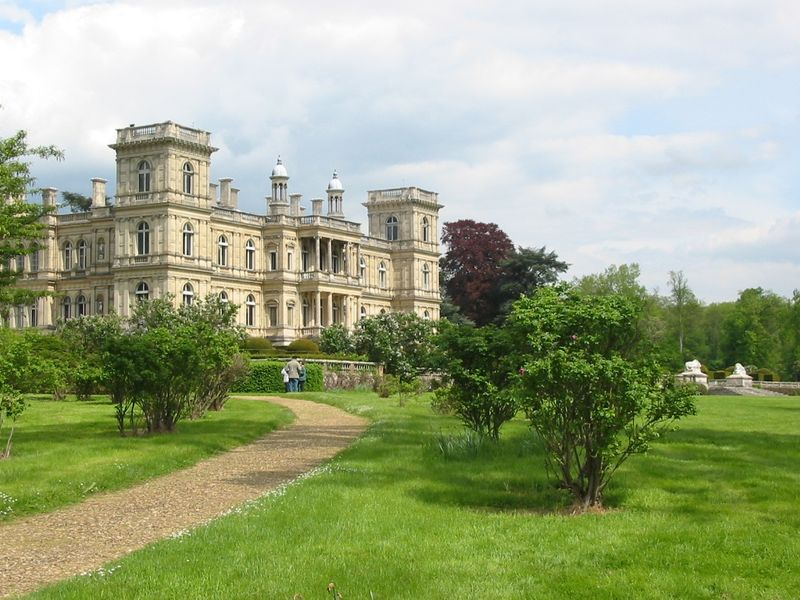
Château de Ferrières

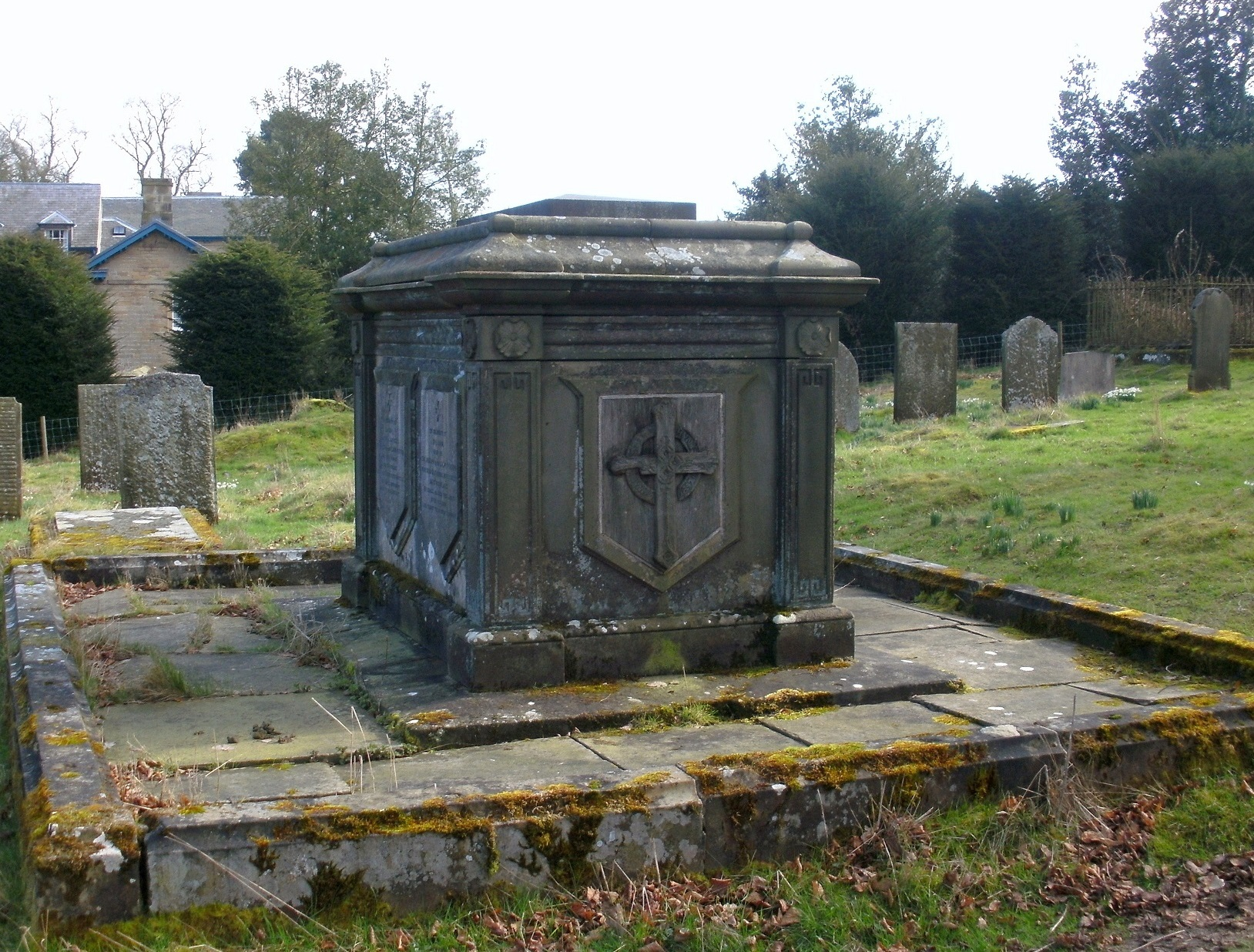
St Peter's Churchyard, Edensor - grave of Sir Joseph Paxton (1803–1865)

Paxton also designed another country house, a smaller version of Mentmore, at Battlesden near Woburn in Bedfordshire. This house was bought by the Duke of Bedford thirty years after its completion, and demolished, because the Duke wanted no other mansion close to Woburn Abbey.

In 1860, Paxton also designed Fairlawn, 89 Wimbledon Park Side, for Sir Edwin Saunders, Queen Victoria's dentist.

Paxton was honoured by being a member of the Kew Commission, which was to suggest improvements for Royal Botanic Gardens, and by being considered for the post of Head Gardener at Windsor Castle.

On 17 March 1860, during the enthusiasm for the Volunteer movement, Paxton raised and commanded the 11th (Matlock) Derbyshire Rifle Volunteer Corps.

Paxton became affluent, not so much through his Chatsworth employment, but by successful speculation in the railway industry. He retired from Chatsworth when the Duke died in 1858 but carried on working at various projects such as the Thames Graving Dock. Paxton died at his home at Rockhills, Sydenham, in 1865 and was buried on the Chatsworth Estate in St Peter's Churchyard, Edensor. His wife Sarah remained at their house on the Chatsworth Estate until her death in 1871.

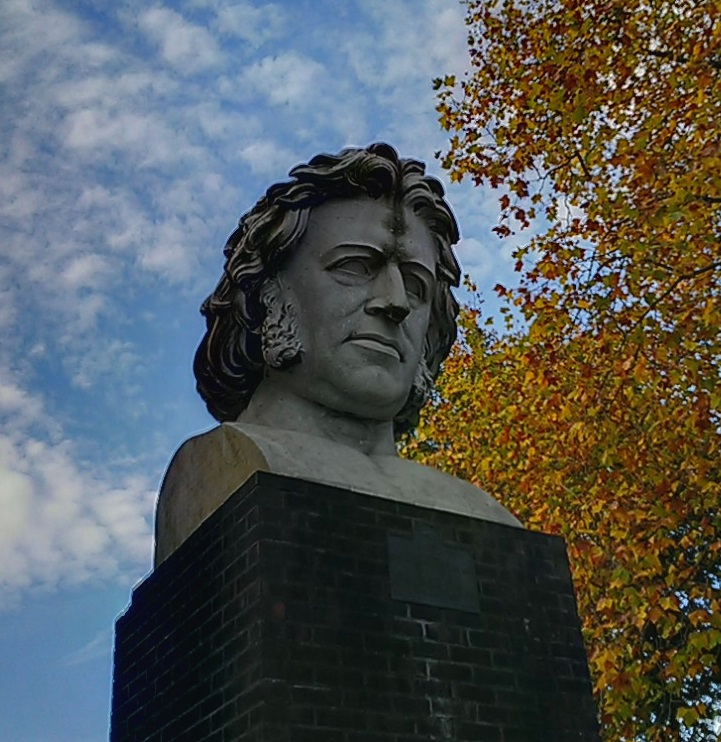
Bust of Paxton in Crystal Palace Park.

== Notes ==
Parliament of the United Kingdom
Preceded by Edward Ellice; Charles Geach	Member of Parliament for Coventry; 1854 – 1865; With: Edward Ellice; Morgan Treherne	Succeeded by Morgan Treherne; Henry Eaton
