= William Cavendish, 6th Duke of Devonshire =

English peer, courtier and politician (1790–1858)

His Grace The Duke of Devonshire KG PC
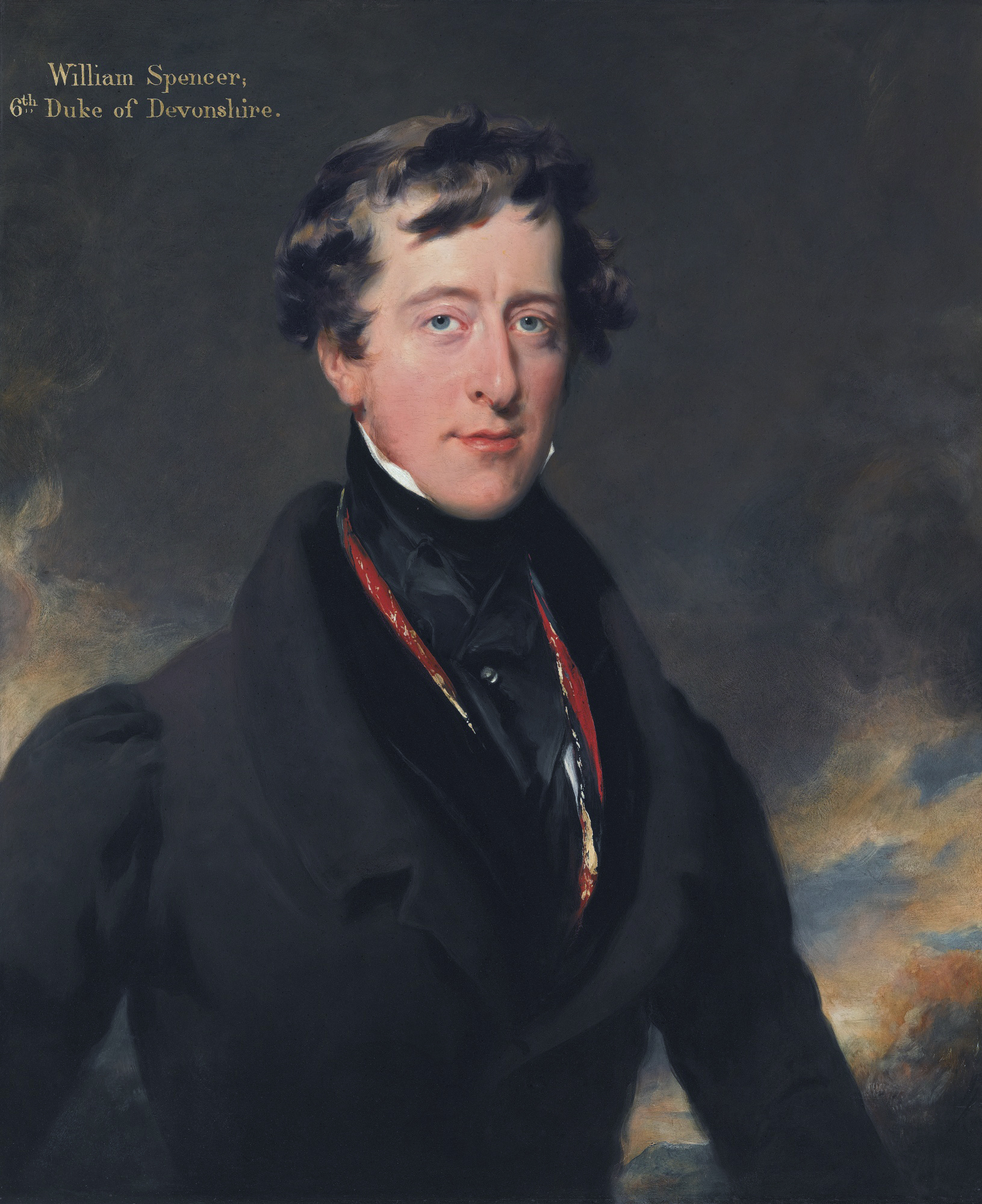
- Portrait of the Duke of Devonshire (c. 1824)

Lord Chamberlain of the Household
- In office 22 November 1830 – 14 November 1834
- Monarch: William IV
- Prime Minister: The Earl Grey; The Viscount Melbourne
- Preceded by: The Earl of Jersey
- Succeeded by: The Earl of Jersey
- In office 5 May 1827 – 21 January 1828
- Monarch: George IV
- Prime Minister: George Canning; The Viscount Goderich
- Preceded by: The Duke of Montrose
- Succeeded by: The Duke of Montrose

Lord Lieutenant of Derbyshire
- In office 27 August 1811 – 18 January 1858
- Monarchs: George III; George IV; William IV; Queen Victoria
- Preceded by: The 5th Duke of Devonshire
- Succeeded by: The 7th Duke of Devonshire

Member of the House of Lords as Duke of Devonshire
- In office 11 July 1811 – 18 January 1858
- Preceded by: The 5th Duke of Devonshire
- Succeeded by: The 7th Duke of Devonshire

Personal details
- Born: 21 May 1790 Paris, France
- Died: 18 January 1858 (aged 67) Hardwick Hall, Derbyshire, England
- Party: Whig
- Parent(s): William Cavendish, 5th Duke of Devonshire; Lady Georgiana Spencer
- Education: Trinity College, Cambridge

William George Spencer Cavendish, 6th Duke of Devonshire (21 May 1790 – 18 January 1858), styled Marquess of Hartington until 1811, was an English peer, courtier and Whig politician. Known as the "Bachelor Duke", he served as Lord Chamberlain from 1827 to 1828 and again from 1830 to 1834. The Cavendish banana is named after him.

== Background ==
Born in Paris, France, Devonshire was the son of William Cavendish, 5th Duke of Devonshire, and Lady Georgiana, daughter of John Spencer, 1st Earl Spencer, members of the Cavendish family. He was educated at Harrow and at Trinity College, Cambridge. He lost both his parents while still in his youth; his mother died in 1806 and his father in 1811 when, aged 21, he succeeded to the dukedom. Along with the title, he inherited eight stately homes and some 200,000 acres (809 km^{2} or 80,900 ha) of land.

== Political career ==
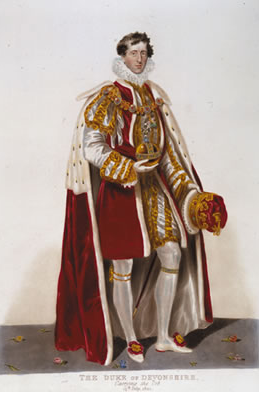
The duke carrying the Orb at the coronation of George IV in 1821.

Politically Devonshire followed in the Whig family tradition. He supported Catholic emancipation, the abolition of slavery and reduced factory working hours. He held office as Lord Chamberlain of the Household under George Canning and Lord Goderich between 1827 and 1828 and under Lord Grey and Lord Melbourne between 1830 and 1834. In 1827 he was sworn of the Privy Council and made a Knight of the Garter. He was appointed Ambassador Extraordinary to the Russian Empire on the coronation of Tsar Nicholas I in 1826.

Devonshire was also Lord Lieutenant of Derbyshire between 1811 and 1858 and carried the globus cruciger at George IV's coronation. However, increasing deafness from an early age prevented him from taking an even greater part in public life.

== Other interests ==
Devonshire had a major interest in gardening and horticulture, and devoted himself sedulously to the care and nurture of his vast estates. His major projects including the wholesale rebuilding of the village of Edensor, and significant improvement to his several stately houses and their gardens. He befriended Sir Joseph Paxton, then employed at the Royal Horticultural Society's Chiswick Gardens, located close to Devonshire's London estate Chiswick House, and appointed him his head gardener at Chatsworth House in 1826, despite Paxton being only in his early twenties at the time. Paxton greatly expanded the gardens at Chatsworth, including the construction of a 277 foot (84 m) conservatory, which served as a model for The Crystal Palace constructed in London's Hyde Park.

Devonshire, himself a keen horticulturalist, was elected President of the Royal Horticultural Society in 1838, a position in which he served for twenty years until his death. It was this interest which led him to establish the Royal Botanic Gardens at Kew as a national botanic garden. The world's most commercially exploited banana, the Cavendish, was named in his honour. He had acquired an early specimen, which he raised in his glasshouse, and this plant is the progenitor of almost all the worldwide varieties of Cavendish banana.

Devonshire was also patron of The Derby Town and County Museum and Natural History Society. In that position, he was instrumental in the creation of the Derby Museum and Art Gallery in 1836.

He also travelled extensively.

In 1845, Cavendish published a book called Handbook to Chatsworth and Hardwick. It was privately printed and provided a history of the Cavendish family's two primary estates: Chatsworth House and Hardwick Hall; the handbook was praised by author Charles Dickens.

== Personal life ==
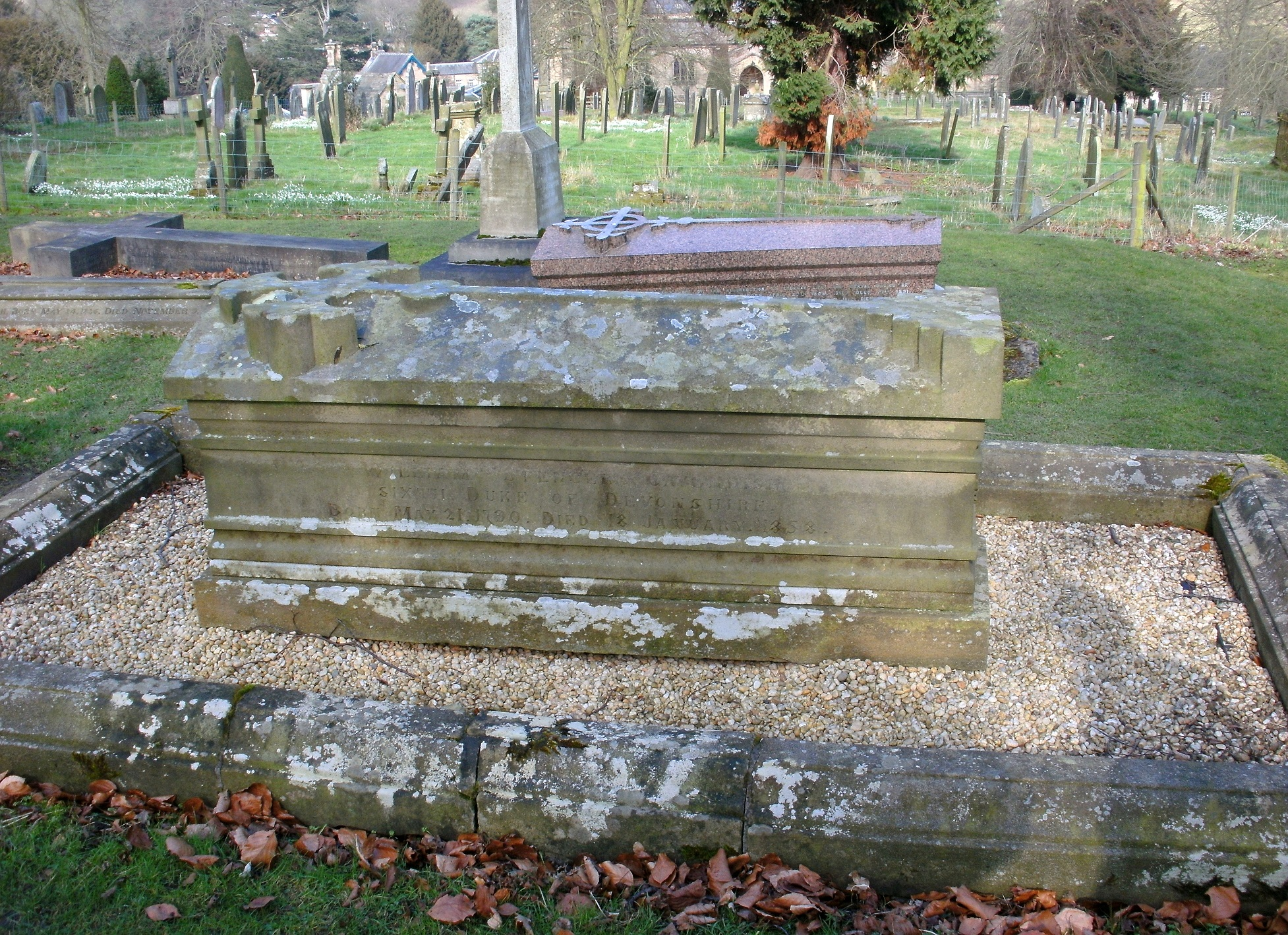
St Peter's Churchyard, Edensor - grave of William Cavendish, 6th Duke of Devonshire KG, PC (1790–1858)

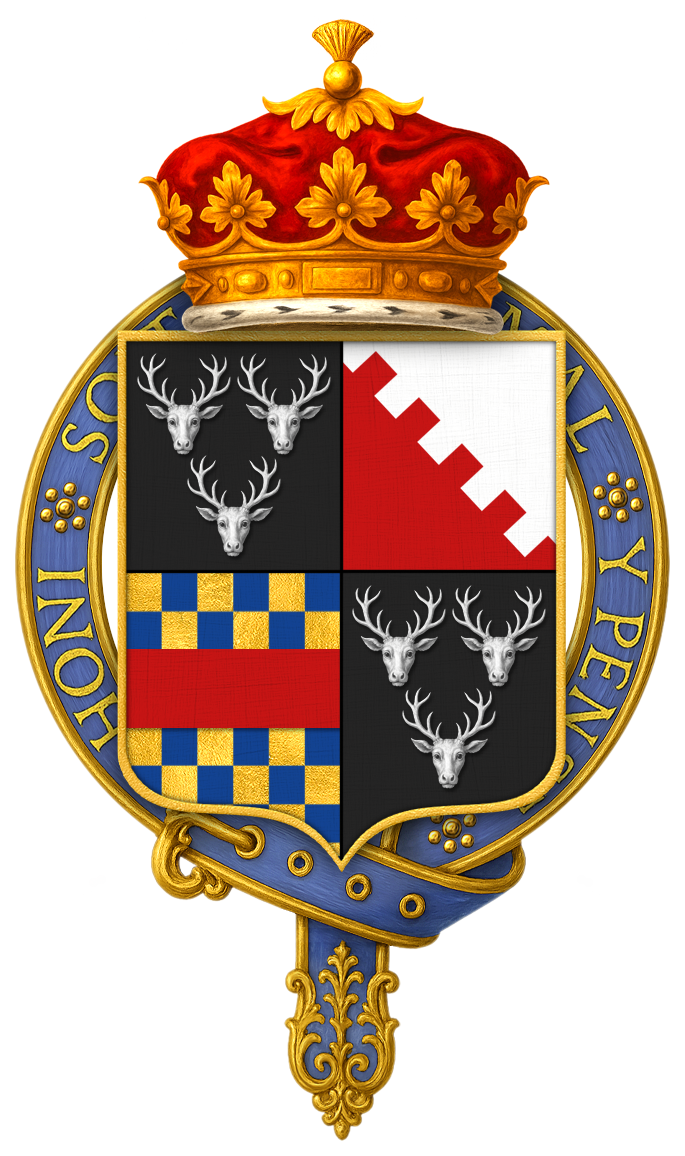
Shield of arms of William Cavendish, 6th Duke of Devonshire, KG, PC

Devonshire was a close friend of the Prince Regent. Other friends included Antonio Canova and Charles Dickens.

Much of Devonshire's private correspondence, including letters to his mistresses (one of whom he installed nearby), was destroyed by his Victorian relatives. He intended to marry Lady Caroline Ponsonby, his cousin, but she married William Lamb, which he found devastating.

Devonshire died at Hardwick Hall, Derbyshire, in January 1858, aged 67, and left an estate valued at £500,000 in his will. As he was unmarried the dukedom passed to his cousin William Cavendish, 2nd Earl of Burlington. His junior title of Baron Clifford fell into abeyance between his sisters, Georgiana, Countess of Carlisle, and Harriet, Countess Granville.

== See also ==
- Column of the Temple of Poseidon at Chatsworth

Political offices
Preceded by The Duke of Montrose	Lord Chamberlain of the Household; 1827–1828	Succeeded by The Duke of Montrose
Preceded by The Earl of Jersey	Lord Chamberlain of the Household; 1830–1834	Succeeded by The Earl of Jersey
Preceded by The Duke of Devonshire	Lord Lieutenant of Derbyshire; 1811–1858	Succeeded by The Duke of Devonshire
Peerage of England
Preceded by William Cavendish	Duke of Devonshire; 1811–1858	Succeeded by William Cavendish
Preceded by William Cavendish	Baron Clifford; 1811–1858	In abeyance
