= List of British films of 1971 =

A list of films produced in the United Kingdom in 1971 (see 1971 in film):

== Feature films ==
Title	Director	Cast	Genre	Notes
1971
10 Rillington Place	Richard Fleischer	Richard Attenborough, John Hurt, Judy Geeson	Crime	
The Abominable Dr. Phibes	Robert Fuest	Vincent Price, Joseph Cotten, Virginia North	Horror comedy	
All the Right Noises	Gerry O'Hara	Tom Bell, Olivia Hussey, Judy Carne	Drama	
Assault	Sidney Hayers	Suzy Kendall, Frank Finlay, Lesley-Anne Down	Thriller	
The Beloved	George P. Cosmatos	Raquel Welch, Richard Johnson, Jack Hawkins	Drama	
Black Beauty	James Hill	Walter Slezak, Mark Lester, Uschi Glas	Drama	
Blood from the Mummy's Tomb	Seth Holt	Valerie Leon, Andrew Keir, James Villiers	Horror	
The Blood on Satan's Claw	Piers Haggard	Patrick Wymark, Linda Hayden, Michele Dotrice	Horror	
Bloomfield	Richard Harris, Uri Zohar	Richard Harris, Romy Schneider, Maurice Kaufmann	Drama	Entered into the 21st Berlin International Film Festival
The Boy Friend	Ken Russell	Twiggy, Christopher Gable, Max Adrian	Musical comedy	
Carry On at Your Convenience	Gerald Thomas	Sid James, Kenneth Williams, Joan Sims	Comedy	
Carry On Henry	Gerald Thomas	Sid James, Kenneth Williams, Joan Sims	Comedy	
Clinic Exclusive	Don Chaffey	Georgina Ward, Alexander Davion, Polly Adams	Comedy	
A Clockwork Orange	Stanley Kubrick	Malcolm McDowell, Patrick Magee, Warren Clarke	Drama	Number 81 in the list of BFI Top 100 British films
Countess Dracula	Peter Sasdy	Ingrid Pitt, Nigel Green, Lesley-Anne Down	Horror	
Creatures the World Forgot	Don Chaffey	Julie Ege, Brian O'Shaughnessy, Tony Bonner	Adventure	
Crucible of Terror	Ted Hooker	Mike Raven, Mary Maude, James Bolam	Horror	
Dad's Army	Norman Cohen	Arthur Lowe, John Le Mesurier, Clive Dunn	Comedy	Spin-off of Dad's Army
The Devils	Ken Russell	Oliver Reed, Vanessa Redgrave, Max Adrian	Drama	
Diamonds Are Forever	Guy Hamilton	Sean Connery, Charles Gray, Jill St. John	Spy	
Die Screaming, Marianne	Pete Walker	Susan George, Barry Evans, Judy Huxtable	Horror thriller	
Dr. Jekyll and Sister Hyde	Roy Ward Baker	Ralph Bates, Martine Beswick, Gerald Sim	Horror	
Dulcima	Frank Nesbitt	Carol White, John Mills, Bernard Lee	Drama	Entered into the 21st Berlin International Film Festival
Eagle in a Cage	Fielder Cook	Kenneth Haigh, Ralph Richardson, Billie Whitelaw	Historical	Co-production with the US
An Elephant Called Slowly	James Hill	Virginia McKenna, Bill Travers, George Adamson	Adventure	
Family Life	Ken Loach	Sandy Ratcliff, Bill Dean, Malcolm Tierney	Drama	
Flight of the Doves	Ralph Nelson	Ron Moody, Jack Wild, Stanley Holloway	Drama	
Freelance	Francis Megahy	Ian McShane, Gayle Hunnicutt, Keith Barron	Thriller	
Friends	Lewis Gilbert	Sean Bury, Anicée Alvina, Ronald Lewis	Romance	
Fright	Peter Collinson	Ian Bannen, Susan George, Honor Blackman	Thriller	
Get Carter	Mike Hodges	Michael Caine, Ian Hendry, Britt Ekland	Crime	Number 16 in the list of BFI Top 100 British films; Remake of this in 2000
Girl Stroke Boy	Bob Kellett	Joan Greenwood, Michael Hordern, Clive Francis	Comedy drama	
The Go-Between	Joseph Losey	Julie Christie, Alan Bates, Margaret Leighton, Edward Fox	Drama	Number 57 in the list of BFI Top 100 British films; Palme d'Or winner
Gumshoe	Stephen Frears	Albert Finney, Billie Whitelaw, Frank Finlay	Mystery	
Hands of the Ripper	Peter Sasdy	Eric Porter, Angharad Rees, Jane Merrow	Horror	
Hannie Caulder	Burt Kennedy	Raquel Welch, Robert Culp, Ernest Borgnine	Western	
I, Monster	Stephen Weeks	Christopher Lee, Peter Cushing, Mike Raven	Horror	
Incense for the Damned	Robert Hartford-Davis	Patrick Macnee, Peter Cushing, Edward Woodward	Horror	
Kidnapped	Delbert Mann	Michael Caine, Trevor Howard, Jack Hawkins	Adventure	
King Lear	Peter Brook	Paul Scofield, Irene Worth, Cyril Cusack	Drama	
The Last Valley	James Clavell	Michael Caine, Omar Sharif, Nigel Davenport	Historical	
Lust for a Vampire	Jimmy Sangster	Ralph Bates, Barbara Jefford, Yutte Stensgaard	Horror	
Macbeth	Roman Polanski	Jon Finch, Francesca Annis, Martin Shaw	Drama	
The Magnificent Seven Deadly Sins	Graham Stark	Harry Secombe, Harry H. Corbett , Leslie Phillips	Comedy	
Mary, Queen of Scots	Charles Jarrott	Vanessa Redgrave, Glenda Jackson, Timothy Dalton	Historical	
Melody	Waris Hussein	Jack Wild, Mark Lester, Tracy Hyde	Romance	
Mr. Forbush and the Penguins	Arne Sucksdorff	John Hurt, Hayley Mills, Dudley Sutton	Comedy drama	
Murphy's War	Peter Yates	Peter O'Toole, Siân Phillips, Philippe Noiret	World War II	
The Music Lovers	Ken Russell	Richard Chamberlain, Glenda Jackson, Max Adrian	Historical	
Nicholas and Alexandra	Franklin J. Schaffner	Michael Jayston, Janet Suzman, Laurence Olivier	Historical	
The Night Digger	Alastair Reid	Patricia Neal, Pamela Brown, Nicholas Clay	Horror	
The Nightcomers	Michael Winner	Marlon Brando, Stephanie Beacham, Harry Andrews	Horror	
On the Buses	Harry Booth	Reg Varney, Bob Grant, Stephen Lewis	Comedy	TV spin-off
Percy	Ralph Thomas	Hywel Bennett, Denholm Elliott, Elke Sommer	Comedy	
Please Sir!	Mark Stuart	John Alderton, Deryck Guyler, Joan Sanderson	Comedy	TV spin-off
Private Road	Barney Platts-Mills	Susan Penhaligon, Bruce Robinson, Michael Feast	Drama	
Quest for Love	Ralph Thomas	Joan Collins, Tom Bell, Denholm Elliott	Sci-fi drama	
The Raging Moon	Bryan Forbes	Malcolm McDowell, Nanette Newman, Georgia Brown	Romance	
Revenge	Sidney Hayers	Joan Collins, James Booth, Sinéad Cusack	Thriller	
Secrets	Philip Saville	Jacqueline Bisset, Robert Powell, Per Oscarsson	Drama	
See No Evil	Richard Fleischer	Mia Farrow, Dorothy Alison, Robin Bailey	Thriller	
She'll Follow You Anywhere	David C. Rea	Kenneth Cope, Keith Barron, Hilary Pritchard	Sex comedy	
The Statue	Rod Amateau	David Niven, Virna Lisi, Robert Vaughn	Comedy	
Straw Dogs	Sam Peckinpah	Dustin Hoffman, Susan George, Peter Vaughan	Thriller	
Suburban Wives	Derek Ford	Claire Gordon, Gabrielle Drake, Richard Thorp	Sex comedy	
Sunday Bloody Sunday	John Schlesinger	Peter Finch, Glenda Jackson, Murray Head	Drama	Number 65 in the list of BFI Top 100 British films
To Catch a Spy	Dick Clement	Kirk Douglas, Marlène Jobert, Trevor Howard	Spy comedy	
A Town Called Hell	Robert Parrish	Telly Savalas, Robert Shaw, Stella Stevens	Western	Co-production with Spain
The Trojan Women	Michael Cacoyannis	Katharine Hepburn, Vanessa Redgrave, Geneviève Bujold	Historical drama	Co-production with Greece
Universal Soldier	Cy Endfield	George Lazenby, Ben Carruthers, Rudolph Walker	Action	
Unman, Wittering and Zigo	John Mackenzie	David Hemmings, Douglas Wilmer, Carolyn Seymour	Thriller	
Up Pompeii	Bob Kellett	Frankie Howerd, Michael Hordern, Barbara Murray	Comedy	Based on the TV series
Up the Chastity Belt	Bob Kellett	Frankie Howerd, Graham Crowden, Bill Fraser	Comedy	
Villain	Michael Tuchner	Richard Burton, Ian McShane, T. P. McKenna	Crime	
Virgin Witch	Ray Austin	Ann Michelle, Vicki Michelle, Neil Hallett	Horror	
Walkabout	Nicolas Roeg	Jenny Agutter, David Gulpilil, John Meillon	Drama	
When Eight Bells Toll	Étienne Périer	Anthony Hopkins, Jack Hawkins, Nathalie Delon	Spy action	
Whoever Slew Auntie Roo?	Curtis Harrington	Shelley Winters, Mark Lester, Ralph Richardson	Horror	
The Yes Girls	Lindsay Shonteff	Sue Bond, Jack Smethurst, Jack May	Sex comedy	
Zeppelin	Étienne Périer	Michael York, Elke Sommer, Peter Carsten	World War I	

=== Compilations, documentaries and short films ===
Title	Director	Cast	Genre	Notes
And Now for Something Completely Different	Ian MacNaughton	Graham Chapman, John Cleese, Michael Palin	Comedy	Remakes of sketches from Monty Python's Flying Circus (series 1 and 2)
Bread	Stanley Long	Anthony Nigel, Peter Marinker	Musical	
Bronco Bullfrog	Barney Platts-Mills	Del Walker, Anne Gooding	Drama	
The Chairman's Wife	Gerry O'Hara	David de Keyser, Fiona Lewis, John Osborne	Drama	Short film
The Tales of Beatrix Potter	Reginald Mills	Royal Ballet dancers	Dance	

== Most Popular Films of the Year at British Box Office ==
Source: Motion Picture Herald

=== General Release ===
1. The Aristocats
2. On the Buses*
3. Soldier Blue
4. Carry On Loving*
5. Dad's Army*
6. Get Carter*
7. There's a Girl in My Soup*
8. Percy*
9. The Railway Children*
10. Up Pompeii*
11. When Eight Bells Toll*

(* British film)

=== Reserved Ticket Attraction ===
1. Song of Norway
2. Love Story
3. Ryan's Daughter
4. Paint Your Wagon
5. Waterloo

According to another account the list was:

1. The Aristocats
2. On the Buses
3. Soldier Blue
4. There's a Girl in My Soup
5. Percy
6. The Railway Children
7. Too Late the Hero
8. Tales of Beatrix Potter
9. Up Pompeii
10. The Last Valley
11. Butch Cassidy and the Sundance Kid
12. When Eight Bells Toll
13. Tora! Tora! Tora!
14. Dad's Army
15. Little Big Man

== Most Popular Stars ==
Source: Motion Picture Herald

1. Richard Burton
2. Steve McQueen
3. Dustin Hoffman
4. Michael Caine
5. Oliver Reed
6. Glenda Jackson
7. Candice Bergen
8. Clint Eastwood
9. Frankie Howerd
10. Jack Nicholson

== See also ==
- 1971 in British music
- 1971 in British radio
- 1971 in British television
- 1971 in the United Kingdom
