= 1971 in British television =

This is a list of British television related events from 1971.

== Events ==
=== January ===
- 1 January – BBC1 first airs the children's sitcom Here Come the Double Deckers!.
- 3 January – BBC Open University broadcasts begin on BBC2.
- 21 January
  - The third Emley Moor transmitting station in Yorkshire begins broadcasting. A tapered, reinforced concrete tower, it is the tallest freestanding structure in the United Kingdom at a height of 1,084 feet (330 m).
  - BBC2 debuts the comedy show Dave Allen at Large.
- 27 January – The character Valerie Barlow (played by Anne Reid) is electrocuted by a faulty hairdryer and then perishes in a house fire on Coronation Street.

=== February ===
- 2 February – After nearly three months, the ITV Colour Strike ends and programmes resume being made in colour on 8 February.
- 6 February–13 March – BBC2 first broadcasts the serial Jude the Obscure, starring Robert Powell, in six 45-minute episodes.
- 17 February – BBC2 airs Elizabeth R, a drama serial of six 85-minute plays starring Glenda Jackson in the title role of Queen Elizabeth I of England.
- 25 February – The animated children's adventure series Mr Benn airs on BBC1 with the copyright year shown from the previous year (1970) in the end credits shortly before the BBC tv logo. However the other regular BBC programmes unlike The Trumptonshire Trilogy still won't show any copyright years until the following year (1972).

=== March ===
- 5 March – The third in Peter Cook's live late night chat show series Where Do I Sit? is shown on BBC2 after which the BBC pulls the 9 remaining scheduled episodes on quality grounds.
- 24 March – The Benny Hill Show on ITV reaches an audience of over 21 million with the episode "Cinema: The Vintage Years".
- 29 March – ITV shows the television premiere of Ray Harryhausen's 1963 fantasy action film Jason and the Argonauts.
- 29 March – The American children's educational series Sesame Street begins airing on British television for the first time, debuting on ITV by first airing on HTV.

=== April ===
- 3 April – Terry Wogan makes his debut as commentator on BBC1's coverage of the Eurovision Song Contest, broadcast live from Dublin. He would remain the regular voice of Eurovision until 2008.
- 4 April – The final episode of Catweazle airs on ITV.
- 10 April – Sketch comedy show The Two Ronnies makes its debut on BBC1. Starring Ronnie Barker and Ronnie Corbett, it will go on to become one of the most successful and long-running light entertainment shows on British television, running until 1987.
- 17 April – ITV shows the animated Charlie Brown special It's the Great Pumpkin, Charlie Brown.

=== May ===
- 14 May – ITV Midlands shows the original 1931 Frankenstein film for the first time, starring Boris Karloff
- 22 May – Westward Television starts broadcasting in colour from the Redruth transmitting station.
- 25 May – The 1,500 episode of Crossroads airs in ITV.
- 29 May – ITV Midlands shows the 1933 classic monster film King Kong for the first time.

=== June ===
- 7 June – The UK children's magazine show Blue Peter buries a time capsule in the grounds of BBC Television Centre, due to be opened on the first episode of the year 2000.
- 17 June – BBC1 airs the documentary Yesterday's Men as part of the 24 Hours strand, a film about former Prime Minister Harold Wilson and the Labour Party Cabinet following Labour's loss of power at the 1970 general election. The BBC removes parts of the programme amid complaints from Labour about allegations surrounding Wilson's memoirs, prompting producer Angela Pope to have her name removed from the documentary. The BBC ultimately agrees not to repeat the film during Wilson's lifetime and it is not shown again until 2013.
- 19 June – The first episode of the late night chat show Parkinson with host Michael Parkinson is broadcast on BBC1.

=== August ===
- 2 August – The Pendle Forest transmitter begins transmissions and becomes the first UHF relay service to be operated by the Independent Television Authority.
- 7 August – ITV cameras cover the Football Association Charity Shield for the first time, with highlights shown the following day. Second Division champions Leicester City, standing in for Double winners Arsenal, beat Liverpool 1–0.

=== September ===
- 1 September – Border Television marks its tenth anniversary and begins broadcasting in colour, but initially only from the Caldbeck transmitting station, while viewers served by the Selkirk transmitter have to wait until the following year for colour television broadcasts to begin.
- 4 September – BBC1 debuts The Wonderful World of Disney. Initially broadcast as 'Walt Disney's Wonderful World of Color', the anthology series features original Disney short films as well as appearances from numerous Disney characters.
- 13 September – Westward begins broadcasting in colour from the Stockland Hill and Caradon Hill transmitters and to mark the change, Westward's Golden Hind ship ident is reshot in colour.
- 17 September – ITV debuts the action-comedy series The Persuaders! starring Roger Moore and Tony Curtis.
- 21 September – Album music show The Old Grey Whistle Test premieres on BBC2.
- 25 September – Sesame Street starts airing on LWT and Grampian Television.
- 30 September – Grampian Television marks its tenth anniversary and begins broadcasting in colour from the Durris transmitter.

=== October ===
- 2 October – Debut of The Generation Game on BBC1, presented by Bruce Forsyth.
- 9 October – ITV airs the UK version of the American game show Sale of the Century.
- 10 October – Upstairs, Downstairs debuts on ITV.

=== November ===
- 10 November – The BBC's new Pebble Mill Studios in Birmingham are opened by Princess Anne.
- 20 November – The children's programme Play Away debuts on BBC2, hosted by Brian Cant.
- 27 November – BBC2 screens the network premiere of the 1960 Roger Corman horror film Fall of The House of Usher, starring Vincent Price and based on the story by Edgar Allan Poe.

=== December ===
- 24 December – BBC1 airs M. R. James' The Stalls of Barchester, the first of several made-for-television short films, shown annually until 1978, known collectively as A Ghost Story for Christmas.
- 26 December – BBC2 airs its first terrestrial television showing of Victor Fleming's 1948 American epic film version of Joan of Arc, starring Ingrid Bergman, José Ferrer, Leif Erickson, John Ireland and Ward Bond.
- 28 December – The terrestrial television premiere of the classic 1963 World War II film The Great Escape on BBC1, starring Steve McQueen, James Garner, Charles Bronson, Richard Attenborough and James Coburn.

== Debuts ==
=== BBC1 ===
- 1 January – Here Come the Double Deckers! (1971)
- 17 January – The Last of the Mohicans (1971)
- 21 January – Dave Allen at Large (1971–1979)
- 22 January – That's Your Funeral (1971)
- 13 February – The Mary Tyler Moore Show (1970–1977)
- 22 February – Joe and the Gladiator (1971)
- 25 February – Mr Benn (1971, 2005)
- 26 February – Sykes and a Big Big Show (1971)
- 15 March – Island of the Great Yellow Ox (1971)
- 1 April – Now Take My Wife (1971)
- 10 April – The Two Ronnies (1971–1987, 1991, 1996, 2005)
- 15 April – It's Awfully Bad for Your Eyes, Darling (1971)
- 19 April
  - Alias Smith and Jones (1971–1973)
  - Brett (1971)
- 14 May – Look, Mike Yarwood! (1971–1976)
- 18 June – Ryan and Ronnie (1971–1973)
- 19 June – Parkinson (1971–1982, 1998–2007)
- 22 August – The Silver Sword (1971)
- 4 September – The Wonderful World of Disney (1969–1979)
- 15 September
  - Barlow at Large (1971–1975)
  - Owen, M.D. (1971–1973)
- 17 September – The Partridge Family (1970–1974)
- 20 September – A Taste of Honey (1971)
- 2 October – The Generation Game (1971–1982, 1990–2002)
- 4 October – The Witch's Daughter (1971)
- 15 October – The Onedin Line (1971–1980)
- 21 October – Edna, the Inebriate Woman (1971)
- 23 October – Francis Durbridge Presents: The Passenger (1971)
- 5 November – Now Look Here (1971–1973)
- 8 November – The Runaway Summer (1971)
- 14 November – Tom Brown's Schooldays (1971)
- 24 December – A Ghost Story for Christmas (1971–1978)
- 28 December – The Snow Goose (1971)

=== BBC2 ===
- 9 January – Sense and Sensibility (1971)
- 22 January – Some Matters of Little Consequence (1971)
- 27 January – Long Voyage Out of War (1971)
- 6 February – Jude the Obscure (1971)
- 17 February – Elizabeth R (1971)
- 19 February – Where Do I Sit? (1971)
- 26 March – Sunset Song (1971)
- 8 May – Bel Ami (1971)
- 11 June – Birds on the Wing (1971)
- 7 July – Stage 2 (1971–1972)
- 7 August – Cousin Bette (1971)
- 26 August – Trial (1971)
- 12 September – Eyeless in Gaza (1971)
- 21 September
  - The Old Grey Whistle Test (1971–1987)
  - Look and Read: The Boy from Space (1971)
- 22 September – The Search for the Nile (1971)
- 14 November – Wives and Daughters (1971)
- 16 November – Casanova (1971)
- 20 November – Play Away (1971–1984)
- 25 November – The View from Daniel Pike (1971–1973)
- 25 December – Cider with Rosie (1971)

=== ITV ===
- 8 January – Six Dates with Barker (1971)
- 14 January – A Class by Himself (1971–1972)
- 30 January – The More We Are Together (1971)
- 2 February – Bless This House (1971–1976)
- 19 February – Coppers End (1971)
- 20 February – The Leslie Crowther Show (1971)
- 28 February – Doctor at Large (1971)
- 4 March – Slapstick and Old Lace (1971)
- 29 March – Sesame Street (1969–present)
- 30 March – The Ten Commandments (1971)
- 7 April – Hine (1971)
- 9 April – Budgie (1971–1972)
- 18 April – Persuasion (1971)
- 27 April – ...And Mother Makes Three (1971–1973)
- 10 May – The Last of the Baskets (1971–1972)
- 21 May – Kindly Leave the Kerb (1971)
- 6 June – Jamie (1971)
- 12 June – The Comedians (1971–1985)
- 14 June – Seasons of the Year (1971)
- 28 June – Follyfoot (1971–1973)
- 2 July – The Trouble with Lilian (1971)
- 5 July – You're Only Young Twice (1971)
- 10 July – The Guardians (1971)
- 11 July – The Odd Couple (1970–1975)
- 15 July – Alexander the Greatest (1971–1972)
- 4 August – The Edward Woodward Hour (1971–1972)
- 8 August – Justice (1971–1974)
- 1 September – Frankie Howerd's Hour (1971)
- 15 September – Jason King (1971–1972)
- 17 September – The Persuaders! (1971–1972)
- 17 September – The Fenn Street Gang (1971–1973)
- 20 September – The Rivals of Sherlock Holmes (1971–1973)
- 21 September – Keep It in the Family (1971)
- 1 October – The Marty Feldman Comedy Machine (1971)
- 9 October – Sale of the Century (1971–1983)
- 10 October – Upstairs, Downstairs (1971–1975, 2010–2012)
- 20 October – Tottering Towers (1971–1972)
- 25 October – Lollipop Loves Mr Mole (1971–1972)
- 23 November – Suspicion (1971–1972)
- 14 December – Mike and Bernie (1971–1972)
- Unknown – Grasshopper Island (1971)

== Television shows ==
=== Returning this year after a break of one year or longer ===
- Whack-O! (1956–1960; 1971–1972)

== Continuing television shows ==
=== 1920s ===
- BBC Wimbledon (1927–1939, 1946–2019, 2021–2024)

=== 1930s ===
- Trooping the Colour (1937–1939, 1946–2019, 2023–present)
- The Boat Race (1938–1939, 1946–2019, 2021–present)
- BBC Cricket (1939, 1946–1999, 2020–2024)

=== 1950s ===
- Come Dancing (1950–1998)
- Watch with Mother (1952–1975)
- The Good Old Days (1953–1983)
- Panorama (1953–present)
- Dixon of Dock Green (1955–1976)
- Opportunity Knocks (1956–1978, 1987–1990)
- This Week (1956–1978, 1986–1992)
- Armchair Theatre (1956–1974)
- What the Papers Say (1956–2008)
- The Sky at Night (1957–present)
- Blue Peter (1958–present)
- Grandstand (1958–2007)
- The Black and White Minstrel Show (1958–1978)

=== 1960s ===
- Coronation Street (1960–present)
- Songs of Praise (1961–present)
- Steptoe and Son (1962–1965, 1970–1974)
- Z-Cars (1962–1978)
- Animal Magic (1962–1983)
- Doctor Who (1963–1989, 1996, 2005–present)
- World in Action (1963–1998)
- Top of the Pops (1964–2006)
- Match of the Day (1964–present)
- Crossroads (1964–1988, 2001–2003)
- Play School (1964–1988)
- Mr. and Mrs. (1965–1999)
- Call My Bluff (1965–2005)
- World of Sport (1965–1985)
- Jackanory (1965–1996, 2006)
- Sportsnight (1965–1997)
- It's a Knockout (1966–1982, 1999–2001)
- The Money Programme (1966–2010)
- Callan (1967–1972)
- The Golden Shot (1967–1975)
- ITV Playhouse (1967–1982)
- Reksio (1967–1990)
- Please Sir! (1968–1972)
- Father, Dear Father (1968–1973)
- Dad's Army (1968–1977)
- Magpie (1968–1980)
- The Big Match (1968–2002)
- On the Buses (1969–1973)
- Clangers (1969–1974, 2015–present)
- Monty Python's Flying Circus (1969–1974)
- Hadleigh (1969–1976)
- Nationwide (1969–1983)
- Screen Test (1969–1984)

=== 1970s ===
- A Family at War (1970–1972)
- Queenie's Castle (1970–1972)
- The Goodies (1970–1982)

== Ending this year ==
- All Gas and Gaiters (1966–1971)
- Never Mind the Quality, Feel the Width (1967–1971)
- Me Mammy (1968–1971)
- The Mind of Mr. J.G. Reeder (1969–1971)
- Albert and Victoria (1970–1971)
- Bachelor Father (1970–1971)
- The Lovers (1970–1971)
- Timeslip (1970–1971)
- UFO (1970–1971)
- Catweazle (1970–71)

== Births ==
- 1 January – Suzanne Virdee, British regional newscaster (Midlands Today)
- 3 January – Sarah Alexander, actress
- 5 January
  - Joanna Gosling, journalist and newsreader
  - Jayne Middlemiss, British television presenter
- 12 January – Jay Burridge, British artist and television presenter
- 13 January – Sarah Tansey, British actress (Heartbeat)
- 15 January – Lara Cazalet, British actress
- 20 January
  - Gary Barlow, singer and actor
  - Pixie McKenna, Irish presenter (Embarrassing Bodies)
- 29 January – Clare Balding, sports presenter, journalist and jockey
- 30 January – Darren Boyd, actor
- 31 January – Patrick Kielty, Northern Irish comedian and television presenter
- 2 February – Michelle Gayle, singer and actress
- 13 February – Sonia, English pop singer
- 16 February
  - Amanda Holden, British actress and television presenter
  - Steven Houghton, British actor and singer
- 17 February – Jeremy Edwards, actor
- 20 February – Sarah Hadland, actress
- 23 February – Melinda Messenger, British television presenter and model
- 2 March – Dave Gorman, comedian and broadcaster
- 3 March – Charlie Brooker, presenter and satirist
- 9 March – Stephanie Chambers, actress
- 23 March – Gail Porter, British television presenter.
- 5 April – Victoria Hamilton, actress
- 15 April
  - Kate Harbour, voice actress
  - Katy Hill, TV presenter
- 16 April – Max Beesley, actor and musician
- 17 April – Claire Sweeney, actress, singer and television personality
- 18 April – David Tennant, Scottish actor
- 27 May – Paul Bettany, British actor
- 5 June – Susan Lynch, Northern Irish actress
- 18 June – Lucy Owen, née Cohen, Welsh news presenter
- 26 June – Emma Noble, actress and model
- 5 July – Nicola Stephenson, actress
- 24 July – John Partridge, actor
- 25 July – Chloë Annett, actress
- 20 August – Helen Grace, actress
- 31 August – Kirstie Allsopp, British television presenter
- 1 September – Debbie Chazen, actress
- 7 September – Lisa Rogers, television presenter
- 8 September – Martin Freeman, actor
- 25 September – Jessie Wallace, British actress
- 29 September – Mackenzie Crook, English actor
- 4 October – Simone Hyams, actress
- 13 October – Sacha Baron Cohen, British comedian
- 16 October – Craig Phillips, British reality show star, winner of Big Brother UK in 2000
- 24 October – Dervla Kirwan, actress
- 1 December – Emily Mortimer, British actress
- Unknown
  - Helen Blakeman, playwright and screenwriter
  - Sophie Stanton, actress

== See also ==
- 1971 in British music
- 1971 in British radio
- 1971 in the United Kingdom
- List of British films of 1971
