= 1971 in the United Kingdom =

Events from the year 1971 in the United Kingdom. The year was marked by the introduction of decimal currency.

== Incumbents ==
- Monarch – Elizabeth II
- Prime Minister – Edward Heath (Conservative)

== Events ==
=== January ===
- 1 January – The Divorce Reform Act 1969 came into effect in England and Wales, allowing couples to divorce after a separation of two years (five if only one of them agrees). A divorce can also be granted on the grounds that the marriage has irretrievably broken down, and it is not essential for either partner to prove "fault". It was revealed on 19 January 1972 that the number of divorces in the United Kingdom during 1971 exceeded 100,000 for the first time.
- 2 January – Ibrox disaster: a stairway crush at the Rangers vs. Celtic football match at Ibrox Stadium in Glasgow killed 66 and left many more injured.
- 3 January – BBC Open University broadcasts began.
- 8 January – Tupamaros kidnapped Geoffrey Jackson, British ambassador to Uruguay, in Montevideo; they kept him captive until September.
- 12 January – The Hertfordshire house of Robert Carr, Secretary of State for Employment, was bombed. Nobody was injured. On 14 January, "The Angry Brigade", an extremist group, admitted responsibility for this bombing, as well as planting a bomb at the Department of Employment offices at Westminster.
- 20 January – The first ever postal workers' strike took place, led by UPW General Secretary Tom Jackson, in an attempt to win a 19.5% pay rise.
- 21 January – After collapsing in March 1969, a newly reconstructed Emley Moor transmitter in West Yorkshire started transmitting again. Now a concrete tower, at 1084 feet (330.4m), it is the United Kingdom's tallest freestanding structure.
- 23 January – The first Commonwealth Heads of Government Meeting, in Singapore, gave the United Kingdom permission to sell weapons to South Africa.

=== February ===
- 1 February – The Broadcast receiver licence was abolished for radios and stamp duty abolished on cheques, receipts and promissory notes.
- 3 February – Tyneside-set British crime film Get Carter starring Michael Caine premièred (in Los Angeles).
- 4 February – Rolls-Royce went bankrupt and was nationalised.
- 11 February – The UK – along with the USA, the USSR and others – signed the Seabed Treaty, outlawing nuclear weapons on the ocean floor.
- 15 February
  - Decimalisation: Decimal Day: the UK and the Republic of Ireland both switched to decimal currency.
  - Enoch Powell predicted an "explosion" unless there was a massive repatriation scheme for the immigrants.
- 24 February – Home Secretary Reginald Maudling announced the Immigration Bill that was set to strip Commonwealth immigrants of their right to remain in the United Kingdom. The bill was supported by Enoch Powell, but the former shadow cabinet minister continued to demand a massive voluntary repatriation scheme for the immigrants.

=== March ===
- 1 March
  - An estimated 120,000 to 250,000 "kill the bill" protesters went on strike against the 1971 Industrial Relations Act in London.
  - The Vehicle & General insurance company collapsed leaving 500,000 motorists uninsured.
- 7 March – Following the recent protests in London, some 10,000 striking workers protested in Glasgow against the Industrial Relations Bill.
- 8 March – The national postal workers' strike ended after 47 days. Among alternatives privately offered during the strike was the Vectis postal service.

=== April ===
- 1 April – The United Kingdom lifted all restrictions on gold ownership with the Exchange Control (Gold Coins Exemption) Order 1971. Since 1966 British citizens had been banned from holding more than four gold coins or from buying any new ones unless they held a licence.
- 11 April – Ten British Army soldiers were injured in rioting in Derry, Northern Ireland.
- 15 April – The planned Barbican Centre in London was given the go-ahead.
- 18 April – There was a serious fire at Kentish Town West railway station. The station remained closed until 5 October 1981.
- 19 April – Unemployment reached a post-Second World War high of nearly 815,000.
- 27 April
  - Eight members of the Welsh Language Society went on trial for destroying English language road signs in Wales.
  - British Leyland launched the Morris Marina which succeeded the Minor (a smaller model, production of which ceased after 23 years with 1.6 million sold) and Oxford models and was similar in size to the Ford Cortina (to which it had been designed as a direct competitor), Vauxhall Victor and Hillman Hunter. It had 1.3 and 1.8 litre petrol engines, rear-wheel drive and a choice of four-door family saloon and two-door coupé body styles, with a five-door estate set to follow in the next two years.

=== May ===
- 1 May
  - A bomb planted by the Angry Brigade exploded in the Biba Kensington store.
  - The Daily Mail appeared as a broadsheet newspaper for the last time, being relaunched the following day as a tabloid.
- 8 May – Arsenal won the FA Cup final with a 2–1 win over Liverpool at Wembley Stadium. Eddie Kelly became the first substitute to score in an FA Cup final, and it was only the second time this century (and the fourth time ever) that an English team has completed the double of the Football League First Division and the FA Cup.
- 11 May – The Daily Sketch, the United Kingdom's oldest tabloid newspaper, was withdrawn from circulation after 62 years and absorbed by the Daily Mail.
- 20 May – Chelsea F.C., last year's FA Cup winners, won the European Cup Winners' Cup with a 2–1 win over Real Madrid of Spain in Athens, Greece.
- 23 May – Jackie Stewart won the Monaco Grand Prix.

=== June ===
- 7 June – The children's show Blue Peter buried a time capsule in the grounds of BBC Television Centre, due to be opened on the first episode of the year 2000.
- 14 June
  - The first Hard Rock Cafe opened near Hyde Park Corner in London.
  - Education Secretary Margaret Thatcher's proposals to end free school milk for children aged over seven years were backed by a majority of 33 MPs.
- 15 June
  - Several Labour run councils threatened to increase rates in order to continue the free supply of milk to school children aged over seven years, in reaction to Thatcher's plans to end free milk supply to school children of that age group. Thatcher defended her plans, saying that the change would free more money to be spent on the construction of new school buildings.
  - Upper Clyde Shipbuilders entered liquidation.
- 20 June – The United Kingdom announced that Soviet space scientist Anatoli Fedoseyev had been granted asylum.
- 21 June – The United Kingdom began new negotiations for EEC membership in Luxembourg.
- 24 June – The EEC agreed terms for the United Kingdom's proposed membership and it was hoped that the nation will join the EEC next year.
- 25–27 June – The first Reading Festival "of jazz and progressive music" took place.

=== July ===
- 1 July – The film Sunday Bloody Sunday was released, one of the first mainstream British films with a bisexual theme.
- 6 July – Police launched a murder investigation after three French tourists were found shot dead in Cheshire.
- 8 July – Two rioters were shot dead by British troops in Derry, Northern Ireland.
- 13 July – Barlaston man Michael Bassett, 24, was found dead in his fume-filled car. Police identified him as their prime suspect in the recent triple French tourist murder in Cheshire.
- 14 July – The Criminal Damage Act abolished the – theoretically capital – offence of arson in royal dockyards.
- 22 July – A BOAC flight from London to Khartoum is ordered to land at Benghazi (Libya) where two leaders of the unsuccessful 1971 Sudanese coup d'état, travelling as passengers, are forced to leave the plane and subsequently executed.
- 23 July – The final section of London Underground's Victoria line, from Victoria to Brixton, was opened by Princess Alexandra. Pimlico tube station, however, was not ready in time and remained closed.
- 29 July – The United Kingdom opted out of the Space Race, with the cancellation of development on its Black Arrow launch vehicle.
- 30 July – Upper Clyde Shipbuilders workers began to take control of the shipyards in a work-in under the leadership of Jimmy Reid.

=== August ===
- 6 August – Chay Blyth became the first person to sail around the world east to west against the prevailing winds.
- 9 August – British security forces in Northern Ireland detained hundreds of guerrilla suspects and put them into Long Kesh prison – the beginning of an internment without trial policy. Twenty died in the riots that followed, including 11 in the Ballymurphy Massacre.
- 11 August – Prime Minister Edward Heath participated in the British victory in the Admiral's Cup yacht race.
- 14 August – The Who released their critically acclaimed album Who's Next.
- 15 August – Showjumper Harvey Smith was stripped of his victory in the British Show Jumping Derby by judges for making a V sign.

=== September ===
- 1 September – The pre-decimal penny and threepence ceased to be legal tender.
- 3 September – Qatar gained independence from the United Kingdom. Unlike most nearby emirates, it declined to become part of either the United Arab Emirates or Saudi Arabia.
- 7 September – The death toll in the Troubles of Northern Ireland reached 100 after three years with the death of 14-year-old Annette McGavigan, who was fatally wounded by a gunshot in crossfire between British soldiers and the IRA.
- 9 September – British ambassador Geoffrey Jackson was freed after being held captive for eight months by extreme left-wing guerrillas in Uruguay.
- 21 September – Television music show The Old Grey Whistle Test was aired for the first time on BBC 2.
- 24 September – Operation FOOT: the United Kingdom expelled 90 Soviet Union intelligence officers operating under diplomatic cover for spying, partly prompted by revelations made by KGB defector Oleg Lyalin earlier in the year; a further 15 staff on leave in the USSR were not allowed to return to the UK.

=== October ===
- 1 October – Godfrey Hounsfield's invention, the CAT scan, was used for the first time on a hospital patient, in Wimbledon.
- 13 October – The British Army began destroying roads between the Republic of Ireland and Northern Ireland as a security measure.
- 21 October
  - A gas explosion in the town centre of Clarkston, East Renfrewshire, killed 20 people.
  - The television drama Edna, the Inebriate Woman was shown on BBC One.
- 23 October – Two women were shot dead by soldiers in Belfast as their car failed to stop at a checkpoint.
- 28 October:
  - The House of Commons voted in favour of joining the EEC by a vote of 356-244.
  - Immigration Act 1971 restricted immigration, particularly primary immigration into the U.K., and introduced the status of right of abode into U.K. law.
  - The United Kingdom became the sixth nation successfully to launch a satellite into orbit using its own launch vehicle, the Prospero (X-3) experimental communications satellite (built at the Royal Aircraft Establishment, Farnborough), using a Black Arrow carrier rocket from Woomera Launch Area 5 in South Australia.
- 30 October – The Democratic Unionist Party was founded by the Rev. Ian Paisley in Northern Ireland.
- 31 October – A bomb, probably planted by the Angry Brigade, exploded at the top of the Post Office Tower in London.

=== November ===
- Erin Pizzey established the world's first domestic violence shelter in Chiswick, London.
- 9 November - An RAF Hercules crashed in Italy, killing 52
- 10 November – The 10-route Spaghetti Junction motorway interchange was opened north of Birmingham city centre, incorporating the A38(M) (Aston Expressway) and the southern section of the M6 motorway. The interchange would have a total of 12 routes when the final stretch of the M6 was opened the following year.
- 22 November – Cairngorm Plateau disaster: Five children and one adult on an expedition die of exposure in the Scottish Highlands.

=== December ===
- 2 December – The Queen's yearly allowance was increased from £475,000 to £980,000.
- 4 December – McGurk's Bar bombing: Fifteen people were killed and 17 injured in a bomb attack that destroyed a bar in Belfast, the highest death toll from a single incident in the city during "The Troubles". The Ulster Volunteer Force is believed to have been behind the bombing.
- 10 December – Dennis Gabor won the Nobel Prize in Physics "for his invention and development of the holographic method".
- 16 December
  - Banking and Financial Dealings Act passed, updating the definition of bank holidays in the U.K.
  - Trial of the Mangrove Nine, a group of black activists, concluded with them being acquitted of the most serious charge (incitement to riot at a 1970 protest against police targeting of The Mangrove, a London Caribbean restaurant) and judicial acknowledgement of behaviour motivated by racial hatred within the Metropolitan Police.
- 29 December – The United Kingdom gave up its military bases in Malta.
- 30 December – The seventh James Bond film – Diamonds Are Forever – was released. Sean Connery, who appeared in the first five films before being succeeded by George Lazenby for On Her Majesty's Secret Service in 1969, returned to the role for one final appearance in the official series of films.

=== Undated ===
- Inflation stood at a 30-year high of 8.6%.
- The government introduced a policy of Competition and Credit Control, lifting quantitative limits on lending by retail banks and allowing them greater freedom to offer savings accounts.
- The government imposed a rent freeze.
- Oil overtook coal as the most consumed fuel in the United Kingdom for the first time.
- David Hockney's acrylic painting Mr and Mrs Clark and Percy was completed.

== Publications ==
- Gerda Charles's novel The Destiny Waltz (winner of the first Whitbread Award for fiction).
- Agatha Christie's last-written Miss Marple mystery Nemesis.
- E. M. Forster's novel Maurice (completed 1914 and published posthumously).
- Frederick Forsyth's thriller The Day of the Jackal.
- Roger Hargreaves' children's book Mr. Tickle, first of the Mr. Men series (10 August).
- Spike Milligan's comic autobiography Adolf Hitler: My Part in His Downfall.
- V. S. Naipaul's novel In a Free State.
- Terry Pratchett's comic fantasy novel The Carpet People.
- Paul Scott's novel The Towers of Silence, third of the Raj Quartet.
- Keith Thomas' study Religion and the Decline of Magic: studies in popular beliefs in sixteenth and seventeenth century England.

== Births ==
=== January – March ===
- January – Katharine Viner, editor-in-chief, The Guardian
- 1 January – Andre Marriner, football referee
- 12 January – Jay Burridge, artist and television presenter
- 15 January – Lara Cazalet, actress
- 20 January – Gary Barlow, singer
- 21 January – Alan McManus, Scottish snooker player
- 23 January
  - Scott Gibbs, rugby player and sportscaster
  - Lisa Snowdon, English television and radio presenter and fashion model
- 29 January – Clare Balding, broadcaster, journalist and author
- 30 January – Darren Boyd, actor
- 31 January – Patrick Kielty, Northern Irish comedian and television presenter
- 2 February – Michelle Gayle, singer and actress
- 3 February
  - Sarah Kane, English playwright (suicide 1999)
  - Jayne Middlemiss, television presenter
- 11 February – Damian Lewis, English actor
- 13 February – Sonia, English pop singer
- 16 February
  - Amanda Holden, actress
  - Steven Houghton, actor and singer
- 23 February – Melinda Messenger, television presenter and model
- 24 February – Nicky Hambleton-Jones, television presenter and fashion expert
- 27 February – Derren Brown, illusionist
- 1 March – Thomas Adès, English classical composer, pianist and conductor
- 3 March – Charlie Brooker, English satirist
- 6 March
  - Claire Baker, Scottish politician
  - Geraldine O'Rawe, Northern Irish actress
- 7 March – Rachel Weisz, actress
- 13 March – Joey Beauchamp, footballer (died 2022)
- 15 March – Jason Wilcox, football player and manager
- 19 March – Dean Smith, football player and manager
- 23 March
  - Kate Dickie, Scottish actress
  - Gail Porter, television presenter.
- 27 March – David Coulthard, Scottish racing driver
- 28 March – Sayeeda Warsi, Baroness Warsi, politician and lawyer
- 31 March
  - Paul Grayson, Yorkshire cricketer
  - Ewan McGregor, Scottish actor

=== April – June ===
- 2 April – Jason Lewry, cricketer
- 3 April – Douglas Carswell, Conservative politician and MP for Harwich
- 11 April – John Leech, Liberal Democrat politician, shadow transport spokesperson, and MP for Manchester Withington
- 15 April – Kate Harbour, voice actress
- 16 April – Belinda Stewart-Wilson, actress
- 17 April – Claire Sweeney, actress
- 18 April
  - Samantha Cameron, businesswoman
  - David Tennant, Scottish actor
- 24 April – Adrian Simpson, television presenter
- 9 May
  - Jason Lee, footballer and manager
  - Paul McGuigan, musician and a founding member of Oasis
- 10 May – Simon Jack, journalist and broadcaster
- 17 May – Vernie Bennett, singer (Eternal)
- 21 May – Kevin Fong, doctor and broadcaster
- 23 May – George Osborne, Conservative politician, Chancellor of the Exchequer, and MP for Tatton
- 24 May – Emily Hamilton, actress
- 27 May
  - Paul Bettany, actor
  - Lee Sharpe, footballer
- 30 May – Shaun Bailey, Baron Bailey of Paddington, politician
- 3 June – Julian Sturdy, politician
- 5 June – Susan Lynch, Northern Irish actress
- 11 June
  - Liz Kendall, English politician
  - Pat McGrath, make-up artist
- 18 June – Nigel Owens, rugby union referee
- 20 June – Brandon Lewis, English lawyer and politician
- 22 June – Gary Connolly, English rugby player
- 25 June
  - Neil Lennon, Northern Irish footballer
  - Scott Maslen, English actor
- 28 June – Sean Dyche, English football player and manager

=== July – September ===
- 1 July – Rosie Duffield, English politician
- 8 July – Neil Jenkins, Welsh rugby player
- 14 July – Howard Webb, English football referee
- 13 July – MF Doom, British-American rapper
- 21 July – Charlotte Gainsbourg, British-French actress and singer
- 2 August
  - Alice Evans, actress
  - Michael Hughes, Northern Irish footballer
- 9 August – Kate Gerbeau, television presenter and newsreader
- 18 August - Aphex Twin (Richard D. James), Irish-born electronic music artist
- 20 August – David Walliams, comedian, actor and television personality
- 21 August – Liam Howlett, musician
- 26 August – Gaynor Faye, actress
- 29 August – Nicola Mendelsohn, business executive
- 31 August – Kirstie Allsopp, television presenter
- 1 September – Daniel Hannan, British Conservative politician, MEP for South East England
- 8 September – Martin Freeman, actor
- 11 September
  - Richard Ashcroft, English musician and singer (The Verve)
  - Clive Lewis, English politician
- 13 September
  - Louise Lombard, actress.
  - Stella McCartney, fashion designer
- 17 September – Parmjit Dhanda, British Labour politician, MP for Gloucester
- 22 September – Chesney Hawkes, English singer-songwriter
- 24 September – Es Devlin, set designer
- 25 September – Jessie Wallace, actress
- 28 September – Liza Walker, actress
- 29 September – Mackenzie Crook, English actor

=== October – December ===
- 6 October – Emily Mortimer, British actress
- 8 October – David Gauke, Lord Chancellor
- 13 October – Sacha Baron Cohen, British comedian
- 14 October – Andy Cole, English footballer
- 16 October – Craig Phillips, British reality show star, winner of Big Brother UK in 2000
- 21 October – Jade Jagger, jewellery designer
- 29 October – Lee Mason, football referee
- 30 October – John Alford, British actor and singer
- 3 November – Alison Williamson, archer
- 8 November – Michael Jeffrey, English footballer
- 17 November – Michael Adams, chess player
- 18 November – Thérèse Coffey, politician
- 22 November
  - Cath Bishop, British rower and Olympic medallist
  - Kyran Bracken, Irish-born rugby union footballer
- 1 December – Emily Mortimer, actress
- 5 December – Ashia Hansen, triple jumper
- 7 December – DeObia Oparei, actor
- 14 December – Lucie Stewart, British actress
- 10 December – Daniel Betts, actor
- 23 December – Tara Palmer-Tomkinson, British socialite and television presenter (died 2017)
- 25 December – Dido, English pop singer
- 27 December – Duncan Ferguson, football player and manager

== Deaths ==
=== January – March ===
- 12 January – John Tovey, British admiral of the fleet (born 1885)
- 24 January – St. John Greer Ervine, Northern Irish dramatist and author (born 1883)
- 28 January – Donald Winnicott, British psychoanalyst (born 1896)
- 6 March – Thurston Dart, English harpsichordist and conductor (born 1921)
- 7 March – Stevie Smith, English poet (born 1902)
- 16 March – Bebe Daniels, American-born actress (born 1901)

=== April – June ===
- 20 April – Cecil Parker, English film actor (born 1897)
- 1 May – Violet Jessop, survivor of the sinking of the RMS Titanic (born 1887)
- 15 May – Sir Tyrone Guthrie, English theatre director, producer and writer (born 1900)
- 20 May – Waldo Williams, Welsh language poet (born 1904)
- 6 June – Edward Andrade, English poet and physicist (born 1887)
- 10 June – Michael Rennie, English actor (born 1909)
- 25 June – John Boyd Orr, Scottish physician and biologist, recipient of the Nobel Peace Prize (born 1880)

=== July – September ===
- 1 July
  - William Lawrence Bragg, English physicist, Nobel Prize laureate (born 1890)
  - Learie Constantine, cricketer (born 1901 in Trinidad)
- 4 July – Sir Maurice Bowra, writer, critic and Vice-Chancellor of Oxford University (1951–1954) (born 1898 in China)
- 13 August – Sir Barry Domvile, admiral and Nazi sympathiser (born 1878)
- 19 July – John Jacob Astor, 1st Baron Astor of Hever, businessman (born 1886 in the United States)
- 27 July – Charlie Tully, Northern Irish footballer (born 1924)
- 30 August – Peter Fleming, travel writer and brother of Ian Fleming (born 1907)

=== October – December ===
- 11 November – A. P. Herbert, politician and writer (born 1890)
- 17 November – Gladys Cooper, actress (born 1888)
- 12 December
  - Torry Gillick, Rangers F.C. winger (born 1915)
  - Alan Morton, Rangers F.C. outside left (born 1893)
- 21 December – Charles C. Banks, pilot (born 1893)

=== Undated ===
- Reg Bunn, comic book artist (born 1905)
- Edith Garrud, pioneer martial artist and suffragist (born 1872)

== See also ==
- 1971 in British music
- 1971 in British television
- List of British films of 1971
