= 1971 in British radio =

This is a list of events in British radio during 1971.

== Events ==
=== January ===
- 3 January – The Open University begins broadcasts on the BBC.

=== February ===
- 1 February – Radio-only and combined radio & television licences are abolished.

=== March ===
- No events.

=== April ===
- No events.

=== May ===
- Michael Freedland presents the first edition of magazine programme You Don’t Have to be Jewish on BBC Radio London.

=== June to December ===
- No events.

== Station debuts ==
- 2 January – BBC Radio Newcastle
- 26 January – BBC Radio Blackburn
- 25 February – BBC Radio Humberside
- 29 April – BBC Radio Derby

== Programme debuts ==
- 15 February – Lines from My Grandfather's Forehead, BBC Radio 4 (1971–1972)
- 28 February (pilot), 5 December (series) – Parsley Sidings, BBC Radio 2 (1971–1973)
- May – You Don't Have to Be Jewish, BBC Radio London (1971–1995)

== Continuing radio programmes ==
=== 1940s ===
- Sunday Half Hour (1940–2018)
- Desert Island Discs (1942–Present)
- Down Your Way (1946–1992)
- Letter from America (1946–2004)
- Woman's Hour (1946–Present)
- A Book at Bedtime (1949–Present)

=== 1950s ===
- The Archers (1950–Present)
- The Today Programme (1957–Present)
- The Navy Lark (1959–1977)
- Sing Something Simple (1959–2001)
- Your Hundred Best Tunes (1959–2007)

=== 1960s ===
- Farming Today (1960–Present)
- In Touch (1961–Present)
- The Men from the Ministry (1962–1977)
- I'm Sorry, I'll Read That Again (1964–1973)
- Petticoat Line (1965–1979)
- The World at One (1965–Present)
- The Official Chart (1967–Present)
- Just a Minute (1967–Present)
- The Living World (1968–Present)
- The Organist Entertains (1969–2018)

=== 1970s ===
- PM (1970–Present)
- Start the Week (1970–Present)
- Week Ending (1970–1998)
- You and Yours (1970–Present)

== Births ==
- 5 January
  - Joanna Gosling, journalist and newsreader
  - Jayne Middlemiss, radio and television presenter
- 18 January
  - Leona Graham, broadcaster and voiceover artist
  - Eleri Siôn, Welsh radio and television presenter
- 29 January – Clare Balding, BBC Sports presenter, journalist and jockey
- 10 May – Simon Jack, financial journalist
- 23 May – Claudia Hammond, radio presenter
- 27 May – Petroc Trelawny, classical music presenter
- 1 June – Nihal Arthanayake, broadcaster
- 17 August – Bridget Christie, stand-up comedian
- 7 October – Aasmah Mir, Scottish-born radio presenter
- Katie Breathwick, radio presenter

== Deaths ==
- 28 May – Ralph Wightman, writer and broadcaster on countryside matters (born 1901)
- 16 June – John Reith, 1st Baron Reith, Scottish broadcasting executive (born 1889)

== See also ==
- 1971 in British music
- 1971 in British television
- 1971 in the United Kingdom
- List of British films of 1971
