= Penpol =

Penpol may refer to several places in Cornwall, England:

- Penpol Creek (River Fowey), a creek in St Veep parish
- Penpol, Feock, a hamlet on Penpol Creek, in Feock parish
- Penpol, Lesnewth, a listed building
- Higher Penpol, Middle Penpol and Lower Penpol, hamlets in St Veep parish

== See also ==
- Penpoll a farm in the parish of Quethiock
