= 1971 in British music =

This is a summary of 1971 in music in the United Kingdom, including the official charts from that year.

== Events ==
- 3 February – Davy Jones announces he is leaving the Monkees.
- 1 March – Bassist John Deacon joins Queen.
- 4 March – The Rolling Stones open their UK tour in Newcastle upon Tyne, intended as a "farewell" to the UK prior to the band's relocation to France as "tax exiles".
- 5 March – Ulster Hall, Belfast, Northern Ireland, sees the first live performance of Led Zeppelin's song "Stairway to Heaven".
- 6 April – The Rolling Stones hold a party in Cannes to officially announce their new contract with Atlantic and the launch of Rolling Stones Records.
- 12 May – Mick Jagger marries Bianca de Macías in Saint-Tropez, France, in a Roman Catholic ceremony. Paul McCartney, Ringo Starr, and their wives are among the wedding guests.
- 16 May – BBC television makes the first broadcast of Benjamin Britten's opera for television, Owen Wingrave.
- 20-24 June – The first Glastonbury Festival to take place at the summer solstice is held in South West England. Performers include David Bowie, Traffic, Fairport Convention, Quintessence and Hawkwind.
- 19–24 July – Benjamin Britten conducts recording of Edward Elgar's The Dream of Gerontius at Snape Maltings.
- 1 August – The Concert for Bangladesh takes place at Madison Square Garden, New York, starring Ravi Shankar, George Harrison, Ringo Starr, Bob Dylan, and Leon Russell. It also features Billy Preston, Eric Clapton, Jesse Ed Davis, and Badfinger.
- 14 August – The Who release their fifth studio album Who's Next, reaching number one in both the UK and the US.
- 8 November – Led Zeppelin release their officially untitled fourth studio album, which would become the band's biggest-selling album.

== Number-one records ==
=== Singles ===
Date	Single	Artist
9 January	"Grandad"	Clive Dunn
16 January	"Grandad"	Clive Dunn
23 January	"Grandad"	Clive Dunn
30 January	"My Sweet Lord"	George Harrison
6 February	"My Sweet Lord"	George Harrison
13 February	"My Sweet Lord"	George Harrison
20 February	"My Sweet Lord"	George Harrison
27 February	"My Sweet Lord"	George Harrison
6 March	"Baby Jump"	Mungo Jerry
13 March	"Baby Jump"	Mungo Jerry
20 March	"Hot Love"	T. Rex
27 March	"Hot Love"	T. Rex
3 April	"Hot Love"	T. Rex
10 April	"Hot Love"	T. Rex
17 April	"Hot Love"	T. Rex
24 April	"Hot Love"	T. Rex
1 May	"Double Barrel"	Dave & Ansel Collins
8 May	"Double Barrel"	Dave & Ansel Collins
15 May	"Knock Three Times"	Dawn
22 May	"Knock Three Times"	Dawn
29 May	"Knock Three Times"	Dawn
5 June	"Knock Three Times"	Dawn
12 June	"Knock Three Times"	Dawn
19 June	"Chirpy Chirpy Cheep Cheep"	Middle of the Road
26 June	"Chirpy Chirpy Cheep Cheep"	Middle of the Road
3 July	"Chirpy Chirpy Cheep Cheep"	Middle of the Road
10 July	"Chirpy Chirpy Cheep Cheep"	Middle of the Road
17 July	"Chirpy Chirpy Cheep Cheep"	Middle of the Road
24 July	"Get It On"	T. Rex
31 July	"Get It On"	T. Rex
7 August	"Get It On"	T. Rex
14 August	"Get It On"	T. Rex
21 August	"I'm Still Waiting"	Diana Ross
28 August	"I'm Still Waiting"	Diana Ross
4 September	"I'm Still Waiting"	Diana Ross
11 September	"I'm Still Waiting"	Diana Ross
18 September	"Hey Girl Don't Bother Me"	The Tams
25 September	"Hey Girl Don't Bother Me"	The Tams
2 October	"Hey Girl Don't Bother Me"	The Tams
9 October	"Maggie May" / Reason to Believe"	Rod Stewart
16 October	"Maggie May" / Reason to Believe"	Rod Stewart
23 October	"Maggie May" / Reason to Believe"	Rod Stewart
30 October	"Maggie May" / Reason to Believe"	Rod Stewart
6 November	"Maggie May" / Reason to Believe"	Rod Stewart
13 November	"Coz I Luv You"	Slade
20 November	"Coz I Luv You"	Slade
27 November	"Coz I Luv You"	Slade
4 December	"Coz I Luv You"	Slade
11 December	"Ernie (The Fastest Milkman in the West)"	Benny Hill
18 December	"Ernie (The Fastest Milkman in the West)"	Benny Hill
25 December	"Ernie (The Fastest Milkman in the West)"	Benny Hill
1 January	"Ernie (The Fastest Milkman in the West)"	Benny Hill

=== Albums ===
Date	Single	Artist
9 January	Greatest Hits	Andy Williams
16 January	Bridge Over Troubled Water	Simon & Garfunkel
23 January	Bridge Over Troubled Water	Simon & Garfunkel
30 January	Bridge Over Troubled Water	Simon & Garfunkel
6 February	All Things Must Pass	George Harrison
13 February	All Things Must Pass	George Harrison
20 February	All Things Must Pass	George Harrison
27 February	All Things Must Pass	George Harrison
6 March	All Things Must Pass	George Harrison
13 March	All Things Must Pass	George Harrison
20 March	All Things Must Pass	George Harrison
27 March	All Things Must Pass	George Harrison
3 April	Home Lovin' Man	Andy Williams
10 April	Home Lovin' Man	Andy Williams
17 April	Motown Chartbusters Vol.5	Various Artists
24 April	Motown Chartbusters Vol.5	Various Artists
1 May	Motown Chartbusters Vol.5	Various Artists
8 May	Sticky Fingers	The Rolling Stones
15 May	Sticky Fingers	The Rolling Stones
22 May	Sticky Fingers	The Rolling Stones
29 May	Sticky Fingers	The Rolling Stones
5 June	Ram	Paul & Linda McCartney
12 June	Ram	Paul & Linda McCartney
19 June	Sticky Fingers	The Rolling Stones
26 June	Tarkus	Emerson, Lake & Palmer
3 July	Bridge Over Troubled Water	Simon & Garfunkel
10 July	Bridge Over Troubled Water	Simon & Garfunkel
17 July	Bridge Over Troubled Water	Simon & Garfunkel
24 July	Bridge Over Troubled Water	Simon & Garfunkel
31 July	Bridge Over Troubled Water	Simon & Garfunkel
7 August	Hot Hits 6	Various Artists
14 August	Every Good Boy Deserves Favour	The Moody Blues
21 August	Top of the Pops, Volume 18	Various Artists
28 August	Top of the Pops, Volume 18	Various Artists
4 September	Top of the Pops, Volume 18	Various Artists
11 September	Bridge Over Troubled Water	Simon & Garfunkel
18 September	Who's Next	The Who
25 September	Fireball	Deep Purple
2 October	Every Picture Tells a Story	Rod Stewart
9 October	Every Picture Tells a Story	Rod Stewart
16 October	Every Picture Tells a Story	Rod Stewart
23 October	Every Picture Tells a Story	Rod Stewart
30 October	Imagine	John Lennon
6 November	Imagine	John Lennon
13 November	Every Picture Tells a Story	Rod Stewart
20 November	Every Picture Tells a Story	Rod Stewart
27 November	Top of the Pops, Volume 20	Various Artists
4 December	Four Symbols	Led Zeppelin
11 December	Four Symbols	Led Zeppelin
18 December	Electric Warrior	T. Rex
25 December	Electric Warrior	T. Rex
1 January	Electric Warrior	T. Rex

== Year-end charts ==
=== Best-selling singles ===
(Covering 16th Jan to 18th Dec 1971) (Cited from Spotify)

1. "My Sweet Lord" – George Harrison 890,000
2. "Maggie May/Reason to Believe" – Rod Stewart 615,000 in total
3. "Chirpy Chirpy Cheep Cheep" – Middle of the Road 614,000 in total
4. "Knock Three Times" – Dawn 531,500
5. "Hot Love" – T. Rex 530,000
6. "The Pushbike Song" – The Mixtures 500,000
7. "Never Ending Song of Love" – The New Seekers 421,000
8. "I'm Still Waiting" – Diana Ross 420,000
9. "Hey Girl Don't Bother Me" – The Tams 415,000
10. "Get It On" – T-Rex 413,000
11. "Coz I Luv You" – Slade 410,000
12. "Amazing Grace" – Judy Collins 405,000
13. "Grandad" – Clive Dunn 400,000
14. "Double Barrel" – Dave and Ansil Collins 395,000
15. "Rose Garden" – Lynn Anderson 394,000
16. "Baby Jump" – Mungo Jerry 388,000
17. "Did You Ever" – Nancy Sinatra & Lee Hazlewood 370,000
18. "For All We Know" – Shirley Bassey 362,000
19. "Brown Sugar" – The Rolling Stones 360,000
20. "Stoned Love" – The Supremes 355,000
21. "Co-Co" – Sweet 354,000
22. "It's Impossible" – Perry Como 351,000
23. "Ernie (The Fastest Milkman in the West)" – Benny Hill 350,000
24. "The Resurrection Shuffle" – Ashton, Gardner & Dyke 345,000
25. "Another Day" – Paul McCartney 344,000
26. "The Witch Queen of New Orleans" – Redbone 340,000
27. "Tweedle Dee, Tweedle Dum" – Middle of the Road 336,000
28. "I Did What I Did for Maria" – Tony Christie 335,000
29. "Bridget the Midget" – Ray Stevens 335,000
30. "The Banner Man" – Blue Mink 331,000
31. "Till" – Tom Jones 330,000
32. "You've Got a Friend" – James Taylor 326,000
33. "Mozart 40" – Waldo De Los Rios 325,000
34. "Jeepster" – T-Rex 325,000
35. "Indiana Wants Me" – R. Dean Taylor 324,000
36. "I'm Gonna Run Away from You" – Tami Lynn 322,000
37. "Don't Let It Die" – Hurricane Smith 320,000
38. "He's Gonna Step On You Again" – John Kongos 315,000
39. "Back Street Luv" – Curved Air 310,000
40. "Tom-Tom Turnaround" – New World 305,000
41. "What are You Doing Sunday" – Dawn 300,000
42. "It Don't Come Easy" – Ringo Starr 295,000
43. "Me and You and a Dog Named Boo" – Lobo 295,000
44. "In My Own Time" – Family 285,000
45. "Johnny Reggae" – The Piglets 284,000
46. "No Matter What" – Badfinger 282,000
47. "Gypsies, Tramps and Thieves" – Cher 281,0000
48. "I Believe (In Love)" – Hot Chocolate 280,000
49. "The Devil’s Answer" – Atomic Rooster 265,000
50. "Banks of the Ohio" – Olivia Newton-John 260,000

=== Best-selling albums ===
The list of the top fifty best-selling albums of 1971 were published in Record Mirror at the end of the year, and later reproduced in the first edition of the BPI Year Book in 1976. However, in 2007 the Official Charts Company published album chart histories for each year from 1956 to 1977, researched by historian Sharon Mawer, and included an updated list of the top ten best-selling albums for each year based on the new research. The updated top ten for 1971 is shown in the table below.

No.	Title	Artist	Peak position
1	Bridge over Troubled Water	Simon & Garfunkel	1
2	Every Picture Tells a Story	Rod Stewart	1
3	Sticky Fingers	The Rolling Stones	1
4	Motown Chartbusters Vol. 5	Various Artists	1
5	Electric Warrior	T. Rex	1
6	Ram	Paul and Linda McCartney	1
7	Tapestry	Carole King	4
8	Every Good Boy Deserves Favour	The Moody Blues	1
9	Greatest Hits	Andy Williams	1
10	Mud Slide Slim and the Blue Horizon	James Taylor	4

== Classical music: new works ==
- Benjamin Britten – Cello Suite No. 3

== Film and incidental music ==
- John Barry –
  - Diamonds Are Forever, starring Sean Connery.
  - Mary, Queen of Scots, starring Vanessa Redgrave and Glenda Jackson.
  - Walkabout directed by Nicolas Roeg, starring Jenny Agutter.
- Richard Rodney Bennett – Nicholas and Alexandra.
- Roy Budd – Get Carter, starring Michael Caine.

== Births ==
- 8 January – Karen Poole (Alisha's Attic)
- 11 January – Tom Rowlands (Chemical Brothers)
- 13 January – Lee Agnew (Nazareth)
- 20 January – Gary Barlow, singer-songwriter (Take That)
- 2 February – Michelle Gayle, actress and singer
- 13 February – Sonia, singer
- 16 February – Steven Houghton, actor and singer
- 1 March – Thomas Adès, composer
- 6 March – Betty Boo, singer
- 26 March – John Hendy, singer (East 17)
- 31 March – Ewan McGregor, actor and singer
- 6 May – Sarah Blackwood, singer (Dubstar)
- 9 May – Paul McGuigan bassist (Oasis)
- 14 May – Matthew Pateman, singer (Bad Boys Inc)
- 17 May – Vernie Bennett, singer (Eternal)
- 31 May – Adam Walton, DJ
- 4 June – Tony McCarroll, drummer (Oasis)
- 30 June – Bastiaan Ragas, Dutch-born singer (Caught in the Act)
- 14 July – Nick McCabe, English guitarist (The Verve and Black Submarine)
- 25 August – Joby Talbot, composer
- 11 September – Richard Ashcroft, singer and songwriter (The Verve)
- 21 September – Jimmy Constable, singer (911)
- 18 October – Mark Morriss, singer (The Bluetones)
- 30 October – John Alford, singer and actor
- 5 November – Jonny Greenwood, musician, songwriter and composer
- 19 November – Justin Chancellor, musician (Tool, Peach)
- 21 November – Karen Ramirez, singer
- 12 December – Johnny Dean, singer (Menswear)
- 25 December – Dido, singer
- date unknown
  - Richard Causton, composer and teacher
  - Daniel Giorgetti, composer of concert music and film and television scores

== Deaths ==
- 11 January – Irene Scharrer, pianist, 82
- 1 February – Harry Roy, bandleader, 71
- 6 March – Thurston Dart, harpsichordist and conductor, 49
- 30 March – Harold Craxton, pianist and composer, 85
- 21 May – Dennis King, actor and singer, 73
- 11 June – Ambrose, bandleader and violinist, 74
- 16 June – Ellaline Terriss, actress and singer, 100

== See also ==
- 1971 in British radio
- 1971 in British television
- 1971 in the United Kingdom
- List of British films of 1971
