= The House That Screamed (1969 film) =

- Spanish theatrical release poster
- Spanish: La residencia
- Literally: The Residence
- Directed by: Narciso Ibáñez Serrador
- Screenplay by: Narciso Ibáñez Serrador
- Based on: La residencia by Juan Tébar
- Produced by: Javier Armet
- Starring: Lilli Palmer; Cristina Galbó; John Moulder-Brown; Mary Maude
- Cinematography: Manuel Berenguer; Godofredo Pacheco
- Edited by: Mercedes Alonso; Reginald Mills
- Music by: Waldo de los Ríos
- Production company: Anabel Films
- Distributed by: Regia-Arturo González Rodríguez
- Release date: 8 December 1969
- Running time: 104 minutes (Note: The film's original running time is 104 minutes, though it was released in varying cuts internationally, ranging from 94 to 96 minutes.)
- Country: Spain
- Language: English
- Box office: 100 million Pts (Spain)

The House That Screamed (Spanish: La residencia, lit. The Residence), also released as The Finishing School, is a 1969 Spanish gothic slasher film written and directed by Narciso Ibáñez Serrador, and starring Lilli Palmer, Cristina Galbó, John Moulder-Brown, and Mary Maude. It follows Señora Fourneau, the strict headmistress of a nineteenth-century French boarding school for girls where the students begin to disappear under unusual circumstances.

Based on a short story by Juan Tébar and filmed in Comillas, it was the first Spanish film production to be shot with English dialogue. It was released in Spain in December 1969, where it was a box-office hit, grossing 100 million Spanish pesetas with nearly 3 million audience admissions. In 1971, American International Pictures acquired the film for distribution in the United States, where it was released under the alternative title, The House That Screamed. American International Pictures cut the film down to 94 minutes to avoid it receiving an X rating from the Motion Picture Association, who ultimately granted it a GP rating.

It has been noted by film scholars as an early progenitor of the slasher film, and served as an influence on a number of horror films that followed, including Suspiria (1977) and Pieces (1982).

== Plot ==
In a 19th-century French boarding school for troubled girls, Headmistress Señora Fourneau forbids her teenage son Luis from going near any of the girls, finding none of them good enough for him and saying he should find someone like her. Eighteen-year-old Teresa Garan arrives at the school to be enrolled, and notices odd occurrences at the boarding school from the moment of her arrival, specifically the sense of being watched or followed.

Señora Forneau, a strict disciplinarian, abuses the unruly students by means of beatings and flagellation, with the help of Irene Tupan, a senior student whom she has taken as a protégé. When one of the girls goes missing one night, Irene is blamed by Señora Forneau for not keeping close account of the keys that allow entry in and out of the school. Meanwhile, Teresa begins a romance with Luis, but grows increasingly unnerved by the atmosphere of the school and the multiple disappearances of students. She is also bullied by her peers, who torment her because of her mother's past as a prostitute.

In the middle of the night, Teresa plans an escape. Irene awakens to her leaving, and rushes outside to the gate, hoping to stop her. Teresa first goes to say goodbye to Luis, who gives her money from his savings to help her with travel expenses. As Teresa attempts to break out of a window downstairs, she is attacked by an unseen figure who kills her by slashing her throat. Irene returns to the school later and finds the windowsill in the parlor soaked with rainwater from the storm. Irene confronts Señora Fourneau, insisting that Teresa could not have escaped; she also tells her she plans to leave the school, and will blackmail Fourneau over her abuses if necessary. Fourneau forces Irene to hand over her keys.

Later that evening, Señora Fourneau catches Irene attempting to escape, and follows her as she flees upstairs, eventually hiding in the attic. Señora Fourneau ascends to the attic, where she finds Irene stabbed to death, and her hands severed from her body. In a secret chamber of the attic, Señora Fourneau finds her son with a corpse made up of various dismembered female body parts. Señora Fourneau realizes Luis' frustrated desires have forced psychotic urges to the surface, compelling him to stalk the hapless girls to acquire body parts in order to create his own "ideal woman" with features similar to his mother. Luis then locks up his mother in the room so that she can teach his creation to love and care for Luis like she does. Señora Fourneau screams.

== Cast ==
- Lilli Palmer as Señora Fourneau
- Cristina Galbó as Teresa Garan
- John Moulder-Brown as Luis Fourneau
- Mary Maude as Irene Tupan
- Maribel Martín as Isabel
- Cándida Losada as Señorita Despez
- Pauline Challoner as Catalina
- Tomás Blanco as Pedro Baldie
- Víctor Israel as Brechard
- Teresa Hurtado as Andrea
- María José Valero as Elena
- Conchita Paredes as Susana
- Ana María Pol as Claudia
- Mari Carmen Duque as Julia
- Paloma Pagés as Cecelia
- María Elena Arpón as Student

== Production ==
La residencia was director Narciso Ibáñez Serrador's first horror film and produced by Javier Armet through his company Anabel Films. The screenplay is based on a short story by Juan Tébar. Serrador wrote the screenplay under the name "Luis Penafiel."

The film was created as a commercial film with the express purpose of breaking into the international market, and was the first Spanish film produced with English dialogue. Filming took place in Comillas, Cantabria, Spain. Because the film was made up of both English and Spanish actors, the film was shot with the actors performing in both English and Spanish languages. The film was dubbed entirely in English in post-production, making it the first Spanish film presented in English.

== Release ==
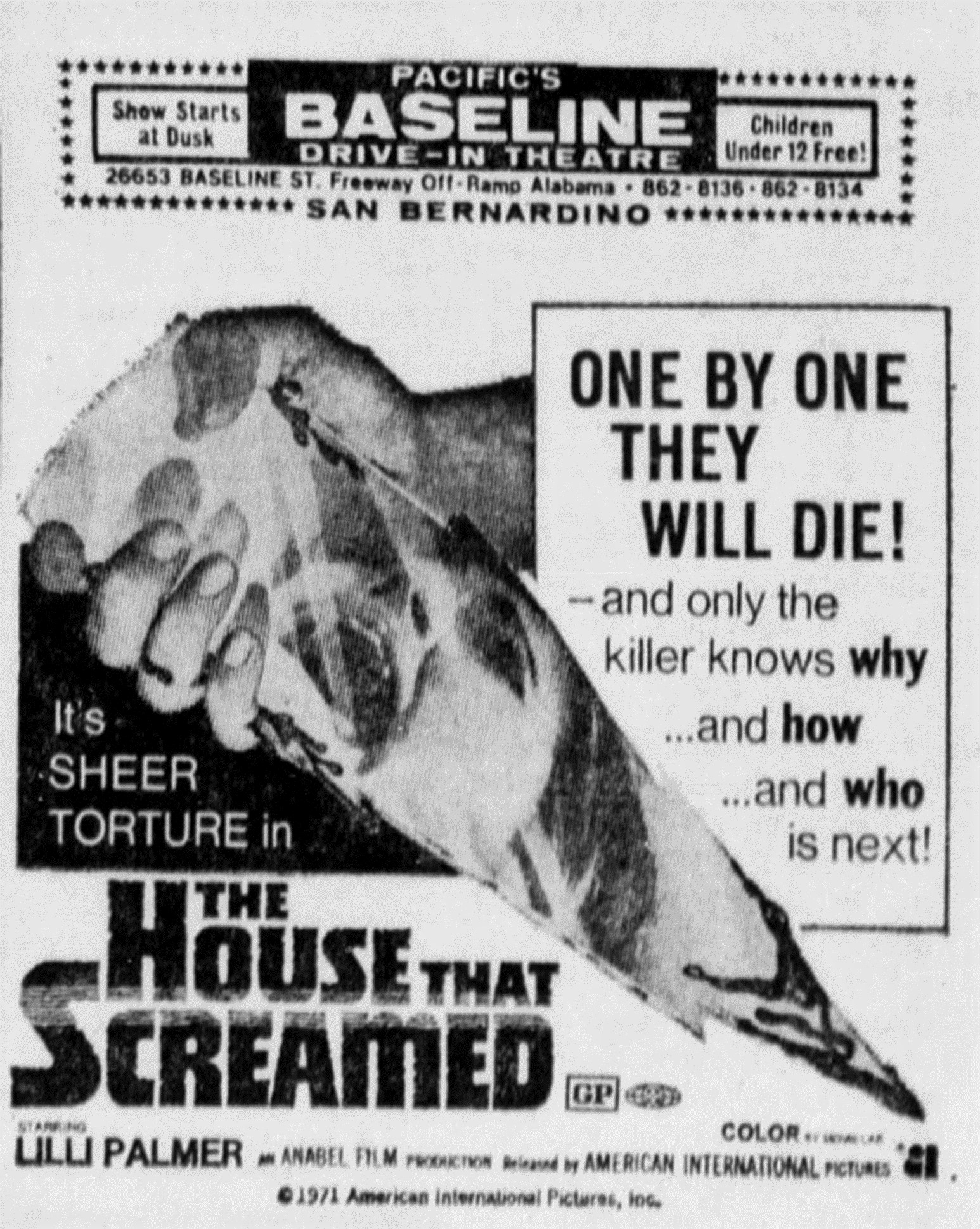
Drive-in advertisement, March 24 1971

The film was released in Spain on 8 December 1969. It later received a theatrical release in the United States under the title The House That Screamed through American International Pictures, opening on 16 March 1971 in Tucson, Arizona, and expanding to other regional U.S. markets throughout the remainder of the month. It had its premiere in New York City on 21 July 1971.

In the United States, the film was given a GP rating by the Motion Picture Association of America after being cut down to 94 minutes, ensuring that it would not receive an X rating. In an issue of Filmfacts published in 1971, it was noted: "That The House That Screamed should receive a mild 'GP' rating is ironic proof that there lingers in some minds a crazy kind of puritanical logic, the evils of which are so morbidly epitomized in this grisly horror film."

The film was released under another alternate title, The Finishing School, in other countries such as Australia.

Director Narciso Ibáñez Serrador did not appreciate how the film had been promoted, stating that it was "terribly promoted, promoted with clichés". The film was released by American International Pictures in the United States and did not do well with contemporary American audiences.

=== Box office ===
The film was a financial success in Spain, totaling 2,924,836 admissions and becoming the highest-grossing film in Spain at the time, grossing 45 million Spanish pesetas (roughly $640,000 U.S. dollars at the time) in its first six months and 83 million pesetas by the end of the year. It eventually grossed 100 million pesetas (€750,715).

=== Critical response ===
The film was released in Spain to mixed reviews. Antonio Pelayo of Cinestudio wrote a review questioning the budget of the film, stating that other Spanish directors could have produced "at least two films of the same technical standard". Pérez Gómez of Reseña wrote a positive review, stating that the film was "respectable commercial cinema." Miguel Marías of Nuestro Cine found the film disrespectful to cinema and audiences, stating that financial support for such films that "insult her/him, and consider her/him a retard whose subnormality needs to be fed". Marías also critiqued film critics who supported the film.

Kevin Thomas of the Los Angeles Times praised the film's period details and performances, describing it as "a thoroughly convincing, even elegant exercise in evil... All this depravity has been served up with considerable skill." Thomas added that Palmer "works hard to give humanity and tragic dimension to her part," but concluded that the film ultimately "exploits rather than indicts what it lovingly depicts." A. H. Weiler of The New York Times wrote of the film: "Miss Palmer and moviegoer deserve all the sympathy they can get."

Film scholars have compared the film's narrative to that of Psycho (1960), and have noted its "Oedipal and Sadean overtones."

=== Home media ===
The film was released on DVD as part of the Shout! Factory Double Feature series, where it was paired with Maneater of Hydra. As with other releases in the series, the movie is viewable both with and without the Elvira commentary.

On December 27, 2016, the film was released on Blu-ray by Shout! Factory's subsidiary Scream Factory in North America, featuring the U.S. theatrical cut of the film, as well as the 104-minute original cut. This edition went out-of-print on 23 December 2020. In March 2023, Arrow Films released a newly-restored Blu-ray edition with newly-commissioned bonus materials.

== Legacy ==
The House That Screamed inspired a number of subsequent horror and slasher films, such as Dario Argento's Suspiria (1977) and Juan Piquer Simón's Pieces (1982).

== Sources ==
- Benshoff, Harry M., ed. (2017). A Companion to the Horror Film. West Sussex, England: John Wiley & Sons. ISBN 978-1-119-33501-6.
- Craig, Robert (2019). American International Pictures: A Comprehensive Filmography. Jefferson, North Carolina: McFarland. ISBN 978-1-476-66631-0.
- Hortelano, Lorenzo J. Torres, ed. (2011). Directory of World Cinema: Spain. Bristol, England: Intellect Ltd. ISBN 978-1-841-50463-6.
- Willis, Andrew; Lázaro-Reboll, Antonio (2004). Spanish Popular Cinema. Manchester, England: Manchester University Press. ISBN 978-0-719-06282-7.
- Lazaro-Reboll, Antonio (2012). Spanish Horror Film. Edinburgh, Scotland: Edinburgh University Press. ISBN 978-0-748-67062-8.
- Schlegel, Nicholas (2015). Sex, Sadism, Spain, and Cinema: The Spanish Horror Film. Lanham, Maryland: Rowman & Littlefield. ISBN 978-1-442-25115-1.
- Sipos, Thomas (2010). Horror Film Aesthetics: Creating the Visual Language of Fear. Jefferson, North Carolina: McFarland. ISBN 978-0-786-44972-9.
- Smith, Gary A. (2009). The American International Pictures Video Guide. Jefferson, North Carolina: McFarland. ISBN 978-0-786-43309-4.
