= Sword of the Valiant =

1984 British fantasy film

Sword of the Valiant: The Legend of Sir Gawain and the Green Knight
- Original movie poster
- Directed by: Stephen Weeks
- Written by: Philip M. Breen; Howard C. Pen; Stephen Weeks
- Produced by: Yoram Globus; Menahem Golan
- Starring: Miles O'Keeffe; Sean Connery; Cyrielle Clair; Trevor Howard; Peter Cushing
- Cinematography: Peter Hurst; Freddie Young
- Music by: Ron Geesin
- Distributed by: The Cannon Group Inc.
- Release date: 1984
- Running time: 102 minutes
- Country: United Kingdom
- Language: English

Sword of the Valiant: The Legend of Sir Gawain and the Green Knight (often shortened to Sword of the Valiant) is a 1984 dramatic fantasy film directed by Stephen Weeks and starring Miles O'Keeffe, Trevor Howard, Lila Kedrova, Cyrielle Clair, Leigh Lawson, Peter Cushing, and Sean Connery. The film is loosely based on the poem Sir Gawain and the Green Knight, written in the late 14th century, but the narrative differs substantially. It was the second time Weeks had adapted the traditional tale into a film. His first effort was Gawain and the Green Knight (1973).

== Plot ==
During Yuletide, a knight in green armor enters King Arthur's castle and challenges its knights to a game - they can decapitate him in one swing of his ax, with the caveat that he can return the blow. None of the knights volunteer. Arthur shames them for their lack of courage and accepts the challenge himself. Finally, Gawain, a young squire, accepts the challenge in lieu of Arthur, and is knighted. He beheads the green knight. The knight picks up his head and returns it to his neck. Gawain kneels to be stricken, but the green knight refuses due to the former's youth. Promising to return in one year to claim his side of the bargain, the green knight gives Gawain a chance to solve a riddle to save his life:

Where life is emptiness, gladness.
Where life is darkness, fire.
Where life is golden, sorrow.
Where life is lost, wisdom.

With Arthur's blessing, Gawain leaves with squire Humphrey in search of the riddle's answer. Morgan le Fay instructs Gawain to blow a horn near the seashore, and to go to the lost city of Lyonesse. Upon blowing the horn, a knight in black armor reveals himself to be the guardian of Lyonesse, and challenges Gawain to a duel. Despite the guardian's dishonorable conduct in the duel, Gawain wins. The guardian, dying, asks to be brought home to Lyonesse. Gawain rides there with the guardian, and Humphrey gets separated from Gawain. At Lyonesse, before dying, the guardian accuses Gawain of murdering him. Pursued by the city guard, Gawain escapes with the help of maiden Linet, who gives him her ring, which makes him invisible. Gawain attempts to escape Lyonesse with Linet, but she is captured. While held by the guards, Linet gives her ring to Gawain. Abruptly appearing in an empty field, Gawain is told by the green knight that the game he accepted has rules which have been broken by meeting Linet at the wrong time, and taking her ring. Encountering a group of monks, Gawain asks friar Vosper for help with the riddle; Vosper tells Gawain to see the sage at the rock of wisdom.

Gawain agrees to follow the game's rules and is transported to Lyonesse by the sage. Lyonesse now is decrepit, and the denizens are old and frozen in time. Gawain carries the frozen Linet to a small house outside of Lyonesse, revives her and restores her youth using the ring. Gawain encounters Humphrey, but while away from the house, Linet is kidnapped by the lustful prince Oswald and the army of his father, Baron Fortinbras. To save Linet, Gawain and Humphrey sneak into Fortinbras's castle by blending in with prisoners being transported there. Inside, Gawain rallies the prisoners to help escape the castle and rescue Linet. Meanwhile, Sir Bertilak, a rival of Fortinbras, arrives and threatens the latter with war if certain demands are not met. While the prisoners escape, the rescue fails when a fire breaks out in Linet's prison, leading Gawain to wrongfully believe that she is dead. Mournful, Gawain leaves Humphrey and the escaped prisoners, wandering aimlessly before stumbling across Bertilak's castle. Bertilak allows Gawain to rest and recover in his castle. There, Bertilak accepts Linet as a tribute from Fortinbras to prevent war. Linet gives Gawain a green sash, saying that no harm will befall him while he wears it.

The year given by the green knight comes to an end. Gawain, meeting with Humphrey and the former prisoners, goes out seeking the green knight. Oswald and Fortinbras's army attack Gawain. Oswald challenges Gawain to a duel with his champions. After defeating several of Oswald's champions, Oswald himself fights Gawain while the former prisoners fight his army. Gawain wins the duel, and the army retreats. The green knight then approaches Gawain. Gawain fails to solve the riddle's final line within the time limit, and must allow the green knight one swing at his neck. The green knight strikes Gawain, who is unharmed due to the sash. The two duel, and while suffering a mortal wound, the knight asks Gawain to stop the battle, realizing that he has already lost.

Gawain returns to Linet, who says that she must return to Lyonesse alone. As he touches her cheek, she transforms into a dove, and flies away.

== Cast ==
- Miles O'Keeffe as Sir Gawain
- Cyrielle Clair as Linet
- Leigh Lawson as Humphrey
- Sean Connery as The Green Knight
- Trevor Howard as King Arthur
- Peter Cushing as Seneschal / Gaspar
- Ronald Lacey as Oswald
- Lila Kedrova as Lady of Lyonesse
- John Rhys-Davies as Baron Fortinbras
- Wilfrid Brambell as Porter
- Bruce Lidington as Sir Bertilak
- Douglas Wilmer as The Black Knight
- Brian Coburn as Friar Vosper
- David Rappaport as Sage
- Emma Sutton as Morgan Le Fay

== Production ==
The film was copyrighted in 1983 and released the following year. Filming took place in Wales and Ireland, as well as the Château de Pierrefonds and the Palais des Papes in France. The period wardrobe was culled from the collections of stock rooms of the Royal National Theatre and the Bristol Old Vic as well as Berman's and Nathan's, the French Aristide Boyer and the Spanish Cornejo.

Director Stephen Weeks hoped to cast Mark Hamill as Gawain, but producers Menahem Golan and Yoram Globus insisted on Miles O'Keeffe for the role. The film also stars Emma Sutton who would later appear in another film about the Arthurian legends, Merlin of the Crystal Cave.

Steptoe and Son actor Wilfrid Brambell made a guest appearance. This was his last performance.

The current USA DVD release has received negative reviews as it is mastered in a 4:3 pan and scan picture. However, the Polish release has the film in the original 2.35:1 Cinemascope ratio which has proved more popular. This film is currently unreleased in the United Kingdom. The film received a Blu-ray release in the United States on October 14, 2020, by Scorpion Releasing.

== Reception ==
Reviewing the film, Time Out London magazine gave it a negative review. It described Sword of the Valiant as "underwhelming" and added "Dreary jousting, production values that make Monty Python and the Holy Grail look lavish, and an excruciating synthesizer score make this a real trial." On Metacritic the film has a weighted average score of 12 out of 100, based on 4 critics, indicating "Overwhelming dislike".

== See also ==
- List of films based on Arthurian legend
