= Richard Hurndall =

English actor (1910–1984)

- Born: Richard Gibbon Hurndall; 3 November 1910; Darlington, County Durham, England
- Died: 13 April 1984 (aged 73); London, England
- Education: Royal Academy of Dramatic Art
- Occupation: Actor
- Known for: Replacing William Hartnell as the First Doctor in The Five Doctors

Richard Gibbon Hurndall (3 November 1910 – 13 April 1984) was an English actor. He is best remembered for replacing William Hartnell in the role of the First Doctor for Doctor Who's 20th anniversary special "The Five Doctors".

== Career ==
=== BBC radio ===
Hurndall was born in Darlington and he attended Claremont Preparatory School, Darlington and Scarborough College, before training as an actor at the Royal Academy of Dramatic Arts. He then appeared in several plays at Stratford-upon-Avon. Hurndall acted with the BBC Radio Drama repertory company from 1949 to 1952. In 1959, he played Sherlock Holmes in a five part adaptation of The Sign of Four. He continued to play roles on BBC radio until about 1980, often as the leading man.

=== Radio Luxembourg ===
In 1958 he became the third host of the Radio Luxembourg program called This I Believe. (This show had originally been hosted by Edward R. Murrow on the U.S. CBS Radio Network from 1951 to 1955 and it was then edited in London for rebroadcast on 208 with a British style of presentation at 9:30 p.m. on Sunday evenings.)

=== Television work ===
Hurndall appeared in numerous radio and stage plays, films and television series over the course of his lengthy career. He appeared in Someone at the Door, a 1949 live-broadcast TV comedy/thriller, which also featured Patrick Troughton (with whom he was later to appear in Doctor Who – see below). Other television shows of the era that he appeared in include The Avengers, The Persuaders!, Blake's 7, Whodunnit! and Bergerac. He played the suave London gangster Mackelson in the gritty 1968 drama series Spindoe and the following year had a recurring role as flawed senior civil servant Jason Fowler in the final series of The Power Game. He appeared in the comedy series Steptoe and Son in 1970 as Timothy, a gay antique dealer who takes a shine to Harold Steptoe. He also guest-starred in the third series of Callan. He appeared twice in the drama series Public Eye, first playing a distinguished entomologist who is unwilling to trace his missing son in "The Golden Boy" (10 January 1973), and later a priest in "How About a Cup of Tea?" (13 January 1975). He was Lord Montdore in Love in a Cold Climate (1980).

=== Doctor Who ===
In 1983, to celebrate the 20th anniversary of the BBC science fiction television series Doctor Who, producer John Nathan-Turner planned a special event, "The Five Doctors", a 90-minute episode to feature four of the five actors who had at that point played the role of the Doctor. William Hartnell, the actor who originated the role, had died in 1975. Hurndall eventually won the role of the First Doctor, playing him as "acerbic and temperamental but in some ways wiser than his successors." His casting in the role was approved by Hartnell's widow, Heather. When Tom Baker, who played the Fourth Doctor, declined to appear in the programme, Hurndall's role was expanded slightly to have the First Doctor take a greater part in the action. It was hoped Hurndall would reprise his portrayal of the First Doctor alongside the Doctor's granddaughter Susan Foreman, played by Carole Ann Ford, in the 22nd-season story The Two Doctors, but Hurndall's death saw the storyline adjusted to feature the Second Doctor played by Patrick Troughton and Jamie McCrimmon played by Frazer Hines.

=== Films ===
His films included Joanna (1968), Hostile Witness (1968), Some Girls Do (1969), Zeppelin (1971), I, Monster (1971), Lady Caroline Lamb (1972), Royal Flash (1975) and Crossed Swords (1977).

== Death ==
In April 1984, Hurndall died of a heart attack at the age of 73 in London, less than five months after the first broadcast of "The Five Doctors". Many sources, including Elisabeth Sladen's autobiography, state that he died before being paid for the role. However, Doctor Who Magazine writer Richard Bignell claims that this is not true, saying "Hurndall had five different payments made out to him ... (four contractual, one expenses) and all were paid in 1982 and 1983, way before his death."

== Filmography ==
Year	Title	Role	Notes
1967	Deadlier Than the Male	Suited Man at Judo Club	Uncredited
1968	Joanna	Butler	Uncredited
1968	City '68	Sir Alan Dix-Perkin	3 episodes
1968	Hostile Witness	Supt. Eley	
1968	The Avengers	Farrer	Episode: Legacy of Death
1969	Some Girls Do	President of Aircraft Co.	
1970	Steptoe and Son	Timothy Stanhope	Episode: Any Old Iron?
1971	Zeppelin	Blinker Hall	
1971	I, Monster	Lanyon	
1971	The Rivals of Sherlock Holmes	Lord Faber	Episode: The Ripening Rubies
1972	His and Hers	Editor	3 episodes
1972	Lady Caroline Lamb	Radical	
1972–1973	War and Peace	Count Rostopchin	3 episodes
1972–1977	Van der Valk	Picard/Magistrate	2 episodes
1973	Gawain and the Green Knight	Bearded Man	
1973	Hadleigh	Sir George Osborne	Episode: "Gentlemen and Players"
1974	The Brothers	Clifton	Episode: A Bad Mistake
1974	Father Brown	Father Superior	Episode: The Arrow of Heaven
1975	Royal Flash	Detchard	
1977	The Prince and the Pauper	Archbishop Cranmer	
1977	Just William	Great Uncle George	Episode: William's Worst Christmas
1981	Blake's 7	Nebrox	Episode: Assassin
1983	Blue Peter	First Doctor	
1983	Doctor Who	First Doctor	Episode: "The Five Doctors"

== See also ==
- This I Believe – 1957 second season on Radio Luxembourg
