= Sastreria Cornejo =

Sastreria Cornejo S.A. is a company that specialises in costumes for film, television and theater. It is a Spanish company headquartered in Madrid. It was founded in 1920 by Humberto Cornejo.

== Partial company filmography ==
- Altamira (2016)
- The Huntsman: Winter's War (2016)
- Knights of the Roundtable: King Arthur (2016)
- Ben-Hur (2016)
- Pride and Prejudice and Zombies (2016)
- The Danish Girl (2015)
- In the Heart of the Sea (2015)
- Macbeth (2015)
- Tale of Tales (2015)
- Tulip Fever (2015)
- Dracula Untold (2014)
- Exodus: Gods and Kings (2014)
- Into the Woods (2014)
- Maleficent (2014)
- Pompeii (2014)
- Liberador (2013)
- Los Miserables (2012)
- Insensibles (2012)
- El Ultimo Jinete (2012)
- Black Butterflies (2011)
- The Countess (2009)
- Casanova (2005)
- Stage Beauty (2004)
- The Merchant of Venice (2004)
- Callas Forever (2002)
- The Others (2001)
- Gladiator (2000)
- Goya in Bordeaux (1999)
- Shakespeare in Love (1998)
- Dragonheart (1996)
- Matador (1986)
- Sword of the Valiant (1984)
- Dune (1984)
- El crimen de Cuenca (1980)
- The Four Musketeers (1974)
- The Three Musketeers (1973)
- Nicholas and Alexandra (1971)
- Cromwell (1970)
- Doctor Zhivago (1967)
- Chimes at Midnight (1965)
- A Fistful of Dollars (1964)
- 55 Days at Peking (1963)
- Noches de Casablanca (1963)
- Lawrence of Arabia (1962)
- El Cid (1961)

== Television Projects ==
- Poldark (2015)
- Sons of Liberty (2015)
- Marco Polo (2014)
- Da Vinci's Demons (2013)
- Vikings (2013)
- Game of Thrones (2011)
- Downton Abbey (2010)
