= Gawain and the Green Knight (film) =

1973 British film

- French poster
- Directed by: Stephen Weeks
- Written by: Philip M. Breen; Stephen Weeks
- Based on: Sir Gawain and the Green Knight by: Anonymous
- Produced by: Carlo Ponti
- Starring: Murray Head; Nigel Green; Robert Hardy
- Cinematography: Ian Wilson
- Edited by: John Shirley
- Music by: Ron Goodwin
- Production company: Scancrest
- Distributed by: United Artists
- Release date: June 1973
- Running time: 93 minutes
- Country: United Kingdom
- Language: English

Gawain and the Green Knight is a 1973 British historical adventure film directed by Stephen Weeks, and starring Murray Head as Gawain and Nigel Green in his final theatrical film as the Green Knight. The story is based on the medieval English tale Sir Gawain and the Green Knight and also Yvain, the Knight of the Lion by Chrétien de Troyes and the tale of Sir Gareth in Thomas Malory's Le Morte d'Arthur.

Locations used included castles at Cardiff, Caerphilly and Castell Coch, Wales; Peckforton castle, Cheshire; and St Michael's Mount and Roche Rock, Cornwall. St. Govan's chapel on the Pembrokeshire coast was also featured.

Weeks remade the film in 1984 as Sword of the Valiant with Miles O'Keeffe and Sean Connery as Gawain and the Green Knight, respectively.

== Plot ==
The mysterious Green Knight appears before King Arthur's court in the New Year and demands the head of Sir Gawain as the prize in a bizarre game. Given a year's grace, Gawain sets off in search of the Knight for a rematch.

== Cast ==
- Murray Head as Gawain
- Ciaran Madden as Linet
- Nigel Green as Green Knight
- Anthony Sharp as King
- Robert Hardy as Sir Bertilak
- David Leland as Humphrey
- Murray Melvin as Seneschal
- Tony Steedman as Fortinbras
- Ronald Lacey as Oswald
- Willoughby Goddard as Knight
- George Merritt as Old Knight
- Pauline Letts as Lady of Lyonesse
- Richard Hurndall as Bearded Man
- Peter Copley as Pilgrim
- Geoffrey Bayldon as Wiseman
- Jack Woolgar as Porter

== Reception ==
It is rated 5.4/10 on IMDb.

== See also ==
- List of films based on Arthurian legend
