= Mike Raven =

English artist (1924–1997)

- Born: Austin Churton Fairman; 15 November 1924; London, England
- Died: 4 April 1997 (aged 72); Blisland, Cornwall, England
- Occupations: Radio personality, actor, sculptor, TV presenter, production manager, writer, sheep farmer, ballet dancer, flamenco guitarist, photographer
- Spouse(s): Aurelia Pascual y Pérez (1949–?); Mandy Kilbey (1971–1997)
- Children: 6
- Parent(s): Austin Fairman; Hilda Moore

Austin Churton Fairman (15 November 1924 – 4 April 1997), who used the name Churton Fairman but was more widely known under the pseudonym Mike Raven in the 1960s and early 1970s, was a British radio disc jockey, actor, sculptor, sheep farmer, writer, TV presenter and producer, ballet dancer, flamenco guitarist and photographer.

== Early life and career ==
Churton Fairman was born in London, the son of actors Austin Fairman (1892–1964) and Hilda Moore (c.1886–1929). His mother died in the United States when he was a child, after catching an infection from him, and he was brought up by three aunts, who sent him to Aldenham School. He went up to Magdalen College, Oxford, but was called up for wartime service in the Royal Ulster Rifles, where he served as a lieutenant. After the war he joined the Ballet Rambert as a dancer, but then turned to photography, specialising in ballet shots. He also worked as a conjuror and interior decorator.

In 1949, he married Aurelia Pascual y Pérez, a refugee from the Spanish Civil War, and returned with her to her home. They had one son and three daughters together; they later divorced. He wrote a well-regarded travel book, Another Spain, published in 1952, about Spain's undiscovered countryside and in particular Aurelia's home village of Quintanarraya.

While in Seville for the Holy Week celebrations there, he met the director Peter Brook. This led to him returning to London and becoming an actor, director and production manager on dramas on ITV. When ITV's Stars on Sunday religious series ended, he presented both the Ten Commandments programme and its successor, Songs That Matter, as well as contributing to ATV's weekday Epilogue. He also acted on stage in Moscow in the 1950s with John Gielgud, and occasionally played flamenco guitar music in a Spanish restaurant in London.

== Radio career ==
In the early 1960s, still using his real name, he began working for BBC radio, presenting talks and, occasionally, Woman's Hour. However, when his cousin, Liberal Party politician Oliver Smedley, founded the pirate radio station Radio Atlanta, he joined the station as a disc jockey, broadcasting from the ship Mi Amigo moored off the Essex coast near Frinton-on-Sea. At that point, he began using the name Mike Raven, and presented shows which focused on his love of American blues, rhythm and blues and soul music, of which he owned a large record collection. In 1964 he married Mandy Kilbey, sometimes presenting radio programmes jointly with her; they later had two sons.

With Smedley, he became an active campaigner lobbying Parliament for the legalisation of the pirate radio stations, until Smedley was accused of causing the death of rival radio entrepreneur Reg Calvert by shooting him with a shotgun; he was later acquitted on the grounds of self-defence. Raven then moved to another pirate station, Radio Invicta, which broadcast from a wartime defence tower on a sandbank in the mouth of the River Thames. The station was later known as Radio King and Radio 390. There, he was programme controller and presented a daily R&B show until November 1966.

A compilation album, The Mike Raven Blues Show, billed as "twice voted top pirate radio show", was issued on the Xtra label, a subsidiary of Transatlantic Records, in 1966. It featured recordings by Texas Alexander, Blind Lemon Jefferson, Gus Cannon, Robert Johnson, Speckled Red, Victoria Spivey, Lead Belly, Big Bill Broonzy, Sonny Boy Williamson, Brownie McGhee, Lightnin' Hopkins, and Elmore James.

After working for a short time for Radio Luxembourg, presenting an EMI-sponsored soul show, he joined BBC Radio 1 – the first national radio channel in the UK playing predominantly popular music – for its launch day in September 1967. The Mike Raven Blues Show debuted on the first day of Radio 1, and was a regular feature, usually on Sunday evenings, until November 1971, eventually expanding to a two-hour slot. Raven was regarded as a leading authority on the subject, and the show was highly influential in promoting the music of African American culture within the UK, being described as "essential listening for every self-respecting blues fan".

== Later life ==
In 1971 he decided to leave radio and to return to acting, combining his former career with his passion for the occult to work in horror movies. The pre-publicity for these films centred on Raven's interests in the occult – he reputedly always dressed in black, often with a matching cloak. He first appeared as Count Karnstein in the Hammer horror film Lust for a Vampire (1971) but suffered the indignity of having his voice re-dubbed. He then moved to the Amicus production company for I, Monster (1971), and worked with producer Tom Parkinson on Crucible of Terror, in which he played a mad sculptor. The filming introduced him to Cornwall, where he moved with his family to live in a converted 17th-century pigsty at Penpol, Lesnewth. Raven and Parkinson collaborated again on Disciple of Death (1972), which Raven partly financed. However, its poor commercial performance effectively ended his acting career – one critic described the film as "so incoherent that it comes across as a Dada nightmare". He also appeared on the television music show 2 G's and the Pop People (1972), performing a version of "Monster Mash".

He reverted to using his real name in 1974, and began to produce carvings in wood and granite, combining religious and erotic imagery. In 1977 he moved with his family to South Penquite, near Blisland on Bodmin Moor, where, with no prior knowledge, he began sheep farming, eventually establishing a successful farm. Later, he had to give up farming because of a heart condition, turning instead to his art. He determined not to sell any work until he had enough for an exhibition, but was initially thwarted by the unexpected deaths of two of his sponsors, the critic Peter Fuller and then the artist Christina Hoare. His first show of sculptures was eventually arranged in Cornwall, but shortly before it was due to open the sponsors pulled out on the grounds that some of the works were in bad taste. They were eventually, and successfully, displayed in the crypt of St George's Church, Bloomsbury, in 1990, and later at the Penzance Gallery. One of his pieces, The Deposition from the Cross, was later exhibited in the Images of Christ exhibition of 20th-century religious art staged at Northampton and St Paul's Cathedral, London. A series of commissions followed, from around Europe.

On the 25th anniversary of the start of Radio 1, in 1992, it was at first rumoured that he was dead, and someone making personal appearances as Mike Raven was exposed as a fraud. Eventually an appeal for information about him was heard by a butcher in Cornwall, who revealed Fairman's change of name and whereabouts.

He wrote of himself:

Now, looking back from the comparative serenity of old age, I can see that my whole life has been conditioned by two main elements; my consistently unsuccessful struggle to come to terms with my own sexuality, and my, consequently, equally unsuccessful attempts to live up to my Christian beliefs...

== Death ==
Fairman died in 1997, and was buried in a grave he had dug for himself on Bodmin Moor.

== Filmography ==
- Lust for a Vampire (1971)
- I, Monster (1971)
- Crucible of Terror (1971)
- Disciple of Death (1972)
