= Vectis postal service =

The Vectis postal service was a postal service set up during the national postal strike of the United Kingdom in 1971. This was amongst a number of local delivery services which flourished during the strike. The service was set up by a group of Ryde business men, led by R. W. Cawdell, C.C., who acted as head postmaster for the service. It covered an area encompassing the whole of the Isle of Wight. At peak the service handled over 1500 items of mail daily.

The national postal strike ended on 8 March 1971, and with it the local service.

== Stamps ==
An initial set of stamps with a face value of 5p or 1/- in white and blue were issued imperforate on 22 January and sheets of 48 on 23 January. A First Day Cover was also issued on the same day. A further printing in green was issued on 16 February 1971. During the time the service was in operation decimal currency was introduced across the UK on 15 February.
