= I, Monster =

1971 British horror film by Stephen Weeks

- Theatrical release poster
- Directed by: Stephen Weeks
- Written by: Milton Subotsky
- Based on: Strange Case of Dr. Jekyll and Mr. Hyde by Robert Louis Stevenson
- Produced by: John Dark; Max Rosenberg; Milton Subotsky
- Starring: Christopher Lee; Peter Cushing; Mike Raven; Richard Hurndall; George Merritt; Kenneth J. Warren
- Cinematography: Moray Grant
- Edited by: Peter Tanner
- Music by: Carl Davis
- Distributed by: British Lion Films
- Release date: November 1971 (U.K.)
- Running time: 75 minutes 81 minutes (extended cut)
- Country: United Kingdom
- Language: English

I, Monster is a 1971 British horror film directed by Stephen Weeks (his feature debut) and starring Christopher Lee and Peter Cushing. It was written by Milton Subotsky, adapted from Robert Louis Stevenson's 1886 novella Strange Case of Dr. Jekyll and Mr. Hyde, with the main characters' names changed to Dr. Charles Marlowe and Mr. Edward Blake. It was produced by Amicus.

== Plot ==
Psychologist Charles Marlowe invents a drug which will release his patients' inhibitions. When he tests it on himself, he becomes the evil Edward Blake, who descends into crime and eventually murder. Utterson, Marlowe's lawyer, believes that Blake is blackmailing his friend until he discovers the truth.

== Cast ==
- Christopher Lee as Marlowe / Blake
- Peter Cushing as Utterson
- Mike Raven as Enfield
- Richard Hurndall as Lanyon
- George Merritt as Poole
- Kenneth J. Warren as Deane
- Susan Jameson as Diane
- Marjie Lawrence as Annie
- Aimée Delamain as landlady (as Aimee Delamain)
- Michael Des Barres as boy in alley

== Production ==
It was photographed by Moray Grant, with music by Carl Davis.

Peter Duffell, who had previously worked for Amicus, was offered the movie to direct, but turned it down. Financing came from British Lion and the NFFC.

It was intended to be shown in 3-D utilizing the Pulfrich effect, but the idea was abandoned upon release.

== Differences from the source material ==
Apart from changing the names for the character Henry Jekyll/Edward Hyde to Charles Marlowe/ Edward Blake, as well as changing the character to a Freudian psychotherapist instead of a doctor, the story is fairly faithful to the original novella. The character of Danvers Carew is eliminated, with Marlowe murdering a woman who scorned him and leaving his broken walking stick on her body, similar to Carew's murder in the novella. The final act is also changed. In the original novella, Utterson and Poole smash Jekyll's door to find the body of Hyde dead by suicide, after Jekyll has failed to keep Hyde in check. In the film, Blake goes to kill Utterson at his residence, and in the ensuing struggle Utterson kills Blake by pushing him down the stairs. Blake's face transforms into Marlowe's while Utterson and his maid stare in shock.

== Reception ==
=== Box office ===
The film performed poorly at the box office,

=== Critical ===
The Monthly Film Bulletin wrote: "Stephen Weeks, here directing his first feature, has worked hard to renew our insight into a plot which has been subjected to so many exotic variations over the years. And his Victorian settings, in contrast to Hammer's more fanciful approach, are full of bizarrely authentic bric-a-brac and accompanied by the heavy ticking of countless clocks. ... Unfortunately, despite its stylised direction and evocative trappings, I, Monster is dogged by an extremely repetitive script, and some of the performances (most noticeably from Mike Raven as Enfield) are highly stilted. Because of this and the lack of resources, the film never really has much hope of becoming anything more than a curious, stylistic exercise."

Leslie Halliwell said: "Interesting minor work."

The Radio Times Guide to Films gave the film 2/5 stars, writing: "Dr Jekyll and Mr Hyde become Dr Marlowe and Mr Blake in a vapid attempt to give a Freudian psychological interpretation to the oft-told tale. Christopher Lee is convincing as the doctor meddling with a dangerous formula, and the Victorian London atmosphere is well captured, but director Stephen Weeks's inexperience means that any complex themes are quickly abandoned, and the end result is flatter than you might expect."

Some reviews have praised the film for its faithful direction from the source material.

Drew Hunt of Chicago Reader listed it as one of Christopher Lee's five best roles.

== Sources ==
- Bryce, Allen (2000), Amicus: The Studio That Dripped Blood, Stray Cat Publishing Ltd, ISBN 978-0953326136
- Hallenbeck, Bruce G. (2015), The Amicus Anthology, Midnight Marquee Press, ISBN 978-1936168569
- Hunt, Drew (14 June 2015), Christopher Lee's five best performances, Chicago Reader
- Miller, Mark A.; Johnson, Tom (2009), The Christopher Lee Filmography: All Theatrical Releases, 1948–2003, McFarland & Company, ISBN 978-0786446919
