= Joe and the Gladiator =

1971 British children's tv series

- Written by: Anna Home
- Directed by: Anna Home
- Starring: Dennis Lingard
- Country of origin: United Kingdom
- Original language: English
- No. of series: 1
- No. of episodes: 3

Production
- Producer: Anna Home
- Cinematography: Alan Featherstone
- Editor: Geoffrey Botterill
- Running time: 25 minutes
- Production company: BBC

Original release
- Network: BBC1
- Release: 22 February – 8 March 1971

Joe and the Gladiator is a British children's television series that aired on BBC1 in 1971.

== Plot ==
Joe Darling is an apprentice on the Newcastle shipyards with many problems in his life. His parents are threatening to separate and he has to put up with bullying from his boss the daft banter of his friend, Willie Styles. One day, Joe befriends an old rag and bone man, Ted Prodhurst and his house Gladiator. When Ted passes away, he leaves Galdiator to Joe and while not being able to afford to, devotes his time to looking after the horse and earns the respect of the community. Joe manages to keep Gladiator safe for two months and then a solicitor informs Joe that these past two months have been a test set by Ted to see if he could really look after Gladiator. Now having passed is rewarded with £2,000 left to him from Ted.

== Cast ==
- Dennis Lingard as Joe Darling
- Ursula Smith as Mrs Darling
- Richard Steele as Mr Darling
- Ken Purvis as Willie Styles
- James Garbutt as Narrator/Ted Prodhurst
- Malcolm Terris as Harry Farthing
- Sheila Whitmill as Anna Billings
- Philip Brack as Mr Billings
- Adrian Brine as Mr Tellman

== Production ==
The series was shot on 16 mm film and on location around South Shields, Tyneside and Wallsend. Due to the series low budget, crew members had to double as costume and design and narration was used for scenes they couldn't afford to film.

== Episodes ==
| No. | Title | Original release date |
|---|---|---|
| 1 | "Taggerine Ted" | February 22, 1971 |
| 2 | "Gladiator in Danger" | March 1, 1971 |
| 3 | "The Letter" | March 8, 1971 |

== Availability ==
The series has never been released on home media but all episodes can be found on YouTube here.
