= Stephen Weeks =

British film director, writer and producer

Stephen Weeks is a British film director, writer, and producer. He started making films when was 16 and made his featured debut aged 22 with I, Monster.

== Select filmography ==
- I, Monster (1971)
- Gawain and the Green Knight (1973)
- Ghost Story (1974)
- Scars (1976)
- Sword of the Valiant (1983)
- The Bengal Lancers! (1984)
