= Where Do I Sit? =

- Presented by: Peter Cook
- Country of origin: United Kingdom
- No. of series: 1
- No. of episodes: 3

Production
- Producer: Ian MacNaughton

Original release
- Network: BBC2

Where Do I Sit? is a chat show hosted by the English comedian Peter Cook. It was broadcast on BBC 2 in February 1971. It was cancelled after three episodes. The series was produced by the comedy producer Ian MacNaughton.

== Production and cancellation ==
The show was commissioned by the BBC's Head of Comedy, Michael Mills. Cook was given carte blanche to develop any format for the programme that he wanted, and settled on a combination of celebrity interviews, comedy sketches and performing a pop song on each episode, despite being a poor singer. The show was broadcast live. In a later interview with Russell Harty, Cook told Harty that he had wanted to restore the "embarrassing element that there used to be on television, when sets fell over and people forgot their lines and things went wrong". Cook's biographer, William Cook, felt that Mills was intimidated by Peter Cook's celebrity and so acquiesced to his demands for the show. Mills did not insist on commissioning a pilot episode.

Cook did not prepare for any of the interviews on the show. Louis Barfe wrote that the show "proved that the perfect chat show guest...could be the world's worst chat-show host". The Head of Light Entertainment Bill Cotton had wanted to cancel the programme after the initial episode, but was faced with legal action from Cook. It transpired in a subsequent meeting that the budget for the series had already been spent by Cook. Cotton told Cook that "Money I can deal with. Bad shows are far more difficult". The viewership rose across the three episodes; Cook's biographer, Harry Thompson felt that the rising audience was indicative of the public "enjoy[ing] watching disaster unfold...or at least being appalled by it".

Cook later spoke of the stress of making the show and how he experienced a "gathering sense of panic, and futility and the knowledge that I couldn't do it". Cook's wife, Judy Huxtable, said that he was abusing prescription drugs and excessively drinking alcohol during the production of the show which exacerbated his problems.

The BBC's subsequent effort at a late night chat show, Parkinson, was hosted by Michael Parkinson and marked the start of Parkinson's long career as a chat show host.

Recordings of the show were subsequently wiped by the BBC. Audio recordings exist of two of the episodes; no visual recordings have survived.

Guests included the actor Kirk Douglas, the comedian Spike Milligan, and comedy writer Johnny Speight, and on the third show, performer Ned Sherrin and actress Julie Ege. In his interview with Douglas, instead of asking him "How are you?", Cook asked him "Who are you?" by accident.

The first episode featured the humorist S. J. Perelman as a guest; Perelman's responses to Cook's questions were recalled by Cook's wife to be "almost monosyllabic". Cook's other guest on the initial episode, the writer Auberon Waugh, regarded the show as an "unmitigated catastrophe". Cook performed an impression of the American singer Johnny Cash on the first episode which was regarded by comedian (and viewer) Willie Rushton as "the worst thing he ever did...no one knew if he was joking or not".

Cook telephoned a viewer live on air who had written in to the programme accusing him of being a drug addict. The man's wife answered, informing Cook that her husband was in the bath. When her husband finally got out of his bath and came to the telephone, he told Cook that he was "lost for words" and that he "can't linger now cos' I'm dripping wet. And I'd like to watch the rest of the show".

Sketches broadcast on the show featured Cook dressed in drag as Cilla Black asking motorists at a petrol station in Batley if they could recognise him, and his wife Judy walking across him as he lay over a stream to the accompaniment of Simon & Garfunkel's "Bridge over Troubled Water".

One sketch featuring Cook and Spike Milligan led to the campaigner Mary Whitehouse calling for the police to prosecute Cook for blasphemy. After the sketch had been shown, Cook asked the live television audience if they had been offended. One man indicated that he had been and Cook verbally attacked him live on air.

== Reception ==
A reviewer for the Daily Mail wrote that "I have the feeling that fame has gone to Cook's head and he feels his mighty presence is enough to rivet millions to the screen. He sits scriptless, jabbering mindlessly to baffled guests". Philip Purser reviewed the show for The Daily Telegraph and felt that when Cook interviewed comedy writer Johnny Speight, Cook's voice unconsciously started imitating Speight's Cockney accent leading Purser to conclude that he was "not sure" that Cook was "capable of being himself". Auberon Waugh described the show as "total rubbish". Chris Dunkley, reviewing the show for The Times, felt that it was "deeply embarrassing" and "a sad disappointment". Cook's biographer, William Cook, felt that Cook required the moderating influence of his comedy partner Dudley Moore, who would learn an established script and allow Cook to improvise with moderation.

In a reappraisal, Graham McCann said of the show: "...in some ways, it was simply ahead of its time. Making a live TV show seem really live, in all its messy unpredictability, was frowned upon at the time as being shamefully unprofessional; nowadays it's regarded as 'ground-breaking'...In more recent years it has been hailed (as if Cook's show never happened) as admirably daring, innovative and refreshing. In short, there was little wrong, and quite a lot right, about Peter Cook's ideas for modernising the talk show. There was just quite a lot wrong with their execution. He simply wasn't personally in the right frame of mind to realise them properly at the time."
