= The More We Are Together =

1971 British TV comedy series

- Genre: Comedy
- Written by: Robert Storey
- Directed by: Mike Bevan
- Country of origin: United Kingdom
- Original language: English
- No. of series: 1
- No. of episodes: 6

Production
- Running time: 30 minutes

Original release
- Network: ITV
- Release: 30 January – 6 March 1971

The More We Are Together is a British television comedy that aired in 1971 and was produced by Yorkshire Television. Cast included Betty Marsden, Victor Brooks, Avril Angers and Roy Barraclough. The series exists in the archives, despite the wiping of the era.

== Episodes ==
No.	Title	Directed by	Written by	Original release date
1	"The Lodger and the Pill"	Mike Bevan	Robert Storey	30 January 1971
2	"Baby Vanishes"	Mike Bevan	Robert Storey	6 February 1971
3	"I Love Little Pussy"	Mike Bevan	Robert Storey	13 February 1971
4	"Crumpet Voluntary"	Mike Bevan	Robert Storey	20 February 1971
5	"Two Singles to Paradise"	Mike Bevan	Robert Storey	27 February 1971
6	"Don't Invite Crime"	Mike Bevan	Robert Storey	6 March 1971
