= Quintanarraya =

- Town
- Flag

- Location in Spain
- Coordinates: 41.789°N 3.334°W
- Country: Spain
- Autonomous community: Castile and León
- Province: Burgos

Quintanarraya is a town in the province of Burgos in the autonomous community of Castilla y León, Spain. Located in the region of the Sierra de la Demanda, since 1979 the municipality of Huerta de Rey, whose head is 7 kilometres (4 mi) away.

Located near the ancient Roman city of Clunia, was possession of several monasteries, such as Santo Domingo de Silos, until he escaped with Philip IV of its jurisdiction. It is a place of passage of both the Camino del Cid and the Ruta de la Lana.

Mostly aging population, economic activity is focused on agriculture and livestock. Of all the celebrations that take place throughout the year, highlight the festivities of Saint Roch, in mid-August.
