= Mary Maude =

British film and television actress

- Occupation(s): Film actor Television actor

Mary Maude is a British film and television actress.

== Selected filmography ==
- The House That Screamed (1970) - Irene
- Granny Gets the Point (1971) - Sandra
- Crucible of Terror (1971) - Millie
- Man at the Top (1971) - Robin Ackerman
- La muerte incierta (1973) - Brenda
- Scorpio (1973) - Anne
- Double Exposure (1977) - Nicki
- The Four Feathers (1978 TV movie) - Mrs Feversham
- Terror (1978) - Lady Garrick

== Television appearances ==
- At Last The 1948 Show (1967) - Lady in bath
- The Freewheelers (1968 to 1973) - Terry Driver
- Special Branch (1973) - Clare
- The Bill (1989) - Belinda Webb
- Lovejoy (1991) - Annabel
- Bread (1991) - Lady Bowford (final television appearance)
