= Penpol, Lesnewth =

Country house in Lesnewth, Cornwall, England

Penpol
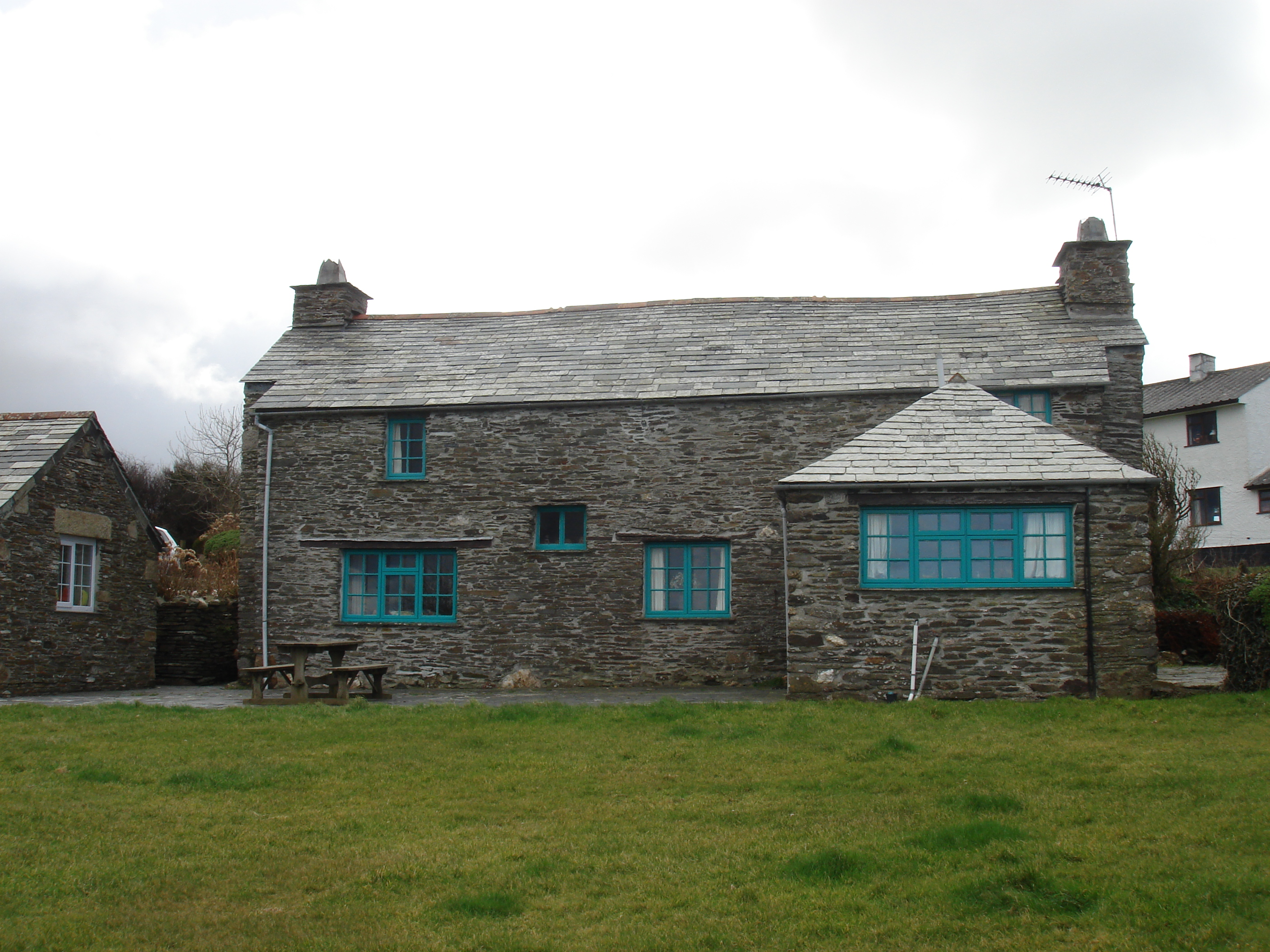

- Location within Cornwall
- 50.68121°N 4.64183°W
- Location: Lesnewth, Cornwall, England

Listed Building – Grade II
- Official name: Penpol
- Designated: 20 July 1987
- Reference no.: 1143449

Penpol is a Grade II listed building in north Cornwall, United Kingdom. It is situated two miles (3 km) east of Boscastle just outside the village of Lesnewth. The building dates from the early 17th century, originally just a two-room house. It served as a pig sty for a significant period before being converted back into a cottage by Mike Raven, a BBC Radio 1 DJ. Raven bought the property in 1973, bringing it up to date and building an extension on the side.

Penpol is a house built in the early 17th century, originally with just two rooms and a passage between them, probably a parlour and kitchen. It is largely build of granite rubble, with a slate roof. There is a 20th-century single story extension added to the house. The whole building was designated as a Grade II listed status on 20 July 1987.

== History ==
Penpol was once home to Churton Fairman, better known as Mike Raven a well-known radio DJ who presented on various pirate radio stations and on BBC Radio 1. In 1973, Penpol lay derelict and had been used as a pig-house for many years. Fairman bought the building and converted it into a functioning cottage for himself and his wife, Mandy. There he turned his hand to sculpture, creating stone and wood carvings until he moved in 1980.

== The house ==
Penpol is a Grade II listed cottage, having been added to the listed buildings register on 20 July 1987 as a "particularly unspoilt seventeenth century house". The property has been considerably altered over the years but was originally erected in the mid-seventeenth century. It is built from rubble stone and has a cement-washed slated roof with gable ends and projecting chimney-stacks on each end. The front of the house has three nearly symmetrical windows and there are signs that there was a porch at one time. All the windows on the front of the house date from the twentieth century, with only the main door frame still with a seventeenth century lintel. At the rear, there are two seventeenth century lintels for windows, but one has been blocked up. The house has two rooms with a passage between, each heated by a fireplace with a granite lintel. The wall to the left of the passage is substantial but the partition to the right has been removed and the rear door blocked up. The beams supporting the upper floor are slightly chamfered and roughly cut. The left room has a twentieth century extension at the back. The staircase is probably twentieth century but occupies the same position as the original staircase. The upper floor and attic were not available for inspection at the time of listing.
