= Primary immigration =

Primary immigration is a term which describes the movement of the earner of a family, or a young unattached single man, from one country to another, usually to improve their economic condition. Once the primary immigrant is established in the new country, they will often send for their family to come and join them (perhaps many years later), according to family reunification immigration laws. This is known as secondary immigration. Most countries tend to restrict the categories of people allowed to be primary immigrants, but allow the reunification of families of people already legally resident.

In the United Kingdom, the term has been used in the context of a single individual immigrating from another country, with secondary immigration referring to those wider family members who join a primary immigrant.

== See also ==
- Chain migration
