= Michael Latimer =

British film and television actor, writer, director, producer (1941–2011)

- Born: Michael James Latimer; 6 September 1941; Calcutta, British India
- Died: 25 June 2011 (aged 69); Clapham, London, England
- Occupations: Film and television actor; writer; director; producer

Michael James Latimer (6 September 1941 – 25 June 2011) was a British television stage and film actor, who later in his career turned to writing, directing, and producing.

== Early life ==
Latimer was born in Calcutta, where his father had a business, and was educated at the Leys School in Cambridge from 1955 to 1959, where he was a middle-distance runner and played rugby for the English Schoolboys Team. Upon leaving school, he trained at the Royal Academy of Dramatic Art (RADA) for two years, and on leaving began acting in cabaret revues. He stood in for Peter Cook in Beyond the Fringe when the original cast took the show to New York.

== Career ==
He appeared in various repertory and West End productions. His television appearances included The Avengers (1966–67), Sexton Blake (1968), Man at the Top (1972), Van der Valk (1972–73), in which he played Johnny Kroon alongside Barry Foster as Van der Valk, Special Branch (1973), Marked Personal (1973), Village Hall (1974), Crown Court (1974–76), The Sweeney (1975), Quiller (1975), The New Avengers (1977), Spectre (1977), Z-Cars (1978), The Professionals (1978), Maggie and Her (1979), Hammer House of Horror (1980) and Rumpole of the Bailey (1988).

His film roles include A Man for All Seasons (1966), Prehistoric Women (1967) opposite Martine Beswick, Mosquito Squadron (1969), Man of Violence (1969), Got It Made (1974) and Sweeney! (1977).

Latimer was the stage director for the first Johnny Nash and Bob Marley tours of the United Kingdom in 1972. He set up his own production company, Bedrock Productions; this had three top twenty hits in the German music charts for Hansa and Ariola Records.

He married the Australian artist Sheena Bancks, with whom he had a son (Rupert) and a daughter (Miranda), and moved with his wife to Sydney in 1980, where he took up directing and writing. He wrote and produced Ginger Meggs in 1982, a film based on the Australian comic strip written by his late father-in-law Jimmy Bancks. On his first visit to Australia in 1969, he directed Hamlet in Melbourne, a production that starred John Wood.

His writing for television included The Rovers (1970), the BBC play The Interview and also four episodes of Sons and Daughters (1983).

He taught at RADA, London Academy of Performing Arts (LAPA) and at drama school in Australia. As a director he worked on television commercials in Australia and directed some 37 theatre productions in the United Kingdom, including Daniel Magee's play Paddywack (1994) with James Nesbitt at the Cockpit Theatre in Marylebone.

== Personal life ==
A keen sportsman, Latimer was a member of the MCC and managed his own cricket team, the Bystanders.

After 42 years of marriage, his wife Sheena died; in his latter years his partner was Amanda Weldon.

== Death ==
Latimer died at Trinity Hospice in Clapham, London, in 2011, aged 69.

== Filmography ==
Year	Title	Role	Notes
1966	A Man for All Seasons	Norfolk's Aide	
1967	Prehistoric Women	David	
1969	Mosquito Squadron	Clark (Pilot)	Uncredited
1969	Man of Violence	Moon	
1974	Got It Made	David Tollemache	
1977	Sweeney!	P.P.S.	
1990	Fatal Sky	Beckwith	(final film role)
