= Man of Violence =

1970 British film by Pete Walker

- BFI DVD cover
- Directed by: Pete Walker
- Written by: Brian Comport; Pete Walker
- Produced by: Pete Walker
- Starring: Michael Latimer; Luan Peters; Derek Aylward
- Cinematography: Norman G. Langley
- Edited by: Peter Austen-Hunt
- Music by: Cyril Ornadel
- Distributed by: Miracle Films
- Release date: June 1970 (UK)
- Running time: 89 minutes
- Country: United Kingdom
- Language: English

Man of Violence, also known as Moon and The Sex Racketeers, is a 1970 British crime film produced and directed by Pete Walker and starring Michael Latimer, Virginia Wetherell, Luan Peters and Derek Aylward. It was written by Walker and Brian Comport.

== Plot ==
Unprincipled loan shark Moon is hired for industrial espionage by tycoon Sam Bryant, who also pays him to investigate protection racketeer Charles Grayson. At the same time, he is hired by Grayson to investigate Bryant's business dealings. Moon gets caught up in a stolen gold operation also involving Bryant and Grayson.

== Cast ==
- Michael Latimer as Moon
- Luan Peters as Angel
- Derek Aylward as Nixon
- Maurice Kaufmann as Charles Grayson
- Derek Francis as Sam Bryant
- Kenneth Hendel as Hunt
- George Belbin as Burgess
- Sydney Conabere as Alex Powell
- Erika Raffael as Goose
- Virginia Wetherell as Gale
- Steve Emerson as Steve
- Peter Thornton as Mike
- Michael Balfour as cafe owner
- John Keston as Girling
- Jessica Spencer as Joyce
- The Wishful Thinking as themselves

== Production ==
The film was shot on location in England and Tunisia.

== Critical reception ==
Monthly Film Bulletin wrote: "Abysmal espionage melodrama, spiced with sex episodes and outbursts of violence, with an overly intricate plot which is, perhaps fortunately, impossible to follow. The general level of the acting matches the inanity of the script."

== Home media ==
The BFI have released Man of Violence on DVD and Blu-ray through its Flipside strand, together with Walker's 1968 film The Big Switch. The sleeve notes state: "Pete Walker's affectionate low-budget homage to the gangster thriller is packed with sights and sounds from a Britain about to swing out of the Sixties and into a somewhat less optimistic decade. Man of Violence offers not only rare glimpses of a world gone by but also some twists on generic convention."
