= Wansho Laundry =

Taiwanese laundry shop

- Company type: Privately held company
- Industry: Laundry
- Founded: 1951 in Houli District, Taiwan
- Founder: Chang Wan-ji
- Headquarters: Taichung City, Taiwan
- Owner: Chang Wan-ji; Hsu Sho-er

Wansho Laundry (Chinese: 萬秀的洗衣店; pinyin: Wànxiù de xǐyīdiàn), also known as Want Show As Young, is a Taiwanese laundry shop founded in 1950 and owned by Chang Wan-ji (born 1937) and Hsu Sho-er (born 1936). The shop, in the district of Houli, has been the subject of widespread media coverage after pictures of its owners wearing abandoned clothing pieces as fashion outfits went viral on Instagram. Wan-ji and Sho-er's grandson, Reef Chang, manages marketing and styles the outfits, and originally came up with the idea following the COVID-19 lockdowns in China. As of February 2023, the shop's Instagram account has 730,000 followers.

== History ==
Wan-ji founded the shop in 1951 at the age of 14, having done dry cleaning and laundry for neighbors. He did not attend high school due to financial restrictions.

Wan-ji and Sho-er, both born in Taiwan, met each other in the late 1950s, when Sho-er's sister and aunt approached Wan-ji in the Houli District of Taichung City with the purpose of matchmaking. The two wed in 1959 and had two sons and two daughters, who have five grandsons and one granddaughter collectively. The couple worked together at the Wansho Laundry, renaming the shop to combine their names.

In the 1980s, following the martial law in Taiwan, the couple began traveling and visited Australia, the United States, Japan, and various countries in Europe.

In July 2020, Wan-ji and Sho-er's grandson Reef Chang began posting images of the couple wearing unclaimed clothes on Instagram under the handle @wantshowasyoung. On July 21, with 18 posts at the time, the page attained 50,000 Instagram followers, beginning to receive media attention, and reached 100,000 three days later. On July 27, the page had accumulated nearly 500,000 followers.

== Reception ==
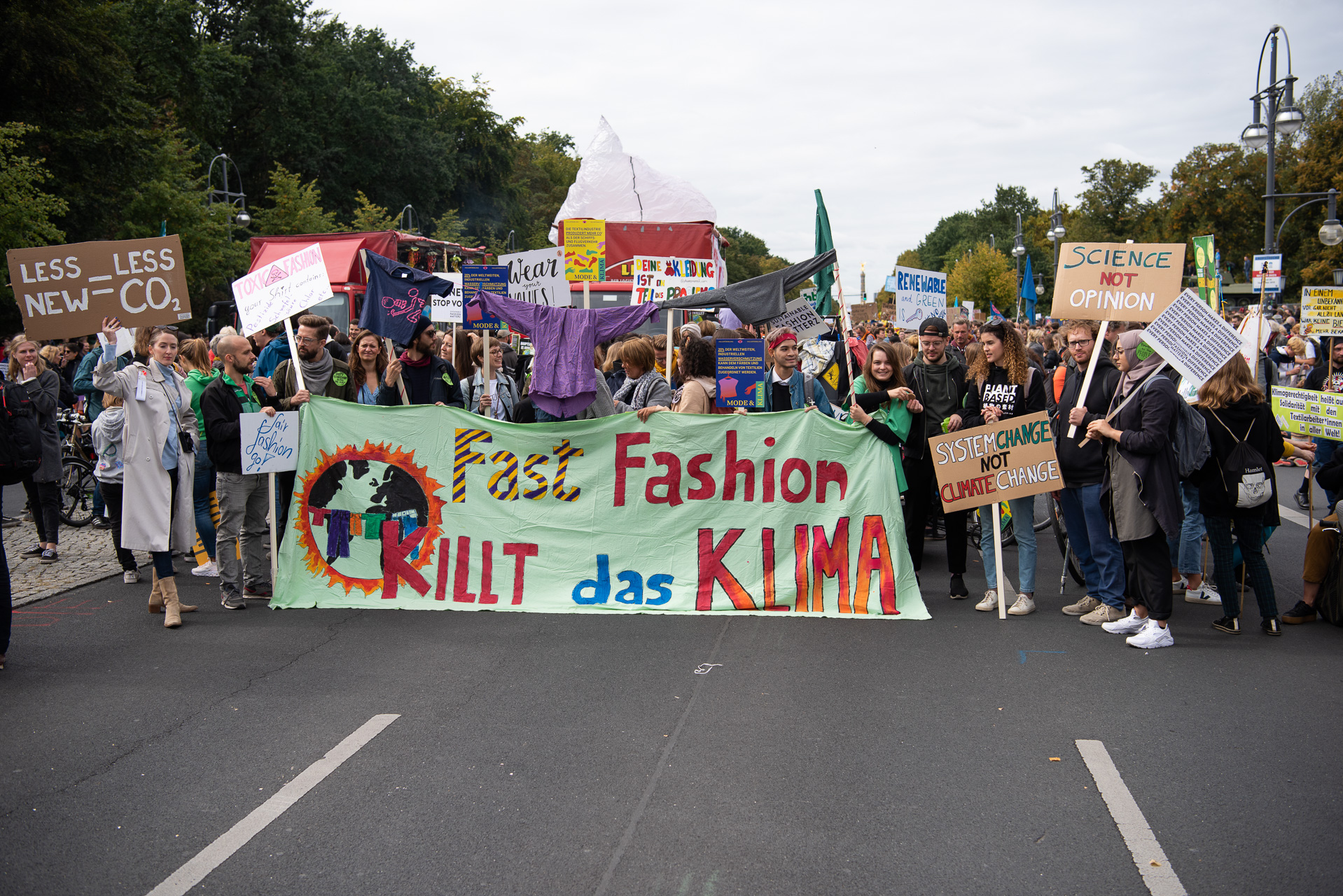
A fast fashion protest, which advocates for the use of second-hand clothing.

Wan-ji and Sho-er model vintage clothing, including blazers, skirts, and Chuck Taylor All-Stars, and have been described as "eclectic, funky and fun" by the New York Times. Vogue writes that Wansho Laundry's popularity "highlights the importance of sustainability in fashion and buying secondhand clothes," instead of "following 'fast fashion'" as Reef Chang describes.
