= Sorry! (TV series) =

British TV sitcom (1981–1988)

- Title card
- Genre: Sitcom; Black comedy
- Created by: Ian Davidson; Peter Vincent
- Directed by: David Askey
- Starring: Ronnie Corbett; Barbara Lott; William Moore; Marguerite Hardiman; Derek Fuke; Roy Holder
- Country of origin: United Kingdom
- Original language: English
- No. of series: 7
- No. of episodes: 42 + 1 short

Production
- Producer: David Askey
- Running time: 30 minutes

Original release
- Network: BBC1
- Release: 12 March 1981 – 10 October 1988

Sorry! is a BBC television sitcom that aired on BBC1 from 12 March 1981 to 10 October 1988. It starred Ronnie Corbett and was created and written by Ian Davidson and Peter Vincent, both of whom had previously written for Corbett on The Two Ronnies.

The theme music was composed by Gaynor Colbourn and Hugh Wisdom, arranged by Gaynor Colbourn and conducted by Ronnie Hazlehurst.

== Plot ==
Sorry! is centred on Timothy Lumsden who, 41 years old in the first three series (his age increased to 42 and then 48 in subsequent series - Corbett was actually 50-57 during the series' run), is a librarian who still lives at home with his domineering mother Phyllis and henpecked father Sidney. Although quite shy around women, Timothy longs to find love and leave home, but Phyllis is always against the idea and constantly manipulates her son into staying at home. One of the catchphrases of the series is Sidney's "Language, Timothy!", typically said in response to something that has been misunderstood as inappropriate or offensive. Timothy usually responds "Sorry, Father", but sometimes snaps "Shut up, Father!", to which Sidney replies "fair enough".

Timothy's friend Frank and sister Muriel urge Timothy to stand up to his mother once and for all. Muriel had successfully left home and married Kevin, and so is viewed with distrust by her mother.

== Cast ==
- Ronnie Corbett as Timothy Lumsden, a middle-aged man still living with his parents and who longs to move out
- Barbara Lott as Phyllis Lumsden, Timothy and Muriel's selfish, overbearing mother
- William Moore as Sidney Lumsden, Timothy and Muriel's eccentric father who is often himself bullied by Phyllis
- Marguerite Hardiman as Muriel, Timothy's more assertive younger sister
- Derek Fuke as Kevin, Muriel's husband
- Roy Holder as Frank Baker, Timothy's best friend who urges Timothy to stand up to his mother
- Wendy Allnutt as Annette (series 1 ep. 1), and Jennifer (series 6)
- Bridget Brice as Pippa, Timothy's girlfriend and later domestic partner (series 7)
- Jennie Franks as Jean, the barmaid
- Mavis Pugh as Mrs. Barrable, Phyllis's close friend who sometimes aids her in her schemes to sabotage Timothy's social life
- Sheila Fearn as Freddie
- John Leeson as Victor
- Michael Redfern as Denny
- Teddy Green as Denzil

== Episodes ==
Series 1 (1981) Thursdays

Title	Airdate	Overview
"For Love or Mummy"	12 March 1981	Timothy Lumsden is a 41-year-old librarian whose mother won't let him cut the apron strings. He takes an attraction to Annette, a new member of his Amateur Dramatics Group, and is determined to take her to a dance aboard a river boat. After his mother puts all of his trousers in the wash, he has to wear a cat costume from a previous drama production to attend the dance.
"Buttons"	19 March 1981	Timothy, who has been cast as the rear end of a horse in the latest production of Cinderella, is smitten with Vanessa, a woman who is friends with his casting director, even if it does mean he has to fight one of his rivals, Tiny Heseltine, to win her.
"The Godfather"	26 March 1981	After a morning trying to get rid of some bin bags, Timothy gives his godson, Gavin, some guidance about bullying. Gavin tells him about Duggie Bullford, who is constantly bullying him. Timothy is determined to settle the matter with Duggie's father.
"Bachelor Seeks Anywhere"	2 April 1981	Timothy is interested in an advertisement for sharing a cheap flat with a couple of girls. Can he reply to the ad without Mother knowing and can he persuade a singing tramp to leave the library?
"Does Your Mother Know You're Out?"	9 April 1981	Timothy's mother, Phyllis, wants him to paint the understairs cupboard for the meter man's next visit. But he is more focused on winning a bet with his colleague, Victor, that he will see Gone with the Wind with the library assistant, Caroline.
"Curse of the Mummy"	16 April 1981	The Lumsdens get a visit from Timothy's sister Muriel, to whom their mother refuses to speak because she disapproves of Muriel's husband Kevin. Muriel prevails upon Timothy to leave home and come with her and, helped by Timothy's best friend Frank, they escape. However, Timothy's parents give chase and freedom seems very unlikely.

Series 2 (1982) Thursdays

Title	Airdate	Overview
"Cromer or Bust"	22 April 1982	Timothy has booked a second honeymoon for his mother and father in Cromer, so he can have a party while they're away. All is slowly going to plan until Father has an accident with a barrel of beer.
"Perchance to Dream"	29 April 1982	Timothy is preparing for a job interview but has a recurring dream that the interviewer is his old headmaster, who wants to cane him. He visits a psychotherapist who tells him not to worry but to enjoy the experience of the interview. Unfortunately he enjoys it rather too much with an overly laid back attitude. And those dreams still persist with Mother replacing the headmaster.
"Sons and Lovers"	6 May 1982	Timothy is not pleased when his cousin Brinsley, who bullied him as a child, comes to stay, especially as Mrs Lumsden gives him preferential treatment, banishing Timothy to the attic to give Brinsley his bedroom. In fact she even tells Timothy to move out though fortunately the constant fussing over him is too much for Brinsley, who makes his own decision, thus negating the need for Timothy to emigrate.
"Great Expectations"	13 May 1982	When rich Aunt Esme visits the family, Timothy and his father are so embarrassed by Mother's attempts to get Esme to leave her her money that they sneak off to the pub but prang the car in the process. A shifty garage owner mends it at cut price, thanks to Aunt Esme, but since Mrs. Lumsden has reported the car stolen, the police give chase and there is a second accident before Timothy learns who will benefit from the will (it's not the Lumsden family).
"The Next Best Man"	20 May 1982	Frank will marry Jennifer but has asked his friend Richard to be best man - to Timothy's annoyance. However, after Timothy has indirectly caused Richard to break a leg, he gets his request with Mrs. Lumsden inviting the happy couple to tea. Timothy decides to sabotage the occasion though ironically, he is the one who also ends up with a broken leg.
"Could Do Better"	27 May 1982	The night before Frank's wedding, Timothy meets and gets on extremely well with bridesmaid Liz, who also has a restrictive family life and is accident-prone like himself. The next day, Timothy has to come to her aid but, as best man, has to get the ring to the church on time, and almost fails to make it due to a succession of mishaps. On arrival, he encounters disappointment and a lucky escape both at the same time.

Series 3 (1982) Thursdays

Title	Airdate	Overview
"The Rabbit and the Pussycat"	28 October 1982	Timothy ends up becoming involved in a treasure hunt for a golden rabbit which is supposed to be buried somewhere close by.
"You're Going Nowhere"	4 November 1982	Muriel and Kevin invite Timothy and Freddie to stay the weekend with them to help their romance along. When Timothy's dreadful mother finds out, she pretends to be dying to coax Timothy back home.
"Bottom of the Class"	11 November 1982	Timothy is promoted from prompter to Bottom in the local dramatic society production of A Midsummer Night's Dream.
"Spellbound"	18 November 1982	When the mobile library breaks down in the country, Timothy takes shelter from the rain in a barn where three elderly women tell his fortune.
"It Never Rained in Those Days"	25 November 1982	Mother's birthday is coming up again and it's time for the rest of the family to pay some suitable homage. Meanwhile, Timothy is obsessed with the fair Jean from Acacia Avenue but is too cowardly to approach her.
"The Big Sleep"	2 December 1982	After an accident at the tennis club, Timothy is taken to hospital where he wrongly believes that he is terminally ill.

Christmas sketch (1982) Monday

Title	Airdate	Overview
The Funny Side of Christmas	27 December 1982	Sketch (6 minutes)

Series 4 (1985) Sundays

Title	Airdate	Overview
"My Huckleberry Friend"	28 April 1985	After Mrs. Lumsden complains that burglars seem to find her house too lowly to rob, Timothy meets Sharon, a young runaway living in a squat.
"Move Over Mrs Lumsden"	5 May 1985	Mother is aiming to be the Ladies' Luncheon Club chairperson and invites the influential Aurelia for dinner on the same night that Timothy is having a pianola delivered before going on a date - inevitably ruined by his mother. Muriel decides Father should live with her and Kevin.
"One of Our Naughty Bits Is Missing"	12 May 1985	Timothy tries to supply an adult book to the men's ward at the local hospital but chaos ensues.
"Confessions of a Jobbing Gardener"	19 May 1985	Timothy's mother is worried that his father is getting up to no good with a local widow.
"A Little Something Set Aside"	26 May 1985	Timothy's mother finds out that he has a modest sum of money in his savings account
"Collapse of Small Party"	2 June 1985	After his parents are invited to attend the Chartered Accountants' Ball, Timothy decides to throw a party whilst they are out.

Series 5 (1986) Saturdays

Title	Airdate	Overview
"The Primal Scene, So to Speak"	10 May 1986	Timothy accidentally finds out about an affair that a local businessman is having who ends up offering him a large amount of money and a book contract to keep his mouth shut.
"Every Clown Wants to Play Hamlet"	17 May 1986	Timothy has the role of prompter for the local amateur dramatic society's production of Hamlet, and he has his eye on the woman playing Ophelia.
"Bells for Uncle Barstable"	24 May 1986	There might be church bells ringing for Timothy and his piano teacher, Miss Clanger.
"Natural Wastage"	7 June 1986	Timothy is determined to prove that he can still be as lively as a kitten.
"My Family and Other Monsters"	14 June 1986	Timothy is challenged by his new girlfriend, barge-dwelling Fenella, to leave home and come away with her. First, he has to attend a family christening, to which he has accidentally brought a duck.
"It's a Wonderful Life, Basically"	21 June 1986	When Timothy wishes he had never been born, a Fairy Godmother makes his wish come true.

Series 6 (1987) Mondays

Title	Airdate	Overview
"A Chief Inspector Calls"	1 June 1987	Wuzzo, a convict Timothy has met on the prison library run, escapes and asks Timothy to bring his girlfriend Cilla to meet him - in the Lumsdens' shed.
"Dream Time"	8 June 1987	Timothy is rehearsing for Private Lives, but is looking forward to his parents going to visit an uncle in Australia, which means that he can have time alone with the desirable Jennifer Blenkinsop.
"Amaze Your Friends!"	15 June 1987	Timothy attends a weekend self-assertiveness course but his mother suspects that he is staying with Jennifer and makes a fool of herself by going to Jennifer's house to accuse her. On his return, Timothy decides to put his new found confidence into effect, with surprising results.
"Gone, But Not Forgotten"	22 June 1987	Phyllis appears to have died in mysterious circumstances, but is there more to it, when Timothy will only inherit the entire estate if he doesn't marry for 30 years?
"Little Foxes"	29 June 1987	Timothy rescues an injured fox from the local hunt and after taking it to the vet, releases it back into the countryside. He manages to see through his mother's ridiculous lie that he and Jennifer are actually brother and sister.
"Do You Take This Man – And His Mother?"	6 July 1987	Every single detail has been arranged on Timothy's wedding day so nothing can go wrong.

Series 7 (1988) Mondays

Title	Airdate	Overview
"Mothers and Brothers"	5 September 1988	Muriel attempts to persuade Timothy that the only way to escape their mother's clutches is for him to buy his own home.
"Every Day, In Every Way"	12 September 1988	Timothy is given a lucky charm but he realizes in very little time that its powers in shaping his destiny are nothing compared to those of his mother.
"A Fool and his Money"	19 September 1988	Timothy is tricked after he runs into an old friend
"Flying Lessons"	26 September 1988	Timothy makes a date with the girl of his dreams but Mother finds a way to blackmail him into not showing up for their date.
"Winter's Tales"	3 October 1988	Mother makes one last attempt to clip his wings as Timothy stands on the verge of finally gaining his freedom.
"Up, Up and Away?"	10 October 1988	Timothy finally escapes his mother's clutches and leaves home to live with his partner Pippa.

== DVD releases ==
The first two series of Sorry! were released on DVD under Playback Entertainment (Region 2, UK) in 2004. The DVD was put out of print in 2006, but the first series was re-released on DVD in 2007 under 2entertain & BBC Worldwide. It includes three audio commentaries by Ronnie Corbett. The second series was re-released in March 2008. The third, fourth, fifth and sixth series were released (for the very first time) on 2 August 2010 and 21 February 20 June and 26 September 2011. The seventh (and final) series was released on 4 June 2012 along with the complete set of 7 DVDs.

In region 4, the first four series have been released.

DVD title	No. of discs	Year	No. of episodes	DVD release	
DVD title	No. of discs	Year	No. of episodes	Region 2	Region 4
Complete Series 1	1	1981	6	2 July 2007	12 September 2007
Complete Series 2	1	1982	6	17 March 2008	19 March 2008
Complete Series 3	1	1982	6	2 August 2010	8 October 2008
Complete Series 4	1	1985	6	21 February 2011	2 February 2011
Complete Series 5	1	1986	6	20 June 2011	2011
Complete Series 6	1	1987	6	26 September 2011	201?
Complete Series 7	1	1988	6	4 June 2012	201?
Complete Series 1 – 7	7	1981–1988	42	4 June 2012	TBA
