= Virginia Wetherell =

English actress (born 1943)

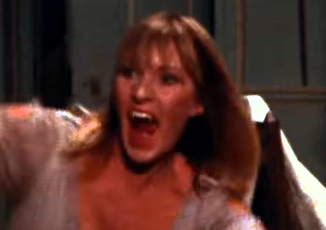
- Wetherell as a Bride of Dracula in Bram Stoker's Dracula (1974)
- Born: 9 May 1943 (age 83); Farnham, Surrey; England
- Occupation: Actress
- Years active: 1963–1998
- Spouse: Ralph Bates (m. 1973; died 1991)

Virginia Wetherell (born 9 May 1943), also known as Virginia Bates, is an English actress and vintage clothing expert. As an actress she is known for her roles in Hammer horror films. She has acted in films and television programmes from the 1960s to the 1990s; her peak period as an actress was the '60s and early '70s. From 1971 onwards she had a career owning and running a successful vintage clothing store, Virginia, in Holland Park in London. She has been described as 'the doyenne of London fashion' by The Times.

== Acting career ==
Wetherell's film appearances include The Big Switch (1968), Curse of the Crimson Altar (1968), Sleep Is Lovely (1968), Man of Violence (1969), Stanley Kubrick's A Clockwork Orange (1971), Dr. Jekyll and Sister Hyde (1971) and Demons of the Mind (1972), Disciple of Death (1972) and the TV film Dracula (1974).

On television, she was a regular cast member in The Troubleshooters as Julie Serres, and played Dyoni in the Doctor Who serial The Daleks.

== Vintage fashion career ==
Wetherell ran a vintage clothing shop, Virginia, at 98 Portland Road in Holland Park for 42 years, from 1971 to 2013. Her shop attracted customers from the fashion, film and theatrical industries: visitors to the shop and customers included singers Barbra Streisand and Madonna, actors such as Nicole Kidman, models such as Helena Christensen, Naomi Campbell, Kate Moss and Susie Cave, and fashion designers such as John Galliano, Donatella Versace, Donna Karan, Ralph Lauren and Alberta Ferretti, who took inspiration from her vintage clothes. Virginia was also a source of rare vintage clothing for museum curators.

Wetherell was named the "54th most important person in fashion" in an early 2000s industry poll, placed above such names as Stella McCartney, Vivienne Westwood and Ozwald Boateng. She has been described as 'the doyenne of London fashion' by The Times.

Wetherell was interviewed, as Virginia Bates, about the shop and vintage clothing in ITV4's television presentation of the 2024 Goodwood Revival, broadcast on 18 September 2024.

=== Fashion writing ===
As Virginia Bates, Wetherell wrote a fashion blog for British Vogue.

== Personal life ==
Wetherell was married to actor Ralph Bates from 1973 until his death from pancreatic cancer in 1991. They had two children. Wetherell is a trustee of the Ralph Bates Pancreatic Cancer Research Fund.

In December 2018 Wetherell was attacked in Paris during the riots.

== Filmography ==
=== Film ===
Year	Title	Role	Notes
1963	The Partner	Karen	
1963	Ricochet	Brenda	
1963	That Kind of Girl	Virginia (Eva's friend in nightclub)	Uncredited
1963	West 11	Unknown	Uncredited
1966	Alfie	Girl on park bench	Uncredited
1968	The Big Switch	Karen	
1968	Sleep Is Lovely	Girl at Airport	
1968	Curse of the Crimson Altar	Eve	
1969	Man of Violence	Gale	
1971	Dr Jekyll & Sister Hyde	Betsy	
1971	A Clockwork Orange	Stage Actress	
1972	Demons of the Mind	Inge	
1972	Disciple of Death	Ruth	
1998	Love Is the Devil	Person in the Colony Room Club	

=== Television ===
Year	Title	Role	Episode(s)
1964	Doctor Who	Dyoni	Season 1: (5 episodes)
1964	Detective	Susan Carmichael	Season 1, episode 10: "Subject: Murder"
1964	No Hiding Place	Selma	Season 6, episode 16: "The Carrion Bird"
1964	Crossroads	Heather Gurney	Unknown
1966	The Man in Room 17	Martita	Season 2, episode 1: "How to Rob a Bank and Get Away with it"
1967	The Troubleshooters	Julie Serres	Season 3: (9 episodes)
1967	Solarnauts	Unknown	TV Short
1968	Mr. Rose	Catherine	Season 3, episode 1: "The Less Than Iron Duke"
1971	Paul Temple	Francoise	Season 3, episode 8: "Has Anybody Here Seen Kelly?"
1971	Play for Today	Christine	Season 2, episode 5: " Thank You Very Much"
1974	Dracula	Dracula's Wife	TV movie
1974	The Protectors	Nurse	Season 2, episode 20: "Route 27"
1976	Barney's Last Battle	Young Woman	TV movie
1983	The Gentle Touch	Elaine Decker	Season 4, episode 14: "Who's Afraid of Josie Tate"
1985	Minder	Debbie Moore	Season 6, episode 7: "Minder on the Orient Express"
2001	Once Upon a Time In Europe	Herself	TV documentary
2024	Goodwood Revival	Herself	TV documentary
