= The Last Italian Tango =

- Directed by: Nando Cicero
- Written by: Mario Mariani; Nando Cicero; Marino Onorato
- Produced by: Mario Mariani
- Starring: Franco Franchi; Martine Beswick
- Cinematography: Luciano Trasatti
- Edited by: Alessandro Peticca
- Music by: Ubaldo Continiello; Franco Franchi
- Distributed by: Variety Distribution
- Release date: 1973
- Running time: 100 minutes
- Country: Italy
- Language: Italian

The Last Italian Tango (Italian: Ultimo tango a Zagarol, lit. 'Last Tango in Zagarol') is a 1973 Italian comedy directed by Nando Cicero. A parody of Last Tango in Paris, it is set in the town of Zagarolo near Rome.

Franco is trapped in a controlling marriage: his wife dominates him and secretly carries on with a lover hidden in the attic. Frustrated, Franco begins an affair with a mysterious young woman drawn to erotic games. When his wife discovers the affair, chaos and comic turmoil ensue.

== Plot ==
Franco is fed up with his wife Margherita, who keeps him on a strict diet, cheats on him with her lover living in the attic, and treats him like a handyman-slave in her hourly hotel. Franco hauls heavy suitcases filled with erotic equipment and even clients hidden in musical instrument cases. He's on a diet from everything—even sex—since his wife refuses herself and won't let him eat, forcing him to make himself a buttered sandwich while dreaming of erotic encounters.

Fed up, he moves into an unfurnished apartment. There he meets a young woman who draws him into unusual erotic games, and they start a relationship that ultimately fails. In his free time, he acts in a surreal documentary. Franco wanders the streets of Rome wearing a camel coat and a permanently depressed expression. When his wife fakes her death just to make him come back, Franco imagines he's finally done “tightening the belt,” but he isn't: it's not him who treats the lover as an object, but rather the lover who imposes the power of a dominant woman over him.

== Cast ==
- Franco Franchi: Franco
- Martine Beswick: The girl
- Gina Rovere: Margherita
- Franca Valeri: Director
- Nicola Arigliano: Marcello
- Ugo Fangareggi: Operatore
- Nerina Montagnani: Addetta alla toilette

== Production ==
Despite its title, the film was not shot in Zagarolo but in Rome. The reference to the town appears near the end, during the extended dance competition scene titled Coppa Zagarol.

The rented apartment, described as a "rat's nest" by the doorman, is actually on the top floor of the prestigious Palazzo del Ragno in the Coppedè district.

== Reception ==
The film was commercially successful, grossing around 950 million lire. It ranked 71st among the top 100 highest-grossing Italian films of the 1973–1974 season.

Film critic Robert Firsching wrote: "The humor is primarily of the cheap bathroom variety, as subtlety has never been director Nando Cicero's strong point, but there are some genuine laughs for the tolerant."
