= Second Chance (1981 TV series) =

British TV series (1981)

- Written by: Adele Rose
- Directed by: Gerry Mill; Richard Handford
- Starring: Susannah York; Ralph Bates
- Composer: Steve Hackett
- Country of origin: United Kingdom
- Original language: English
- No. of series: 1
- No. of episodes: 6

Production
- Executive producer: David Cunliffe
- Producer: Keith Richardson
- Running time: 60 mins

Original release
- Release: 23 January – 27 February 1981

Second Chance is a British television drama series starring Susannah York and Ralph Bates as a divorced couple. It was written by Adele Rose and debuted on 23 January 1981. Filming began in July 1980 with the series originally planned for a airing later that year.

== Synopsis ==
After 18 years of marriage Kate and Chris have divorced, with Kate leaving with their children, Jill (17) and Martin (15).

== Cast ==
- Susannah York as Kate Hurst
- Ralph Bates as Chris Hurst
- Kate Dorning as Jill Hurst
- Mark Eadie as Martin Hurst
- Steven Grives as Trevor Fuller
- Michael Culver as Richard Seymour
- Jan Harvey as Frances Sterling
- Carole Nimmons as Pat Thorne
- Andy Abrahams as Gordon Frost
- Gwen Cherrell as Bunty Gilpin

== Reception ==
Jennifer Selway's capsule review in The Observer said "It's good to see Susannah York appearing in a major television role but the lightweight script just isn't good enough." Clive James, also in the Observer said "Second Chance (Yorkshire) reached its final episode in much better shape than when it started."
