= The Vessel (web series) =

- Genre: Comedy
- Created by: Chloe Seddon, Phillip Whiteman
- Starring: Giovanni Bienne; Phillip Whiteman; Lily Brown
- Composer: James Jones
- Country of origin: United Kingdom
- Original language: English
- No. of seasons: 1
- No. of episodes: 10

Production
- Producers: Chloe Seddon; Phillip Whiteman
- Production locations: London, United Kingdom
- Running time: 5 - 10 minutes

Original release
- Network: YouTube; Blip
- Release: 21 October – 23 December 2012

The Vessel is a British comedy web series created and written by Chloe Seddon, Phillip Whiteman and Giovanni Bienne. The series is broadcast on the Internet and premiered on 21 October 2012. Currently 10 episodes have been made and the show can be found distributed across the web on platforms including Blip and YouTube. The Vessel Series follows Kim (Lily Brown) and her two best friends, Rory (Giovanni Bienne) and Mike (Phillip Whiteman), as they start a family. Rory and Mike are a gay couple who have decided they want to have a baby. Rory and Mike want a baby, so they ask their close friend Kim to be the surrogate mother.

== History ==
In an interview with the creators, Chloe Seddon and Phillip Whiteman stated that the idea came from when they were asked to improvise an audition. 'We chose the scenario of a gay couple asking their best friend to be the surrogate.'

In 2011, The Vessel Series was awarded 'best webseries pilot' at the London Raindance Film Festival. The Vessel Series has won awards including ‘Best Produced Comedy Web Series’ at LA Web Fest 2013. The series also picked up ‘Best Supporting Actor’ awards for Robin Soans and Louise Jameson.

== Plot ==
The Vessel Series deals with the controversial topics of LGBT parenting and surrogacy. It is filmed from the perspective of the surrogate mother (Kim), so the audience get to see the action through the surrogates eyes and never see Kim’s face or reactions, which is in a similar format to the series ‘Peep Show.’ Every Episode is shot as a single continuous take as well as the script being improvised.

=== Season 1 ===
Episode 1: A Mega Favour - Rory and Mike have a favour to ask Kim. Will she be their tummy mummy?
Episode 2: Not actual Turkeys - The trio visit a surrogacy consultant to find out the best way to get Kim pregnant.
Episode 3: A bit pregnant - Rory It's the big moment as Kim takes a pregnancy test, but is she truly ready for the result?
Episode 4: God didn't give either of them a womb - Kim's Mum The threesome invite Kim's parents over for dinner to break the news.
Episode 5: The Teacher's a Psychopath - Kim The boys' rigid pregnancy regime and Kim's fiery pregnancy hormones make a volatile combination when choosing baby names.
Episode 6: The Third dad - Kim It's Kim's third date with the hot guy Luke since she became pregnant and she has a special proposition for him.
Episode 7: Damn that's my ex...Tim - Rory While out for a walk in the park with Kim, Rory bumps into his ex-boyfriend.
Episode 8: Stretch Marks - A night full of uncomfortable dreams fuels a heart to heart between Mike and Kim as they share their anxieties about the baby.
Episode 9: Natural History Museum - A trip to the Natural History Museum causes an argument between the boys and a shock for them all.
Episode 10: It might feel like you're having a bit of a poo - Midwife The baby arrives bringing a new way of life for the boys and a life changing decision for Kim.
