= Prehistoric Women (1967 film) =

1967 film by Michael Carreras

- UK DVD cover
- Directed by: Michael Carreras
- Written by: Michael Carreras as "Henry Younger"
- Produced by: Michael Carreras
- Starring: Martine Beswick; Michael Latimer; Carol White; Steven Berkoff
- Cinematography: Michael Reed
- Edited by: Roy Hyde
- Music by: Carlo Martelli
- Production companies: Hammer Film Productions; Seven Arts
- Distributed by: Warner-Pathé Distributors
- Release dates: 25 January 1967 (US); 20 July 1968 (UK)
- Running time: 91 minutes (US); 74 minutes (UK)
- Country: United Kingdom
- Language: English
- Budget: £140,000

Prehistoric Women is a British fantasy adventure film directed by Michael Carreras, starring Martine Beswick and Michael Latimer. It was first released in the US in 1967, and released in the UK 18 months later under the title Slave Girls, where it was trimmed by 17 minutes and played as the supporting feature to The Devil Rides Out (1968).

== Plot ==
While on an Africa safari, British explorer David Marchant passes trees with a picture of a white rhino and shoots a leopard dead before a primitive tribe captures him. They accuse David of disturbing the spirit of the white rhinoceros and take him to their leader's temple. As the high priest makes his decision, David touches an ancient white rhino idol statue. A flash of lightning then opens a giant crack in a wall. David flees through it.

David enters a lush paradise jungle within a valley. He eventually encounters Saria, a terrified blonde woman. Dark-haired women eventually attack and capture them. As they reach the outskirts, David discovers another white rhino statue.

At the settlement, the blonde women serve the dark-haired women, whom the dark-haired Queen Kari rules. After refusing Kari's advances, David is thrown into a windowless cell with Saria. Saria says that Kari is protected by the Devils, the guardians shielding the people from the "cruel world outside". In return, a blonde woman must be taken as a thanksgiving for protection.

David is moved to where the other men are, in a cave and now living in fear of Kari. According to Saria's people, their ancestors moved into the valley and hunted the white rhino to extinction. They erected a false image to convince others of their continued existence, but offended the gods, and the legend of the white rhino was born. Saria's people were sent a tribe of "dark people", who came to the valley seeking protection, but instead enslaved them. The only protection Saria's people had was the myth that the white rhino protected them, until a slave girl escaped and told them of the lie. As a result, the men were enslaved and the slave girl was made their queen, Kari. The tribe will only become bonded by the spirit again when the false idol is destroyed.

A "Devil" eventually chooses Saria as the next bride of the white rhino. David urges the men to join forces with the blonde women against the dark people. Escaping, the men disrupt the ceremony as the rhino-masked "Devil" is about to take Saria. David jumps the "Devil" and unmasks him as an African man. David frees Saria as more rhino-masked "Devils" emerge from the jungle, but the men and allied women pursue them, unaware that they do not know the jungle as well as they do. A battle breaks out between the two tribes in the jungle. A white rhino eventually appears and impales Kari. The creature begins to drive out the "Devils" and disappears into the jungle.

David takes Kari's white rhino brooch and offers it to Saria, who then refuses it, saying that the "Devils" will not be returning. Saria goes on to say that the legend is partly fulfilled and she heads over to the white rhino statue. David refuses to leave her, despite Saria saying that her world is not his. David confesses his love for Saria, but she moves away and replies that her love for him will always remain. She leaves David alone in the rain along with the statue of the white rhino. As if hypnotized, David touches the rhino's horn as lightning strikes.

David appears back in the high priest's temple just as they are about to proclaim judgment, but the idol begins to break and crumble to pieces. The priest announces that the legend of the rhino is broken and orders the destruction of the "false idol's temple", whilst David flees and rejoins his guide. At the camp, David wonders whether his adventure was a dream and eventually discovers the brooch in his pocket. David is then asked to greet people from London. Sarah, one of the guests, is the spitting image of Saria.

== Cast ==
- Martine Beswick as Queen Kari
- Michael Latimer as David Marchent
- Carol White as Gido
- Steven Berkoff as John
- Edina Ronay as Saria/Sarah
- Stephanie Randall as Amyak
- Alexandra Stevenson as Luri
- Yvonne Horner as first Amazon
- Sydney Bromley as Ullo
- Frank Hayden as Arja
- Robert Raglan as Colonel Hammond
- Mary Hignett as Mrs. Hammond
- Louis Mahoney as head boy
- Bari Jonson as the High Priest
- Danny Daniels as Jakara

== Production ==
Producer and director Michael Carreras wrote the screenplay as "Henry Younger." To save money, Hammer used nearly all the sets and the Carl Toms-designed costumes left over from One Million Years B.C. (1966). Hammer filmed the movie at Elstree Studios from 10 January to 22 February 1966, immediately after film work on One Million Years B.C. was completed and the movie was still in post-production. The film was shot in DeLuxe Color and CinemaScope.

With the exception of several short clips of stock film footage at the movie's beginning, the entire production was filmed in studio. According to cinematographer Micahel Reed, "It was all filmed in the studio. The only problem this caused was to our health more than anything because we were working in dust all the time."

== Reception ==
=== Box office ===
According to Fox records, the double feature of the film and The Devil Rides Out needed to earn $1,450,000 in rentals to break even and made $1,265,000, meaning they made a loss.

=== Critical response ===
There's a bit of light bondage, a particularly silly spot of girl-on-girl wrestling, and lots of scenes in which people get wet for no particular reason. There's also, briefly, an appearance by that Hammer staple, the crazy old man who imparts dire warnings. This time the warnings are philosophical - keeping people as slaves leads to trouble - but in a film whose ending celebrates the end of the unnatural reign of black people over white people and brunettes over blondes, it's hard to see what lessons have been learned. Still, this is too camp a film to offend, too shallow to be accused of having any kind of political meaning.

Monthly Film Bulletin said "After an opening which suggests a blend of Rider Haggard and H. G. Wells, this ludicrous farrago soon establishes its own comic strip level with dialogue to match. As a spoof it might have been hilarious, but there is every indication that the makers are in deadly earnest – even when Martine Beswick, clad in an animal skin bikini edged with miniature rhinoceros horns and charging around with a whip, dances herself into a trance before an audience of slaves and fellow Amazons before throwing herself at the feet of her captive white hunter. One of the feeblest Hammer films to date, in fact, and not surprisingly kept on the shelf for a couple of years."

Tom Lisanti wrote in Film Fatales: Women in Espionage Films and Television 1962-1973: "[Beswick] was cast as Queen Kari in the film Prehistoric Women, a sort of follow up to the successful One Million Years BC [1966]. As the seductive and deadly leader of a tribe of lost amazons, Beswick had one of the great roles of a lifetime. Unfortunately, the production was plagued by indifferent direction, a low budget, and the fact that it was following up a gargantuan worldwide box office hit."

Marcus Hearn wrote in The Hammer Vault: "An eccentric and unloved Hammer film that uses a blondes vs. brunettes scenario."

Leonard Maltin reviewed the film as: "Idiotic Hammer Film in which the Great White Hunter stumbles into a lost Amazon civilization where blondes have been enslaved by brunettes. Honest! Nevertheless it has developed a cult following due to Beswick’s commanding, sensual performance as the tribe’s leader."

== Legacy ==
Hammer reportedly viewed the film as one of their worst productions, delaying the film's premier in Great Britain by nearly two years and re-titling the movie to Slave Girls.

Beswick claims that she "particularly enjoyed doing Prehistoric Women because even though it was such a B-film, the dialogue gave me some meaty diatribes against men, and, although I never considered myself a feminist, it was immensely satisfying to verbalize." Beswick also credited Carreras with encouraging her to be as wicked and cruel as possible, a role she said was greeted by mutual laughter between takes.

== See also ==
- Prehistoric Women (1950 film) film of the same genre but different plot
- Blonde versus brunette rivalry
