= Ralph Bates =

English film and television actor (1940–1991)

- Photo by Edward Wing, 1970s
- Born: 12 February 1940; Bristol, England
- Died: 27 March 1991 (aged 51); London, England
- Education: Trinity College, Dublin (BA); Yale University (MFA)
- Occupation: Actor
- Years active: 1963–1990
- Spouses: Joanna Van Gyseghem (m. 1964; div. 1973) Virginia Wetherell (m. 1973)
- Children: 3

Ralph Bates (12 February 1940 – 27 March 1991) was an English film and television actor. His credits included The Caesars (1968), Taste the Blood of Dracula (1970), The Horror of Frankenstein (1970), Lust for a Vampire (1971), Dr. Jekyll and Sister Hyde (1971), The Six Wives of Henry VIII (1970), Moonbase 3 (1973), Poldark (1975-1977), Secret Army (1979), Turtle's Progress (1980), Second Chance (1981), Minder on the Orient Express (1985), Dear John (1986-1987), Screen Two (1989), and King of the Wind (1990).

== Early life ==
Bates was born in Bristol, England. His parents were both psychiatrists; his mother was French and he was a great-great-grandson of French scientist Louis Pasteur. He held dual-nationality and was bilingual, and was educated at Trinity College Dublin. He read French there, before winning a scholarship to attend Yale Drama School.

== Career ==
In 1968, he made his screen debut portraying Caligula in the BBC television series The Caesars (1968).

Later, Bates carved a niche in the world of horror films and played important roles or the lead in several Hammer Horror productions, such as Taste the Blood of Dracula (1970), The Horror of Frankenstein (1970), Lust for a Vampire (1971), and Dr. Jekyll and Sister Hyde (1971), in which he played a doctor who mistakenly transforms himself into a beautiful siren.

He played Thomas Culpeper in an episode of The Six Wives of Henry VIII (1970), he starred in the series Moonbase 3 (1973), and Poldark (1975-1977), in which he played villainous George Warleggan for 29 episodes.

He also played communist Paul Vercors in the final season of the drama series Secret Army (1979). In 1981 he had played a lead role in Second Chance (1981). Because of his French ancestry and dark looks, he often was chosen to play a Frenchman on television, such as in an episode of ITV comedy drama Turtle's Progress (1980). Bates also appeared in the television movie Minder on the Orient Express (1985), again as a Frenchman.

It looked, for some time, as if he might remain typecast in sinister roles, but he was offered a part in comedy series Dear John (1986-1987), by the writer John Sullivan, which saw Bates cast in a more sympathetic role as the newly divorced member of a singles group. It ran for two series, and gave him chance to display a talent for comic roles.

His last roles were as Ed in the episode: "Flying in the Branches" in Screen Two (1989), and as LeDuc in the film King of the Wind (1990).

== Personal life, illness and death ==
In 1964 Bates married actress Joanna Van Gyseghem. The marriage ended in divorce. In 1973 he married actress Virginia Wetherell. The couple had a daughter and a son.

Bates was diagnosed with pancreatic cancer and died from the disease ten weeks later in London, at the age of 51.

== Ralph Bates Pancreatic Cancer Research Fund ==
The Ralph Bates Pancreatic Cancer Research Fund is a registered charity.

The charity mainly funds research at St George's University of London, where work is currently focused on the effectiveness of drugs or a combination of drugs on pancreatic cancer cells and also their effectiveness in inhibiting cell resistance to chemotherapy. The research has resulted in a high impact publication in the International Journal of Cancer, showing that a commonly used antibiotic, Doxycycline, is capable of inducing cell death in human pancreatic cancer cells.

== Filmography ==
=== Film ===
Year	Title	Role	Notes
1970	Taste the Blood of Dracula	Lord Courtley	
1970	The Horror of Frankenstein	Victor Frankenstein	
1971	Lust for a Vampire	Giles Barton	Alternate titles: Love for a Vampire, To Love a Vampire
1971	Dr. Jekyll and Sister Hyde	Dr. Henry Jekyll	
1972	Fear in the Night	Robert Heller	
1974	Persecution	David Masters	Alternate titles: Sheba, The Terror of Sheba, The Graveyard
1975	I Don't Want to Be Born	Gino Carlesi	Alternate titles: The Devil Within Her, The Monster
1986	Letters to an Unknown Lover	Bernard	TV movie
1990	King of the Wind	LeDuc	

=== Television ===
Year	Title	Role	Notes
1967	Mrs Thursday	Window dresser	Episode: "Charity Begins at a Ball"
1967	Coronation Street	Russ Parks	1 episode
1968	The Caesars	Caligula	3 episodes
1970	The Six Wives of Henry VIII	Thomas Culpepper	Episode: "Catherine Howard"
1971	Jason King	Alan Keeble	Episode: "Variations on a Theme"
1971	Play for Today	Peter	Episode: "Thank You Very Much"
1972	The Persuaders!	Michel	Episode: "Nuisance Value"
1973	Moonbase 3	Michael Lebrun	6 episodes
1973	The Protectors	David Lee	Episode: "Petard"
1975	Z-Cars	Roy Hurst	Episode: "Distance"
1975	Thriller	Michael Spencer	Episode: "Murder Hotel"
1975-1977	Poldark	George Warleggan	23 episodes
1976	Dangerous Knowledge	Sanders	6 episodes
1976	Softly, Softly: Task Force	Text	Episode: "Text"
1979	Penmaric	Laurence Castallack	3 episodes
1979	Secret Army	Paul Vercors	4 episodes
1980	Turtle's Progress	Peter Sablon	1 episode
1981	Second Chance	Chris Hurst	6 episodes
1982	Tales of the Uxexpected	Paul Foster	Episode: "Blue Marigold"
1982	The Agatha Christie Hour	Vincent Easton	Episode: "Magnolia Blossom"
1983	The Gentle Touch	Wally Tate	Episode: "Who's Afraid of Josie Tate"
1984	The Odd Job Man	Major Drew	3 episodes
1985	Minder	Francois LeBlanc	Episode: "Minder on the Orient Express"
1986-1987	Dear John	John Lacey	14 episodes
1987	Farrington of the F.O.	James Mapley	Episode: "We're Having a Heat Wave"
1989	Screen Two	Ed	Episode: "Flying in the Branches"
