= Marguerite Hardiman =

English television actress (born 1950)

- Born: 25 September 1950 (age 76); London, England

Marguerite Hardiman (born 25 September 1950) is an English television actress who has appeared in Crossroads; Softly, Softly, Play For Today, Robin's Nest and Sorry! as Muriel. She also appeared in the British horror film Disciple of Death (1972) starring Mike Raven.
