= Dr. Jekyll and Sister Hyde =

1971 British film by Roy Ward Baker

- U.S. theatrical release poster
- Directed by: Roy Ward Baker
- Written by: Brian Clemens
- Based on: Strange Case of Dr. Jekyll and Mr. Hyde; 1886 novella by Robert Louis Stevenson
- Produced by: Brian Clemens; Albert Fennell
- Starring: Ralph Bates; Martine Beswick; Gerald Sim; Lewis Fiander
- Cinematography: Norman Warwick
- Edited by: James Needs
- Music by: David Whitaker
- Production company: Hammer Film Productions
- Distributed by: MGM-EMI Distributors (UK); AIP (US)
- Release dates: 7 November 1971 (UK); 15 April 1972 (US)
- Running time: 97 minutes (UK); 95 minutes (US)
- Country: United Kingdom
- Language: English

Dr. Jekyll and Sister Hyde is a 1971 British horror film directed by Roy Ward Baker and starring Ralph Bates and Martine Beswick. It was based on the 1886 novella Strange Case of Dr Jekyll and Mr Hyde by Robert Louis Stevenson. The film was made by British studio Hammer Film Productions and was their third adaptation of the story after The Ugly Duckling (1959) and The Two Faces of Dr. Jekyll (1960). The film is notable for showing Dr. Henry Jekyll transform into the female Edwina Hyde; it also incorporates into the plot aspects of the historical Jack the Ripper and Burke and Hare cases. (Note: Though historically the murders committed by Jack the Ripper and those by Burke and Hare were more than fifty years apart.)

== Plot ==
Dr. Henry Jekyll dedicates his life to the curing of all known illnesses; however, his lecherous friend Professor Robertson remarks that Jekyll's experiments take so long to be discovered, he will no doubt be dead by the time he achieves anything. Haunted by this remark, Jekyll abandons his studies and obsessively begins searching for an elixir of life, using female hormones taken from fresh cadavers supplied by murderers William Burke and William Hare, reasoning that these hormones will help him to extend his life since women traditionally live longer than men and have stronger systems.

In the apartment above Jekyll's lives a family: an elderly mother, her daughter Susan Spencer and Susan's brother Howard. Susan is attracted to Jekyll and he returns her affections but is too obsessed with his work to make advances. Mixing the female hormones into a serum and drinking it has the effect of changing Jekyll's sex. Susan becomes jealous when she discovers this mysterious woman. Still, when she confronts Jekyll to explain the sudden appearance of his female alter ego, he calls her Mrs. Edwina Hyde, saying she is Jekyll's widowed sister who has come to live with him. Howard, on the other hand, develops a lust for Mrs. Hyde.

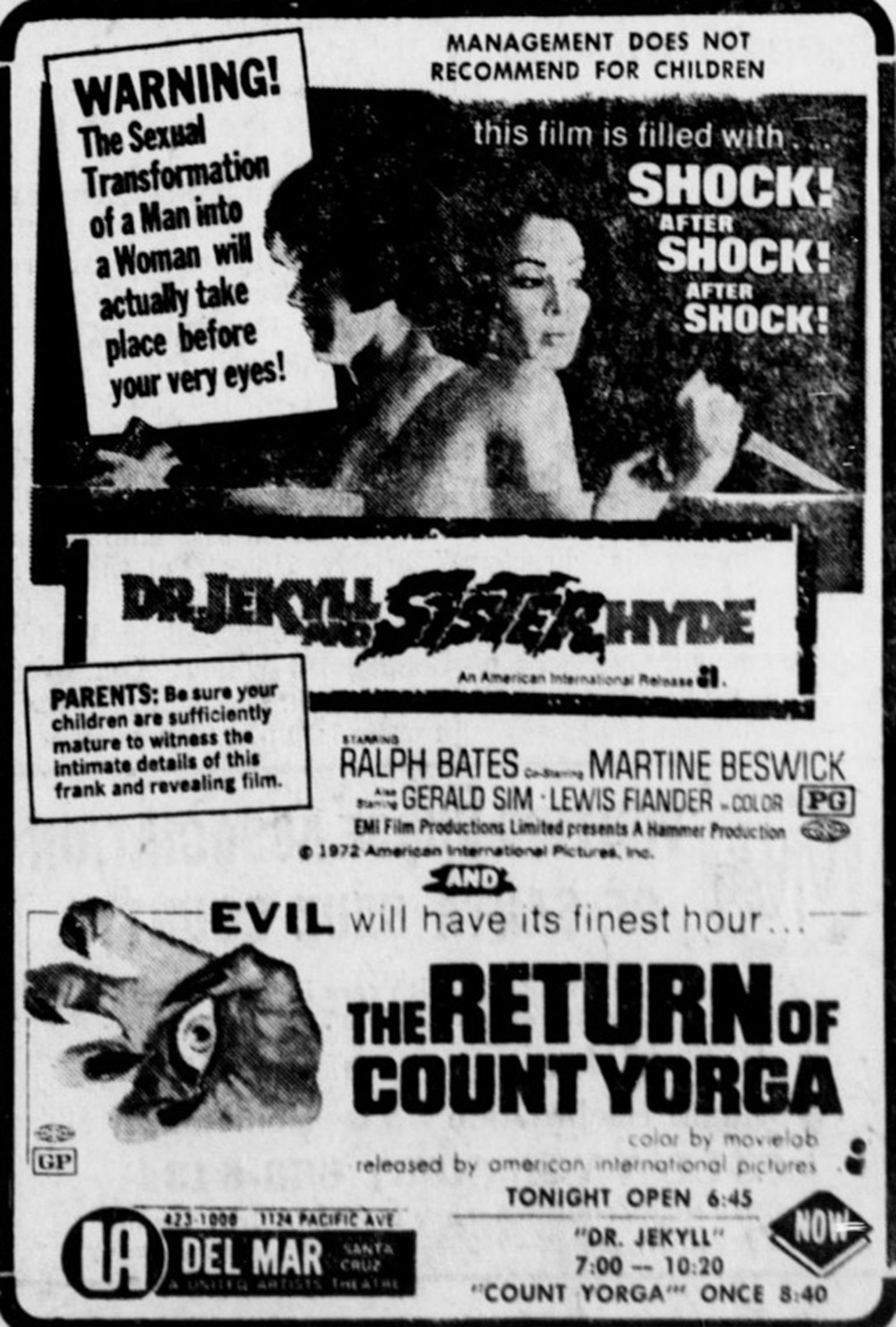
Advertisement from 1972 for Dr. Jekyll and Sister Hyde and co-feature, The Return of Count Yorga.

Jekyll soon finds that his serum requires a regular supply of female hormones to maintain its effect, necessitating the killing of young girls. Burke and Hare supply his needs but their criminal activities are uncovered. A mob lynches Burke, and Hare is blinded by lime. Jekyll decides to take matters into his own hands and commits the murders attributed to Jack the Ripper. Jekyll abhors this but Mrs. Hyde relishes the killings as she begins to take control, even seducing and then killing Professor Robertson when he attempts to question her about the murders.

As Mrs. Hyde grows more powerful, the two personalities begin to struggle for dominance. Jekyll asks Susan to the opera; however, when he is getting dressed to go out, he unconsciously takes Mrs. Hyde's gown from the wardrobe instead of his clothes, realizing that he no longer needs to drink the serum to transform.

Susan is heartbroken when Jekyll fails to take her out to the opera and she decides to go alone. However, Mrs. Hyde decides that innocent, pure Susan's blood is just what she needs to take over Jekyll's body. She stalks Susan through the dark streets but Jekyll's willpower barely manages to thwart Mrs. Hyde's attempt to kill Susan. He then commits one last murder to find a way to stabilize his condition. Still, he is interrupted by the police after a comment by Hare leads them to realize the similarity between Jekyll's earlier experiments on cadavers and the Ripper murders. As Jekyll tries to escape by climbing along the outside of a building, he transforms into Mrs. Hyde and falls to the ground, dying as an amalgamation of both male and female.

== Cast ==
- Ralph Bates as Dr. Henry Jekyll/Jack the Ripper
- Martine Beswick as Mrs. Edwina Hyde
- Gerald Sim as Professor Robertson
- Lewis Fiander as Howard Spencer
- Susan Brodrick as Susan Spencer
- Dorothy Alison as Mrs. Spencer
- Ivor Dean as William Burke
- Tony Calvin as William Hare
- Philip Madoc as Byker
- Paul Whitsun-Jones as Sergeant Danvers
- Virginia Wetherell as Betsy

== Production ==
The film originated from an idea by screenwriter and producer Brian Clemens. Clemens later recalled that he initially suggested the title Dr. Jekyll and Sister Hyde as a joke to Hammer executives, but was subsequently invited to develop the concept; when he returned for a meeting, promotional artwork for the proposed film had already been produced.

Finance came from EMI Films.

== Critical reception ==
The movie is generally considered one of Hammer's best films of the 1970s. The Monthly Film Bulletin wrote: "The idea of adapting Jekyll and Hyde for the age of the polymorphous perverse could easily have misfired in the wrong hands, but for the most part director Roy Ward Baker manages the whole thing superbly. The plot is a kind of pot-pourri of Victorian archetypes, containing not just the Jekyll mythos but Jack the Ripper as well as Burke and Hare; and although there are plenty of covert jokes on Psycho lines ("He hasn't been feeling himself lately"), the overall tone remains refreshingly straight. Ralph Bates is infinitely better at being Henry Jekyll than he was at being Baron Frankenstein, and the transformation sequences are stunning, with Bates appearing momentarily emasculated before being transformed into his seductive alter ego, Martine Beswick. Obviously the production suffers from the old Hammer problems of low budget and short schedule, but Baker and his cameraman Norman Warwick have done a lot to make the film visually attractive, and this goes some way towards compensating for the deficiencies of the script. ... Admittedly, the conception is sacrificed to the usual formula, and it is Jekyll not Hyde who is hunted down in rather routine fashion by the authorities. But the film remains a welcome reminder that Hammer can still be highly enterprising myth-makers." Time Out called the film "enormous fun" and an "admirably successful attempt to ring new changes on an old theme".

George R. Reis from DVD Drive-In gave the film a positive review, writing, "In the hands of most filmmakers of the time, such a gender-bending theme would call for maximum exploitation tactics, but not with Hammer. Clemens' script doesn't take itself too seriously, yet justly fuses the legends of Stevenson's titular character with Jack the Ripper and the graverobbers Burke and Hare". Reis commended the film's performances and Baker's direction. Variety called the film "highly imaginative", further writing, "Director Roy Ward Baker has set a good pace, built tension nicely and played it straight so that all seems credible. He tops chills and gruesome murders with quite a lot of subtle fun. Bates and Beswick, strong, attractive personalities, bear a strange resemblance to each other making the transitions entirely believable." John Higgins of Starburst awarded the film 8/10 stars, praising Beswick's performance and the script.

=== Accolades ===
| Year | Award / Film Festival | Category | Recipient(s) | Result |
|---|---|---|---|---|
| 1973 | 2nd French Fantastic Cinema Convention | Best Screenplay | Brian Clemens | Won |

== Home media ==
The film was first released on DVD in 2001 by Anchor Bay as part of The Hammer Collection in the U.S. and has since been released on DVD in other territories. The film was released on Blu-ray in 2018.
