= Jack Allen (actor) =

English actor (1907–1995)

- Born: Robert John Lea Allen; 23 October 1907; Sandbach, Cheshire, England
- Died: 25 May 1995 (aged 87); London, England
- Years active: 1931–1982
- Spouse: Ruth Dunning (?-1983; her death)

Robert John Lea Allen (23 October 1907 – 25 May 1995) was an English film, theatre and television actor.

== Career ==
He made his stage debut in 1931 at the Liverpool Playhouse, appearing in The Swan and had a long theatrical career which lasted until 1980, when he appeared as Old Siward at the Old Vic in a production of Macbeth.

He made his film debut in The Angelus (1937), while his most notable role was as Lieutenant Thomas Willoughby in the classic 1939 version of The Four Feathers directed by Zoltan Korda. He went on to have supporting roles in a number of films and television series until the 1980s, usually as typically British gentlemen and officer types.

Films include The Sound Barrier (1952), The Heart of the Matter (1953), Jack the Ripper (1959), The Queen's Guards (1961) and Ned Kelly (1970).

On television he played Major Upshot-Bagley during the second series of popular 1950s sitcom The Army Game and made appearances in The Adventures of Robin Hood, Tell It to the Marines, Dixon of Dock Green, Danger Man, The Prisoner, Coronation Street, The Sweeney and Crown Court.

He also served during World War II.

== Selected filmography ==
- Conspirator (1949)
- Wings of Danger (1952)
- The Sound Barrier (1952)
- The Heart of the Matter (1953)
- Radio Cab Murder (1954)
- Impulse (1954)
- Man from Tangier (1957)
- Life in Danger (1959)
- Jack the Ripper (1959)
- The Breaking Point (1961)
- Bomb in the High Street (1961)
- The Big Switch (1968)
- Ned Kelly (1970)
- House of Mortal Sin (1975)
