= Disciple of Death =

1972 British film directed by Tom Parkinson

- Lobby card
- Directed by: Tom Parkinson
- Written by: Tom Parkinson; Mike Raven (as Churton Fairman)
- Produced by: Tom Parkinson; Mike Raven
- Starring: Mike Raven; Ronald Lacey; Nicholas Amer; Stephen Bradley
- Cinematography: William Brayne
- Production company: Embassy Pictures
- Release date: 1972
- Running time: 84 minutes
- Country: United Kingdom
- Language: English

Disciple of Death is a 1972 British horror film directed by Tom Parkinson and starring Mike Raven, Ronald Lacey and Nicholas Amer. It was written by Parkinson and Mike Raven.

== Plot ==
In 18th century Cornwall, a minion of Satan poses as a priest to get closer to young, virginal women needed for human sacrifice.

== Cast ==
- Mike Raven as stranger
- Ronald Lacey as Parson
- Nicholas Amer as Melchisidech
- Stephen Bradley as Ralph
- Marguerite Hardiman as Julia
- Virginia Wetherell as Ruth
- George Belbin as Squire
- Betty Alberge as Dorothy
- Rusty Goffe as dwarf
- Louise Jameson as Betty
- Joe Dunlop as Mathew
- Daisika as gypsy

== Reception ==
The Monthly Film Bulletin wrote: "Disciple of Death, the second offering from the Crucible of Terror team, shares with its predecessor the same leading players (Mike Raven and Ronald Lacey) and the use of Cornish locations. The film veers uneasily between Grand Guignol (the close-up of a hand squeezing blood from a heart into a goblet; the dwarf feeding noisily on the parson's neck) and parody, the latter emphasised by Raven's gestures and intonation (straight out of Victorian Era melodrama) and by Lacey's sustained impersonation of Charles Laughton. Tom Parkinson, who both photographed and co-scripted the previous film, shows a good eye for colour, especially the varied reds in the scenes of ritual sacrifice. Occasionally, though, his over-fondness for telephoto shots in the location sequences lends a deadening flatness to the frame."
