= Tell It to the Marines (TV series) =

British TV sitcom (1959–1960)

- Genre: Sitcom
- Created by: Ted Willis
- Written by: Eric Paice; Malcolm A Hulke; Dick Vosburgh; Brad Ashton
- Starring: Alan White; Ronald Hines; Ian MacNaughton; Jack Allen; Henry McGee
- Country of origin: United Kingdom
- No. of series: 1
- No. of episodes: 30

Production
- Running time: 30 minutes
- Production company: Associated-Rediffusion

Original release
- Network: ITV
- Release: 23 September 1959 – 13 April 1960

Tell It to the Marines is a British television sitcom that aired on ITV from 1959 to 1960. The series was based on the rivalry between the Marines and the Royal Navy. The series is believed to be lost.

== Background ==
Jack Hylton, who had an exclusive contract to provide Associated-Rediffusion's entertainment programmes, was keen to mirror the success of Granada's sitcom The Army Game. Tell It to the Marines was created by Ted Willis, who had created the police drama Dixon of Dock Green, and the theme music by jazz musician Chris Barber. The series was not a success. Of the 30 episodes, Milo Lewis directed 29 and Tig Roe one.

== Cast ==
- Alan White – Leading Seaman White
- Ronald Hines – Marine Corporal Surtees
- Ian MacNaughton – Dalrymple
- Jack Allen – Major Howard
- Henry McGee – Lt Raleigh
- Ian Colin – Commander Walters
- John Baskcomb – Petty Officer Woodward
- Ian Whittaker – Whittle
- Norman Chappell – Tubby

== Plot ==
The series is based on the rivalry at both officer and lower ranks level between the Royal Navy and the Royal Marines when the latter are billeted with the former.

== Episodes ==
Tell It to the Marines aired every week from September 1959 to April 1960 on Wednesdays, mostly at 7.00pm. Due to the archival policies of the time, all 30 episodes have been wiped and none are known to survive.
