= Louise Jameson =

English actress (born 1951)

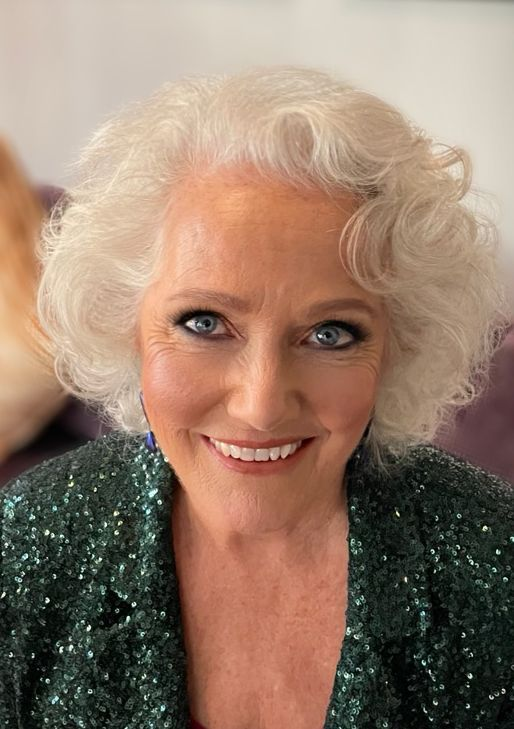
- Jameson in 2022
- Born: Louise Marion Jameson; 20 April 1951 (age 75); Wanstead, Essex, England
- Education: Royal Academy of Dramatic Art
- Occupation: Actress
- Years active: 1970–present
- Spouse: Martin Bedford (m. 1990; div. 1997)
- Children: 2
- Website: louisejameson.com

Louise Marion Jameson (born 20 April 1951) is an English actress with a variety of television and theatre credits. Her roles on television have included playing Leela in Doctor Who (1977–1978), Anne Reynolds in The Omega Factor (1979), Blanche Simmons in Tenko (1981–1982), Susan Young in Bergerac (1985–1990), Rosa di Marco in EastEnders (1998–2000), Viv Roberts in River City (2008) and Mary Goskirk in Emmerdale (2022–present).

According to Screenonline, Jameson "was one of a handful of actresses who both benefited from and contributed to the opening out of roles for women on British television during the 1970s and 80s, when she became associated with a series of tough, resourceful and independent characters in genres where women had conventionally been either victims or vamps."

== Biography ==
=== Early life and career ===
Jameson was born in Wanstead, Essex and grew up in nearby Woodford Green. Jameson attended the independent Braeside School, Buckhurst Hill. She attended the Royal Academy of Dramatic Art from the ages of seventeen to nineteen and shared a flat with fellow drama students Sherrie Hewson and Sharon Maughan before spending two years with the Royal Shakespeare Company, performing in Romeo and Juliet, The Taming of the Shrew, King Lear, Summerfolk, and Blithe Spirit. Her early TV career highlights include appearances on Emmerdale Farm in 1973 as Sharon Crossthwaite, the first character in the soap to be murdered, and roles in Z-Cars and the television film The Game in 1977. She also appeared opposite Mike Raven in the low budget British horror film Disciple of Death (1972).

=== Doctor Who ===
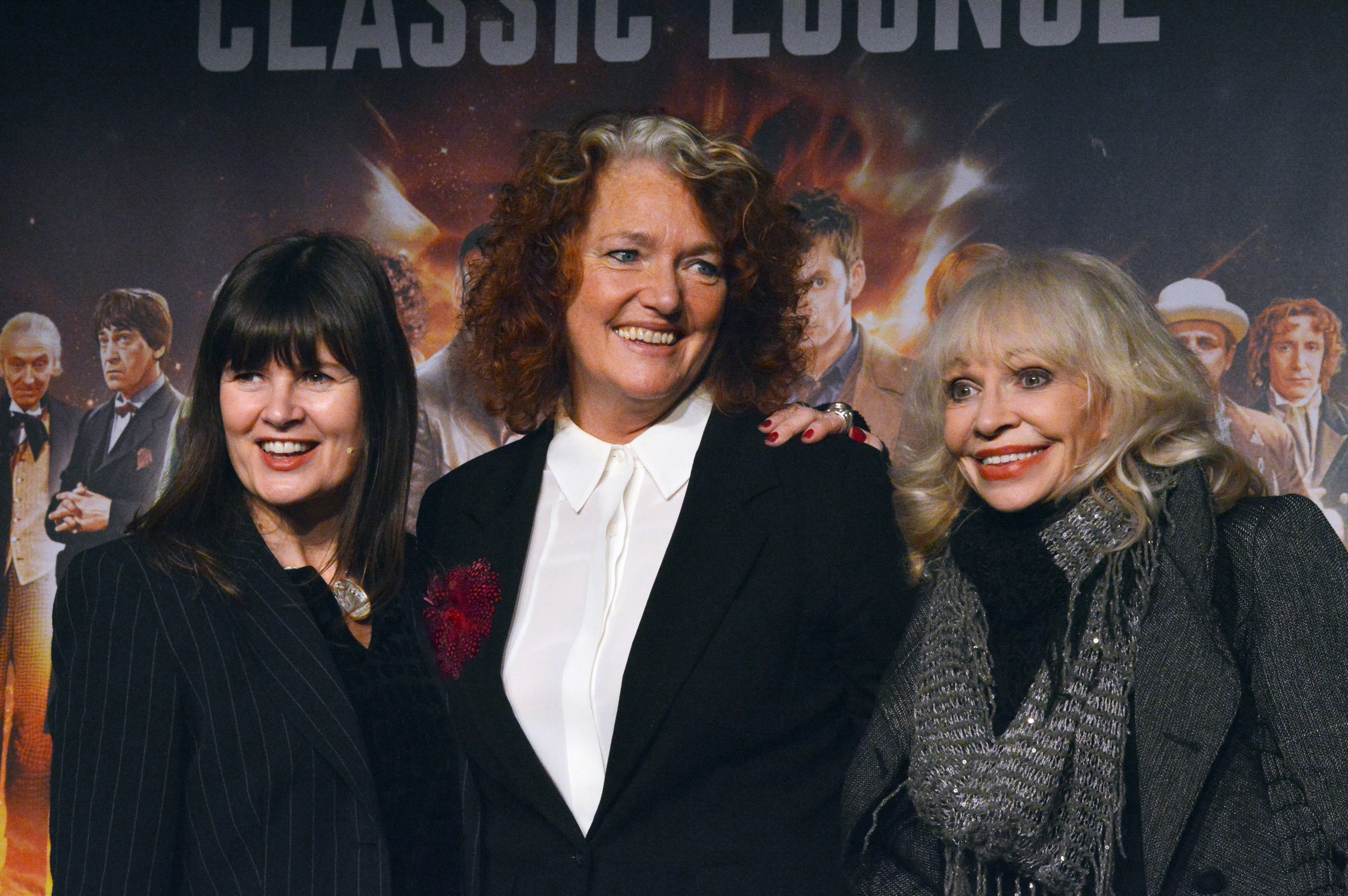
Jameson with Sophie Aldred and Katy Manning at a Doctor Who 50th Anniversary event in 2013.

Jameson came to widespread attention when she was cast by director Pennant Roberts as Leela, the leather-clad companion of the Fourth Doctor in Doctor Who. The character is a warrior of the fictional Sevateem people, and was introduced in The Face of Evil (1977). Jameson's inspirations for the way that she played the character included her dog, for "her instinctive nature and tendency to slightly cock her head when she perceives something", and a neighbour's child, for "openness and naïveté".

Jameson's costuming in the series receives much comment and some criticism from feminists, with Mark Duguid writing for Screenonline that it "said much about the failure of 1970s feminism to permeate the BBC's production or costume departments". Valerie Estelle Frankel, in her book on Women in Doctor Who, characterises Leela as "a classic warrior woman" but says that the seriousness of the character is undermined because "her provocatively cut hunting leathers and cleavage are offered to the male gaze in every episode." Patrick Mulkern of Radio Times also regarded her as "a companion to lure in adolescent lads and their dads" but, while considering her debut serial to be a "lifeless tale", he wrote that Jameson was "a wonderful find. Exuding commitment and conviction, she makes Leela earnest, warm and funny, elevating her far beyond Robert Holmes's desire for a 'Raquel Welch in the jungle'. Quite simply, she's one of the most naturally gifted actresses ever to play a companion." In 2008 Jameson said, "In a way the companion was a bit of a device when I was in Doctor Who, though I did love her feistiness and her intelligence and her aggression and her intelligence – even though she wasn't educated."

Jameson was initially paid £120 an episode for Doctor Who, later increasing to £150 an episode. She left the series after nine serials, departing in The Invasion of Time (1978).

=== After Doctor Who ===
Jameson went on to appear in The Omega Factor (1979) as Dr. Anne Reynolds. She later had a leading role as Blanche Simmons in the first two series of Tenko, before starring for five years in the late 1980s in Bergerac as Susan Young, Jim Bergerac's girlfriend. In the mid-1980s, she played Tania Braithwaite, Pandora's mother, in both The Secret Diary of Adrian Mole and The Growing Pains of Adrian Mole for Thames Television. In the early 1990s, she starred in the two series of Rides, and made numerous one-off appearances in various TV drama series, as well as numerous Doctor Who spin-off projects including the Children in Need special Dimensions in Time (1993). In 1995, she appeared in the RSC production of Botho Strauß's The Park. Other stage appearances include the first production of Peter Nichols's Passion Play produced at the Aldwych Theatre, London, in 1981. In 1998, Jameson began a long run in the BBC soap EastEnders as Rosa di Marco, appearing in over 200 episodes over two and a half years until August 2000. Since then, she has appeared in episodes of the BBC Scotland soap River City as Viv Roberts, as a guest artist in episodes of Doctors, Holby City and The Bill and as a regular in Doc Martin.

Jameson continues to reprise the characters of Leela and Anne Reynolds in audio plays produced by Big Finish Productions and has also starred in Sapphire & Steel and Dark Shadows audio dramas for the same company. She has also appeared in documentaries and commentaries accompanying numerous BBC DVD releases of her Doctor Who serials. She is the subject of MJTV's The Actor Speaks Volume 5, where she discusses herself, her acting career and the various series she has been in. In 2007, Jameson toured nationally in her one-woman show, Face Value. In 2013, she starred in the play Gutted by Rikki Beadle-Blair and was nominated for the 2013 Offie for Best Female Performance. In November 2013, she appeared in the one-off 50th anniversary comedy homage The Five(ish) Doctors Reboot. In 2016, she toured in Agatha Christie's The Mousetrap, the longest running show in British theatre. In 2022, she joined the cast of Emmerdale as Mary Goskirk.

== Personal life ==
In 1990, Jameson married Martin Bedford, an artist whom she had met while filming Bergerac in Jersey. They divorced in 1997.

Jameson was a regular prison visitor, monitoring prisoners' welfare, during the first few years of her career; and, during the early 1970s, she met Leslie Grantham at Leyhill Prison in Gloucestershire, where he was serving 12 years of a life sentence for murder. She encouraged Grantham to become an actor.

== Filmography ==
=== Film ===
| Year | Title | Role | Notes |
|---|---|---|---|
| 1972 | Disciple of Death | Betty | |
| 1994 | The Terror Game | Tamora Hennessy | |
| 1994 | The Zero Imperative | Patricia Haggard | |
| 1995 | The Devil of Winterborne | Patricia Haggard | |
| 1996 | Unnatural Selection | Patricia Haggard | |
| 1996 | Ghosts of Winterborne | Patricia Haggard | |
| 1998 | After Celia | Corinne | |
| 1999 | The Last 28 | May | |
| 2005 | Big Night Out | Lynne | |
| 2012 | Run for Your Wife | Receptionist | Cameo |
| 2017 | Crossing Over | Angela Winters | |
| 2018 | Modern Love | Mum | |

=== Television ===
| Year | Title | Role | Notes | Ref. |
|---|---|---|---|---|
| 1971 | The Marty Feldman Comedy Machine | Girl | Episode: #1.2 | |
| 1971 | Tom Brown's Schooldays | Mary Arnold | TV Series; 5 episodes | |
| 1971 | Cider With Rosie | Junior teacher | TV film | |
| 1973 | Emmerdale Farm | Sharon Crossthwaite | 4 episodes | |
| 1976 | Play for Today | Stella | Episode: "The Peddler" | |
| 1976 | Dominic | Lady Harriet | 4 episodes | |
| 1977 | The Game | Elsie Whitworth | TV film | |
| 1977–1978 | Doctor Who | Leela | 40 episodes | |
| 1979 | The Omega Factor | Dr. Anne Reynolds | All 10 episodes | |
| 1981–1982 | Tenko | Blanche Simmons | 13 episodes | |
| 1984 | The Gentle Touch | Emma Saunders | Episode: "Mad Dog" | |
| 1985 | The Secret Diary of Adrian Mole | Tania Braithwaite | 3 episodes | |
| 1985–1990 | Bergerac | Susan Young | 32 episodes | |
| 1987 | The Growing Pains of Adrian Mole | Tania Braithwaite | Episode: #1.5 | |
| 1990-1995 | Casualty | Judy/Janet Tolchard | 2 episodes | |
| 1991-2004 | The Bill | Irene Harris/Julie Wiletts | 3 episodes | |
| 1992–1993 | Rides | Janet | 6 episodes | |
| 1992 | My Friend Walter | Joan Throckmorton | TV film | |
| 1993 | Dimensions in Time | Leela | TV short; Part Two | |
| 1994 | Degas and Pissarro Fall Out | Jenny | TV film | |
| 1995 | Wycliffe | Tilly Rawle | Episode: "Wild Oats" | |
| 1995 | Stick with Me, Kid | Mrs. Hilliard | | |
| 1995 | Molly | Alice Greenfield | Episode: #1.10 | |
| 1996 | The Upper Hand | Emma | Episode: "In Marriage We Trust" | |
| 1997 | The Pale Horse | Florence Tuckerton | TV film | |
| 1998–2000 | EastEnders | Rosa di Marco | 231 episodes | |
| 2000 | The Canterbury Tales | Falcon / Horsewoman | Voice; Episode: "The Journey Back" | |
| 2006-2019 | Doctors | Various | 6 episodes | |
| 2008 | River City | Viv Roberts | 3 episodes | |
| 2011 | The Vessel | Kim's Mum | 2 episodes | |
| 2011 | Doc Martin | Eleanor Glasson | 5 episodes | |
| 2012 | Holby City | Mary Thorne | Episode: "Fault Lines" | |
| 2013 | The Dumping Ground | Angel | Episode: "The Truth Is Out There" | |
| 2013 | The Five(ish) Doctors Reboot | Louise Jameson | TV film | |
| 2013 | The Tractate Middoth | Mary Simpson | TV film | |
| 2014 | Toast of London | Wendy Nook | Episode: "Match Fit" | |
| 2015 | Guin and the Dragon | Melinda the Dragon Lady | TV film | |
| 2019 | Secret Life of Boys | Granny Bob | 3 episodes | |
| 2020 | Silent Witness | Sue Marshall | 2 episodes | |
| 2020 | Bumps | Barbara | TV film | |
| 2021 | Midsomer Murders | Annie Davids | Episode: "The Wolf Hunter of Little Worthy" | |
| 2022–present | Emmerdale | Mary Goskirk | Series regular | |
| 2022 | McDonald & Dodds | Mrs. Burchard | Episode: "A Billion Beats" | |
| 2025 | Time Travelling With Myself | Anne Sparks | 2 episodes | |

== Theatre ==
- 1970: The Lower Depths – Anna/Old Woman – Vanbrugh Theatre, London
- 1972: The Glass Menagerie – Laura – The Byre Theatre, St. Andrews
- 1973: Romeo and Juliet – Woman – Royal Shakespeare Theatre, Stratford-upon-Avon
- 1973: Richard II – Small role – Royal Shakespeare Theatre, Stratford-upon-Avon
- 1973: Love's Labour's Lost – Jaquenetta – Royal Shakespeare Theatre, Stratford-upon-Avon
- 1973: The Taming of the Shrew – Bianca Minola – Royal Shakespeare Theatre, Stratford-upon-Avon
- 1974: King John – Blanche of Spain – Royal Shakespeare Theatre, Stratford-upon-Avon
- 1974: Lear – Cordelia – The Other Place, Stratford-upon-Avon
- 1974: I Was Shakespeare’s Double – Anne – The Other Place, Stratford-upon-Avon
- 1974: Summerfolk – Sonya – Aldwych Theatre, London
- 1974: The Marquis of Keith – Molly Griesinger – Aldwych Theatre, London
- 1975: King John – Blanche of Spain – Aldwych Theatre, London
- 1975: Love's Labour's Lost – Jaquenetta – UK Tour
- 1975: Love's Labour's Lost – Jaquenetta – Aldwych Theatre, London
- 1975: Serjeant Musgrave's Dance – Anne – Bristol Old Vic, Bristol
- 1975: The Merchant of Venice – Portia – Bristol Old Vic, Bristol
- 1975: Hard Times – Louisa Gradgrind – Bristol Old Vic, Bristol
- 1976: Three Women – Main Role – Studio Theatre, Stratford-upon-Avon
- 1976: Private Lives – Sybil Chase – UK Tour
- 1978: Roots – Beatie Bryant – The Little Theatre, Bristol
- 1978: A View from the Bridge – Catherine – Bristol Old Vic, Bristol
- 1978: Arms and the Man – Raina – Bristol Old Vic, Bristol
- 1978: The Relapse, or, Virtue in Danger – Bernithia – Cambridge Arts Theatre, Cambridge
- 1979: The Country Holiday – Giacinta – Cambridge Arts Theatre, Cambridge
- 1979: King Lear – Regan – Oxford Playhouse, Oxford
- 1979: Touch and Go – Annabel Wrath – Royal Court Theatre, London
- 1980: All My Sons – Ann Deever – Bristol Old Vic, Bristol
- 1980: A Midsummer Night's Dream – Helena – Bristol Old Vic, Bristol
- 1980: Much Ado About Nothing – Beatrice – Oxford Playhouse, Oxford
- 1980: Peer Gynt – Various – Oxford Playhouse, Oxford
- 1980: Mephisto – Miriam Gottchalk – Oxford Playhouse, Oxford
- 1981: Passion Play – Kate – Aldwych Theatre, London
- 1981: Whose Life Is It Anyway? – Dr. Clare Scott – Churchill Theatre, Bromley
- 1983: Gas Light – Bella Manningham – Churchill Theatre, Bromley
- 1983: As You Like It – Rosalind – Regent's Park Open Air Theatre, London
- 1983: The Beaux' Stratagem – Mrs. Sullen – Bristol Old Vic, Bristol
- 1986: The Light Rough – Linda – Hampstead Theatre, Hampstead
- 1987: The Doctor's Dilemma – Jennifer Dubedat – Bristol Old Vic, Bristol
- 1988–1989: Sticky Fingers – Roxanne – King's Head Theatre, London
- 1989: Blithe Spirit – Elvira – UK Tour
- 1990: Barbarians – Nadiezhda – Barbican Centre, London
- 1993: Blithe Spirit – Elvira – UK Tour
- 1993: Mary Stuart – Mary, Queen of Scots – Battersea Arts Centre
- 1995: Heartbreak House – Mrs. Hushabye – Belgrade Theatre, Coventry
- 1995: The Park – Titania – The Pit, London
- 1996–1997: Death of a Salesman – The Woman – UK Tour
- 2001: Confusions – Various – UK Tour
- 2001: The Gentle Hook – Stacey Harrison – Theatre Royal, Windsor
- 2001: Sex Wars – Main Role – UK Tour
- 2002: Murder in Paris – Denyse Simenon – UK Tour
- 2002: The Ghost Train – Julia Price – UK Tour
- 2002: Corpse! – Mrs. McGee – UK Tour
- 2003: Corpse! – Mrs. McGee – UK Tour
- 2003: Seven Deadly Sins Four Deadly Sinners – Main Role – Palace Theatre, Westcliff-on-Sea
- 2003: Tom, Dick & Harry – Mrs. Potter – Theatre Royal, Windsor
- 2004: How the Other Half Loves – Main Role – Singapore
- 2004: Dinner – Wynne – Richmond Theatre, London
- 2004: Nobody's Fool – Fran – UK Tour
- 2005: Love Letters – Melissa Gardner – UK Tour
- 2005: Funny Money – Main Role – Singapore
- 2005: Tom, Dick & Harry – Mrs. Potter – Duke of York's Theatre, London
- 2006: Sit and Shiver – Mrs. Green – New End Theatre, London
- 2006: Arsenic and Old Lace – Abby Brewster – UK Tour
- 2007: Sit and Shiver – Mrs. Green – Hackney Empire, London
- 2007: Bedroom Farce – Delia – UK Tour
- 2008: Hamlet – Gertrude – Stafford Gatehouse Theatre, Stafford
- 2009: Women on the Edge of HRT – Vera – UK Tour
- 2010: We'll Always Have Paris – Raquel – The Mill at Sonning, Sonning Eye
- 2010: Stop Dreamin' – Doris White – London Tour
- 2011: Oedipus – Jocasta – UK Tour
- 2011: Love's the Thing – Lady Ditchling – Brighton Fringe Festival
- 2012–2013: My Gay Best Friend – Raquell – UK Tour
- 2013: Gutted – Bridie Prospect – Theatre Royal Stratford East, London
- 2014: Absurd Person Singular – Marion – The Mill at Sonning, Sonning Eye
- 2014: A Murder Is Announced – Miss Marple – UK Tour
- 2014: Time and the Conways – Mrs. Conway – Nottingham Playhouse, Nottingham
- 2015: Noises Off – Dotty Otley – Mercury Theatre, Colchester
- 2015: Love, Loss, and What I Wore – Gingy – The Mill at Sonning, Sonning Eye
- 2015: Driving Me Round the Bend – Georgina Best – The Space Arts Centre, London
- 2016: The Mousetrap – Mrs. Boyle – UK Tour
- 2016: Rumpy Pumpy – Jean Johnson – UK Tour
- 2017: A Murder Is Announced – Miss Marple – UK Tour
- 2017: Winter Hill – Beth – The Octagon Theatre, Bolton
- 2018: Vincent River – Anita – Park Theatre, London
- 2018: Ten Times Table – Helen – The Mill at Sonning, Sonning Eye
- 2018: The Madness of George III – Dr. Warren – Nottingham Playhouse, Nottingham
- 2019: Vincent River – Anita – Park Theatre, London
- 2019: Macbeth – Queen Duncan – Victorian Theatre, Tunbridge Wells
- 2021: Tennis Elbow – Mama – Royal Lyceum Theatre, Edinburgh
- 2021: The Mousetrap – Mrs. Boyle – St Martin's Theatre, London

=== One-woman shows ===
- 2010–2011: Shakespeare's Mistress – Herself – UK Tour
- 2011: Pulling Faces – Joanne Taylor – International Tour
- 2020: Shakespeare's Mistress – Herself – The Grove Theatre, Eastbourne

=== Pantomime ===
- 2000–2001: Snow White – The Wicked Queen – Wycombe Swan, Wycombe
- 2003–2004: Aladdin – Slave of the Ring – The Capitol Theatre, Horsham
- 2004–2005: Dick Whittington and His Cat – Fairy Bow Bells – Devonshire Park Theatre, Eastbourne
- 2015–2016: Cinderella – Fairy Godmother – Assembly Hall Theatre, Tunbridge Wells

=== As director ===
- 2003: Wotcha Will – Stratford Circus, London
- 2015: The Man with the Golden Pen – Jermyn Street Theatre, London
- 2020: Revenge – UK Tour
