= The Big Switch =

1968 British film by Pete Walker

- Directed by: Pete Walker
- Written by: Pete Walker
- Produced by: Charles J. Nicholl; Pete Walker
- Starring: Sebastian Breaks; Virginia Wetherell; Jack Allen
- Cinematography: Brian Tufano
- Edited by: Peter Austen-Hunt
- Music by: Harry South
- Production company: Peter Walker Film Productions
- Distributed by: Miracle Films
- Release date: April 1968
- Running time: 80 minutes
- Country: United Kingdom
- Language: English

The Big Switch (also known as Strip Poker) is a 1968 British crime film directed, written and produced by Pete Walker and starring Sebastian Breaks, Virginia Wetherell and Jack Allen.

== Plot ==
Playboy John Carter is implicated in the murder of a woman from a discotheque and is forced by gangsters into posing for pornographic photographs.

== Cast ==
- Sebastian Breaks as John Carter
- Virginia Wetherell as Karen
- Jack Allen as Hornsby-Smith
- Derek Aylward as Karl Mendez
- Erika Raffael as Samantha
- Douglas Blackwell as Bruno Miglio
- Julie Shaw as Cathy
- Jane Howard as Jane
- Roy Sone as Al
- Nicholas Hawtrey as Gerry
- Brian Weske as Mike
- Gilly Grant as Sally
- Desmond Cullum-Jones as Chief Inspector
- Tracey Yorke as 1st stripper
- Lena Ellis as 2nd stripper

== Production ==
The film was shot on location in Brighton.

== Critical reception ==
The Monthly Film Bulletin said "The emphasis in this irrelevantly titled farrago soon shifts from sex to violence, with the titillatory promise of the opening scenes unfulfilled by the conventional and unconvincing thriller that follows. Still, the deserted ghost train on Brighton Pier makes an effective background for the climactic chase in the snow, and the Soho sequences have a realistically seedy atmosphere."

David McGillivray wrote in Doing Rude Things: "Strip Poker, written between 7pm one night and 2am the following morning, is a crude gangster melodrama with bursts of unappetising nudity. The strip poker of the title is only in the foreign version, The Big Switch."
