= Vintage clothing =

Garments originating from a previous era

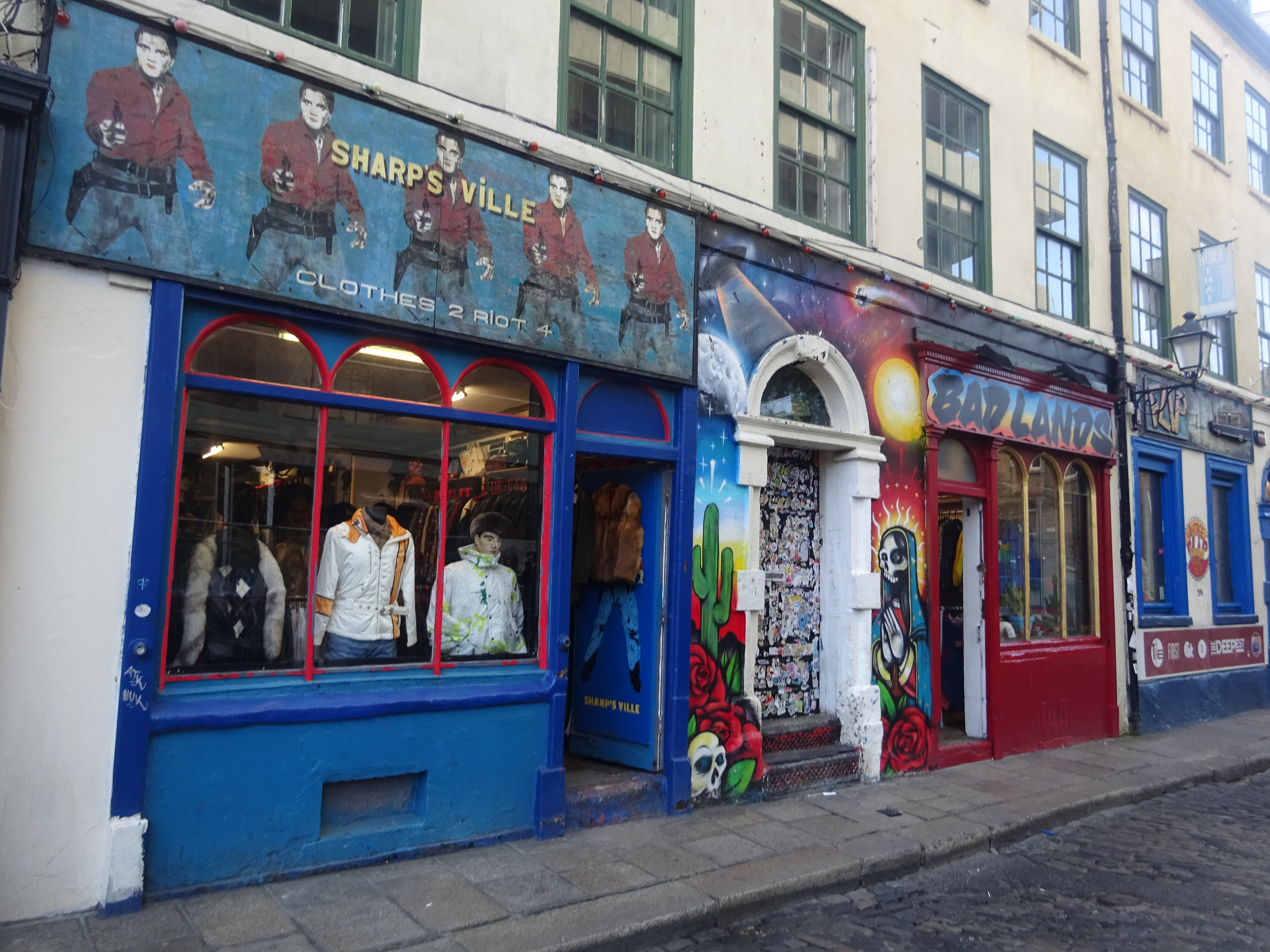
Vintage clothing shops, Dublin, Ireland

Vintage clothing is clothing that originates from a previous era. The term vintage clothing can also be applied in reference to second-hand retail outlets, e.g. in "vintage clothing store". The concept originated during World War I as a response to textile shortages. Vintage dressing encompasses choosing accessories, mixing vintage garments with new, as well as creating an ensemble of various styles and periods. Vintage clothes typically sell at low prices for high-end name brands.

Vintage clothing can be found in cities at local boutiques or local charities, or on the internet through digital second-hand shopping websites. Vintage fashion has seen a reemergence in popularity within the 21st century due to increased prevalence of vintage pieces in the media and among celebrities, as well as consumer interests in sustainability and slow fashion.

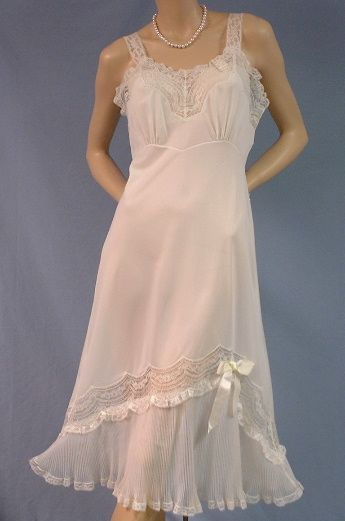
1950s bridal vintage slip

== Definitions ==
"Vintage" is a colloquialism commonly used to refer to all old styles of clothing. A generally accepted industry standard is that items made between 30 and 100 years ago are considered "vintage" if they clearly reflect the styles and trends of the era they represent. These clothing items come with a sense of history attached to them, which is one of the reasons they are valued by vintage enthusiasts. This sense of history allows consumers to express sentimental nostalgia for fashions of past eras and for aspects not common with modern items like craftsmanship. Vintage items are considered different than antique, which is used to refer to items 100 years old or more. Retro, short for retrospective, or "vintage style," usually refers to clothing that imitates the style of a previous era. Reproduction, or repro, clothing is a newly made copy of an older garment.

Clothing produced more recently is usually called modern or contemporary fashion.

=== Deadstock ===
Deadstock refers to merchandise that was withdrawn from sale and warehoused without having been sold to a customer. This is due to the item no longer being in fashion or otherwise outdated or superseded. Such merchandise might once again be in demand and at such point can be returned to sale. Return to sale of fashion merchandise would make it vintage clothing. However, repurposing of deadstock in new products is one way to improve sustainability in the fashion industry.

== Sizing ==
In the United States, due to changes in clothing sizes, vintage sizes are often smaller than the corresponding contemporary size. For example, a garment from the 1970s labeled as Medium (M) might be similar in size to a 2010s Extra Small (XS). Vintage sewing patterns offer an option for those who want a historically accurate garment but cannot find one in their size.

== Retail market ==
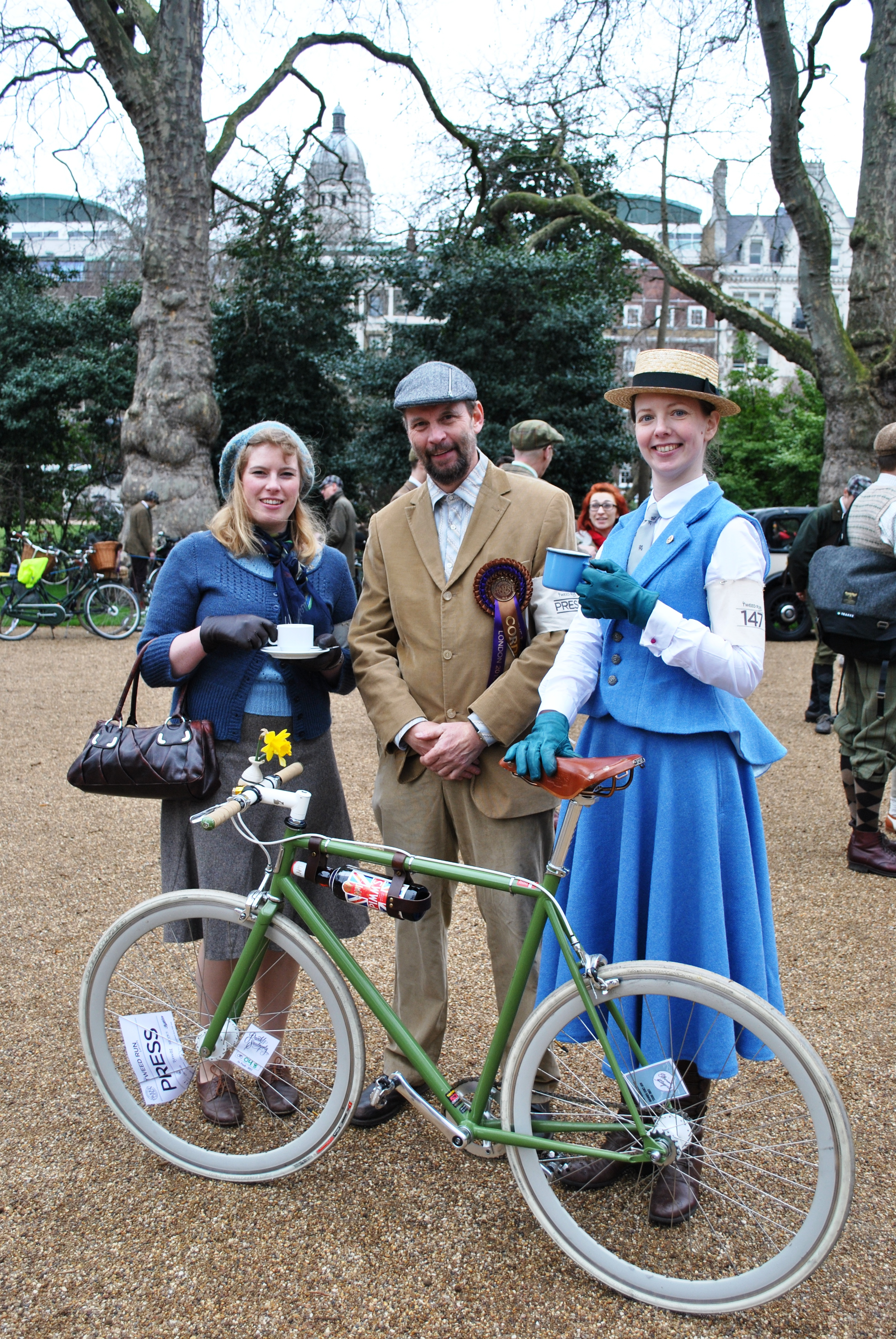
Vintage Edwardian-inspired fashion

Popular places to buy vintage clothing include charity-run second-hand clothing shops, thrift stores, consignment shops, garage sales, car boot sales, flea markets, antique markets, estate sales, auctions, vintage clothing shops and vintage fashion, textile or collectables fairs. Specialist vintage clothing shops, such as Virginia by Virginia Bates in London, often attracted high-end customers.

With the rise of the digital world and social media, the consumption of Vintage clothing has rapidly expanded, with e-commerce websites leading to growth in consumer accessibility of vintage pieces. The internet has drastically increased the availability of specific and hard-to-get items and opened up prospective markets for sellers around the world. In the last 20 years, social media in particular has become the most popular medium for consumers to obtain information about, and interact with vintage fashion.

Popular places to acquire garments include online auctions, multi-vendor sites, online vintage clothing shops, specialist forums, and social media sites, where consumers can like, share, and purchase vintage goods from their smartphones. Many vintage clothing shops with physical locations also sell their goods online. In a world filled with fast fashion and "new" being the most popular choice, vintage style has found a way to stay popular. This has a lot to do with celebrities and influencers following this trend, making it a desirable choice for the general public as well. Famous brands, such as Gucci, have made choices like cutting down the number of yearly fashion shows, in order to move the fashion industry toward greater sustainability. The seasonal fashion cycle that the industry has followed for years is being broken down to favor a more environmentally conscious approach to fashion.

Typically in the United States, vintage clothing shops can be found clustered in college towns and artsy neighborhoods of cities. In contrast to thrift stores that sell both vintage and contemporary used clothing, vintage clothing shops are usually for-profit enterprises, with the market mixed between small chains and independent stores. These stores typically range from 200 to 5,000 square feet in size, and will usually have a fitting room. Vintage clothing stores may obtain clothing from individuals in exchange for cash or store credit.

== History ==
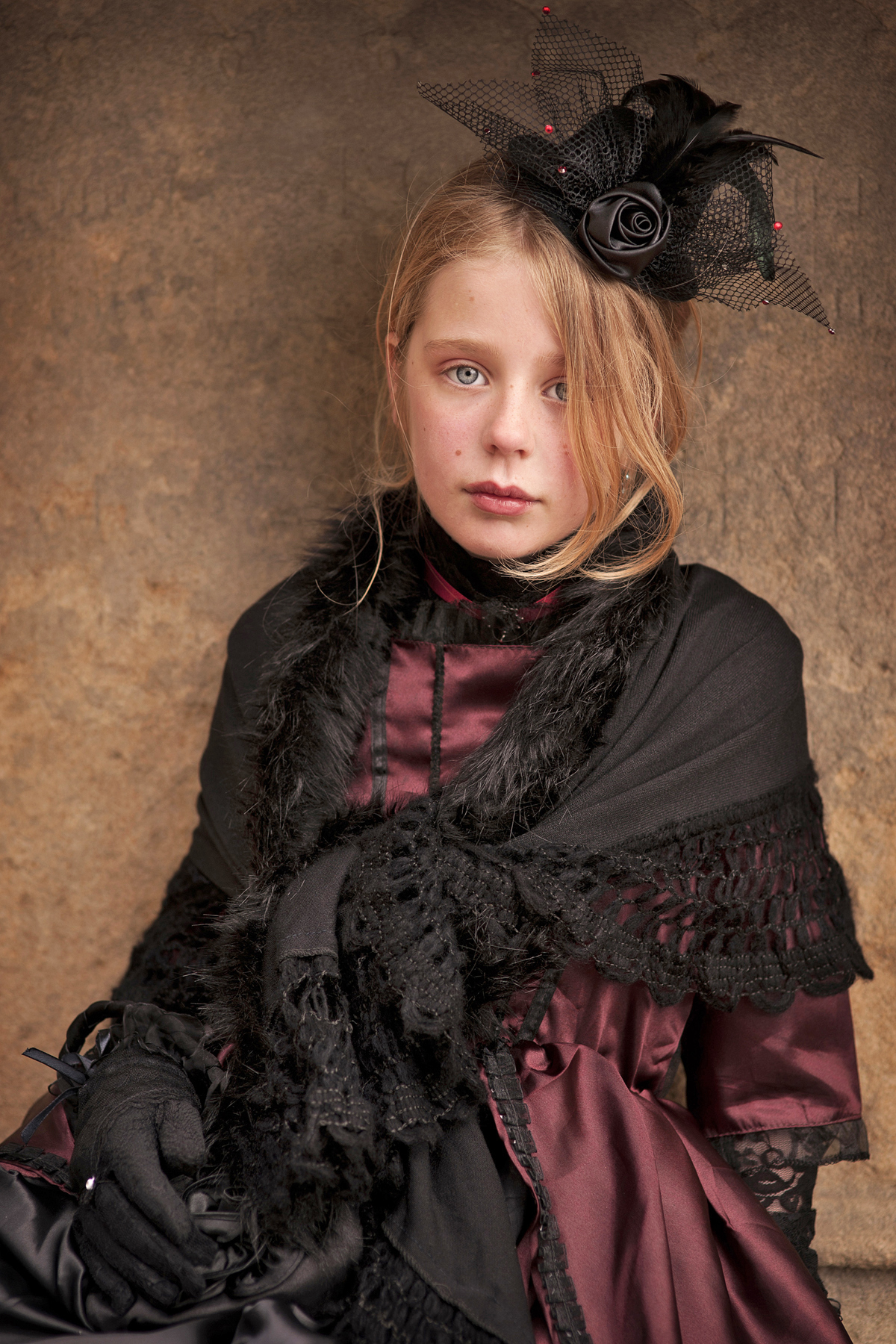
A girl wearing Victorian-inspired fashion

Before the rise of industrial manufacture, construction of most articles of clothing required extensive hand labor. Clothing worn by farmers and laborers was more a matter of practicality than fashion. In order to maximize value, clothing was repaired when worn or damaged, sometimes with layers of patching. Used clothing, in reasonable condition, could be tailored for a new owner. When too tattered to repair, an article might have been taken down to scraps for use in a quilt or braided rag rug, or used as rags for cleaning or dusting.

During World War I, the United States launched a conservation campaign, with slogans such as "Make economy fashionable lest it become obligatory". One result was an approximate 10% reduction in wartime trash production.

Into the 20th and 21st centuries, vintage clothing has seen increased popularity throughout media and pop culture. The tides of popular fashion create demand for ongoing replacement of products with something that is new and fresh. What was once known as secondhand clothing is now seen as vintage clothing. This is due in part to increased visibility through media, film and television, and celebrity influence. In the past 20 years, vintage fashion has been featured in leading fashion and lifestyle magazines, including a 2011 publication of Marie Claire. The popularity of period pieces within film and television has also contributed to trends of vintage fashion. The authentic portrayal of 1960s fashions in the 2007 award winning series Mad Men sparked a resurgence of glamour in consumer interest. This was reflected in a prevalence of 1950 and 60s fashions in 2010 runways, and increased sales at vintage shops. In the early 2000s, celebrities like Reese Witherspoon and Renee Zellweger brought vintage clothing into the media by wearing vintage pieces to red carpets.

In the past decade, vintage clothing has become part of the movement towards environmental sustainability and sustainable fashion, and is an aspect of slow fashion, a concept coined in 2007 by Kate Fletcher. Vintage fashion appeals to consumer interests of ethical clothing as it falls under categories of reusing, recycling and repairing items rather than throwing them away. Vintage shopping became a sustainable option with celebrities such as Kim Kardashian popularizing the trend. Vintage shopping has become an alternative to fast fashion.

Vintage shopping trends have also seen a transition to E-commerce. When new retailers try to enter the market for vintage clothing, they face barriers unique to this segment of the fashion industry. For example, authenticity and exclusivity are two very important factors that vintage clothing consumers look for, so guaranteeing these qualities is of greatest importance for the retailers. Knowing and disclosing the origin of the clothing is a crucial component of succeeding in the vintage clothing retail industry.

Those who purchase vintage clothes may wear them frequently or use them as showpieces of great value within their wardrobe. These tend to never be worn, rather appreciated from their new home in the owner's closet. While some people may keep these clothes in their possession for a long time, others may look to repurpose, mend, or pass these items to new owners.

Historically based sub-cultural groups like rockabilly and swing dancing played a part in the increased interest in vintage clothes. In Finland the vintage scene resulted in a registered non-profit organization called Fintage, from common interest in the preservation of material culture and the environment.

== "Vintage inspired" and "vintage style" ==
Fashion design throughout history has turned to previous eras for inspiration. Vintage clothing retains and increases in value due to the fact that it is genuinely from a past era. Vintage clothing allows the buyers to be their own designers because they can choose the different styles from second-hand clothing. In addition, authentic garments are made one at a time, with enough attention to detail to create an item that has long lasting value. Garments closely resembling original vintage (retro or antique) clothing are mass-produced, for the most part, in China. An example of this is the simple slip dresses that emerged in the early 1990s, a style that resembles a 1930s design, but upon examination will show that it only superficially resembles the real thing. These styles are generally referred to as "vintage style", "vintage inspired" or "vintage reproductions". They serve as a convenient alternative to those who admire an old style but prefer a modern interpretation. People who wear vintage clothing look for designer brands and limited edition products to fit in the "vintage" category. Sellers claim consumer advantage in that, unlike the original garments, they are usually available in a range of sizes and perhaps, colours and/or fabrics, and can be sold much cheaper.

Vintage fashion can be understood as a response to fast fashion, in which garments are mass produced. Vintage shopping allows consumers to find unique pieces and create a sense of individuality. Vintage clothing is also meant to evoke an emotional connection to clothing, especially connecting pieces with feelings such as nostalgia and memories. The individuality and sense of style that a person tries to convey by building a wardrobe around "vintage style" is something that drives the trend forward.

Luxury clothing consumers have shifted towards a more sustainable approach to luxury fashion, with vintage clothing contributing to this trend. Influencers and celebrities have increasingly gravitated towards branded second-hand or vintage items. Consumers have also shown a preference for unique pieces that are more environmentally friendly than cheaper fast-fashion alternatives. The growing recognition of vintage clothing in society and fashion has contributed to its desirability among consumers. It has also helped establish brand desirability in a market where this component may previously have been less prominent. For members of the general public with more limited budgets than celebrities, second-hand luxury items can provide an appealing entry point into the market for luxury brands.

== Environmental sustainability ==
Vintage fashion is part of a larger movement of sustainable fashion, and falls under the category of slow fashion, which is a direct response to increasing awareness of the environmental impacts of the fast fashion industry. Within the past 10 years, increased media coverage of environmental issues has led to increasing consumer interest in ethical clothing consumption, and vintage fashion specifically.

The fashion industry ranks as the second most polluting industry in the world after the oil industry. Consequently, a trend in becoming a conscious and sustainable shopper has emerged through the years. The interest and demand in vintage shopping has grown significantly. The rise of popularity of vintage clothing has been linked to a growing demand for sustainable fashion. Vintage clothing gained traction in 2020 as consumers became eco-conscious. In 2020, the term "vintage fashion" was researched 35,000 times on Lyst. One way of reducing waste and limiting the negative impact of fashion on the environment is the reuse and recycling of clothes. Vintage stores make fashion more sustainable according to a ThredUp report, one used item purchased as opposed to one new item reduces CO_{2} emissions by 25% on average per use.

== See also ==
- Vintage (design)
- Thrift store chic
- Indie subculture
- Counterculture
- 2010s fashion
- Sustainable fashion

== Bibliography ==
- Bamford, Trudie (2003). Viva Vintage: Find it, Wear it, Love it. Carroll & Brown. ISBN 1-903258-73-1
- Tolkien, Tracy (2000). Vintage: the Art of Dressing up. Pavilion. ISBN 1-86205-305-7
