= Martine Beswick =

English actress and model (born 1941)

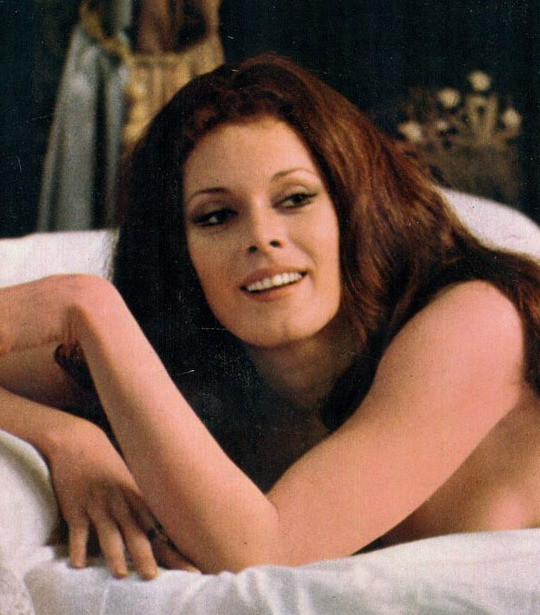
- Beswick in The Kiss (1974)
- Born: Mary Rose Penso Beswick; 26 September 1941 (age 85); Port Antonio, Portland, Colony of Jamaica
- Other name: Martine Beswicke
- Occupations: Actress; model
- Years active: 1962–1995; 2016–present
- Known for: From Russia with Love (1963); Thunderball (1965); One Million Years B.C. (1966); A Bullet for the General (1966)
- Spouse: John Richardson (m. 1967; div. 1973)
- Awards: Rondo Hatton Classic Horror Award

Mary Rose Penso Beswick (born 26 September 1941) is a Jamaican-born British actress and model perhaps best known for her roles in two James Bond films, From Russia with Love (1963) and Thunderball (1965), who went on to appear in several other notable films in the 1960s. In 2019, she was inducted into the Rondo Hatton Classic Horror Awards' Monster Kid Hall of Fame.

== Early years ==
Mary Rose Penso Beswick was born on 26 September 1941 in Port Antonio, Jamaica, to Ronald Stuart Davis Beswick, a British father and Myrtle May (née Penso, 1912–2017) a Portuguese-Jamaican mother. Beswick, her sister Laurellie (1943–2002) and her mother moved to London in 1954 following the separation of her parents. In 1955, she left high school to work to help support her family.

== Film career ==
Beswick is best known for her two appearances in the James Bond film series. Although she auditioned for the first Bond film Dr. No (1962), she was cast in the second film From Russia with Love (1963) as the fiery gypsy girl, Zora. She engaged in a "catfight" scene with her rival Vida (played by former Miss Israel Aliza Gur). Beswick later stated that there was as much bad feeling with Gur offscreen as on, with the film's director, Terence Young, encouraging Beswick to get rough with Gur.

I was a very nice girl but Aliza was a cow. We had terrible clashes and I was disgusted with her. I had a lot of anger inside of me so that [fight] scene was a perfect way to work it out. We rehearsed the fight for three weeks but when we shot it, Aliza was really fighting. Everyone encouraged me to fight back, so I did. We got into a real scrapping match. — Martine Beswick

She was incorrectly billed as "Martin Beswick" in the title sequence. Beswick then appeared as the ill-fated Paula Caplan in Thunderball (1965). She had been away from the Caribbean so long that she was required to sunbathe constantly for two weeks before filming, to look like a local.

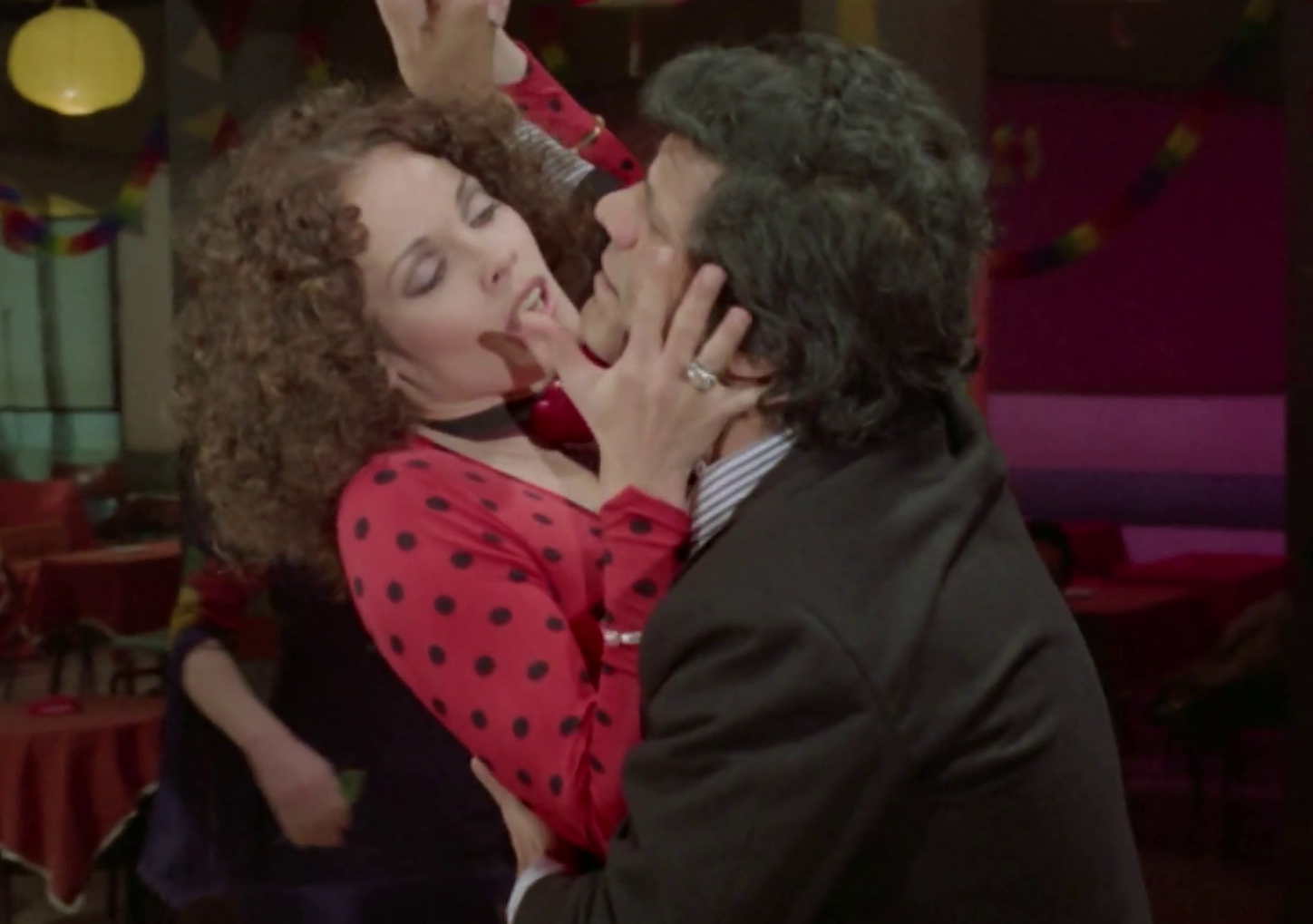
Beswick with Franco Franchi in The Last Italian Tango (1973)

Beswick went on to appear in One Million Years B.C. (1966) opposite Raquel Welch, with whom she also engaged in a catfight. She played Adelita in the well-regarded Spaghetti Western, A Bullet for the General (1966) opposite Klaus Kinski and Gian Maria Volonté and played a villainous role in the exploitation thriller The Penthouse (1967). She then appeared in various Hammer Studio low-budget films, most notably Prehistoric Women (1967) (aka Slave Girls of the White Rhinoceros) and the gender-bending horror Dr. Jekyll and Sister Hyde (1971), in which she played the titular villainess. She had a supporting role in the Italian sex comedy The Last Italian Tango (1973). She then starred as the Queen of Evil in Oliver Stone's 1974 directorial debut Seizure, or Queen of Evil. In the 1970s, Beswick moved to Hollywood and regularly appeared on both the big and small screens. She made numerous guest appearances on television series, including Sledge Hammer!, Fantasy Island, The Fall Guy, Mannix, The Six Million Dollar Man and Falcon Crest. In 1980, she played the lead role in the comedy film The Happy Hooker Goes Hollywood.

Beswick's career was active into the 1990s. Since then, she has mainly participated in film documentaries, providing commentary and relating her experiences on the many films in which she has appeared. She owned a removals business in London, but is now semiretired except for her guest appearances at international Bond conventions. In April 2013, she was one of 12 Bond Girl celebrity guests in an episode of the BBC's Masterchef. Beginning with Melvin and Howard (1980), she changed the spelling of her last name to "Beswicke", but reverted to her original surname in the mid-1990s; her last credit with the longer spelling is Wide Sargasso Sea (1993). After a 24-year absence from the screen, Beswick came out of retirement in 2018 to appear in House of the Gorgon opposite fellow Hammer film actors Caroline Munro, Veronica Carlson, and Christopher Neame.

== Filmography ==
=== Film ===
Year	Title	Role	Notes
1963	From Russia with Love	Zora	
1964	Saturday Night Out	Barmaid	
1965	Thunderball	Paula Caplan	
1966	One Million Years B.C.	Nupondi	
1967	John the Bastard	Dona Antonia	
1967	Prehistoric Women	Queen Kari	
1967	The Penthouse	Harry	
1967	A Bullet for the General	Adelita	
1971	Dr. Jekyll and Sister Hyde	Edwina Hyde	
1973	The Last Italian Tango	Giovanna	
1974	Seizure	Queen of Evil	
1974	The Kiss	Nara Kotosky	
1975	Strange New World	Tana	
1978	Devil Dog: The Hound of Hell	Red Haired Lady	
1980	The Happy Hooker Goes Hollywood	Xaviera Hollander	
1980	Melvin and Howard	Realty Agent	
1983	Balboa	Narrator	
1987	Cyclone	Waters	
1987	From a Whisper to a Scream	Katherine White	
1990	Miami Blues	Noira	
1990	Evil Spirits	Vanya	
1991	Trancers II	Nurse Trotter	
1992	Life on the Edge	Linda James	
1992	Critters 4	Angela	Voice
1993	Wide Sargasso Sea	Aunt Cora	
1995	Night of the Scarecrow	Barbara	
1995	Magic Island	Lady Face	Voice
2016	Sinbad and the Pirate Princess	Queen Badra	Voice
2019	House of the Gorgon	Euryale	
2021	Cowgirls vs Pterodactyls	Narrator	
2022	Saturnalia	The Voice	

=== Television ===
Year	Title	Role
1965	Danger Man	Girl
1967	The Solarnauts (pilot)	Kandia
1969	It Takes a Thief	Christine Leland
1970	Mannix	Eve Brady
1971	Longstreet	Nikki Bell
1971	Night Gallery	Susan Davis
1975	Switch	Veronique
1976	City of Angels	Hannah Bach
1976	The Six Million Dollar Man	Julia Flood
1977	Baretta	Belly Dancer
1977	Aspen	Joan Carolinian
1980	Hart to Hart	Ruby Braff
1981	Quincy, M.E.	Hanna Weiss
1982	Cassie & Co.	Valerie Dennis
1982	The Fall Guy	Countess Vitt
1983	The Powers of Matthew Star	Katya
1984	Fantasy Island	Giselle Corday
1984	Days of Our Lives	Abigail Abernathy
1985	Cover Up	Melissa
1985	Falcon Crest	Pamela Lynch
1987	Sledge Hammer!	Lana
