= Barrie Gosney =

British actor (1926–2008)

Barrie Gosney (1926, Surrey – 24 January 2008) was a British television, film and theatrical actor.

In a career spanning five decades, Gosney played roles in Up Pompeii, Last of the Summer Wine, Believe Nothing, Time Gentlemen Please, Keeping Up Appearances and Harry Hill.

He is perhaps best remembered for his performances in Harry Hill's show in which he filled the role of an absurd type of continuity announcer and the character Ken Ford ("the man from 'The Joy of Sex' books..."). He would often send himself up and perform surreal impressions of various celebrities, including Barbra Streisand, Joan Collins and Cliff Richard. Gosney was a member of the Grand Order of Water Rats.

He died on 24 January 2008 after complications resulting from a fall. An episode of Al Murray's Happy Hour broadcast on ITV1 on 15 February 2008 was dedicated to him.

== Selected filmography ==
- Carry On Jack (1963) – Coach Driver
- A Home of Your Own (1964)
- San Ferry Ann (1965) – Mini Dad
- Three Hats for Lisa (1965) – Reporter
- Futtocks End (1970)
- Up Pompeii (1971) – Major Domo
- Up the Chastity Belt (1971) – Meat Stall Holder
- Up the Front (1972) – Stage Manager
- Raising the Roof (1972) – Robbins
- Our Miss Fred (1972) – Bertie
- Don't Just Lie There, Say Something! (1974) – Police sergeant
- Are You Being Served? (1977) – Airport Security Guard (uncredited)
- Keeping Up Appearances (1992) – the Yokel
- Harry Hill (1997–2000) 17 episodes - various characters
- Time Gentlemen Please (2000–2002) 13 episodes - Uncle Barrie
