= Arnold Diamond =

British actor (1915–1992)

- Arnold Diamond in The Saint (1963)
- Born: 18 April 1915; West Ham, Essex, England
- Died: 18 March 1992 (aged 76); Poole, Dorset, England
- Education: RADA
- Occupation: Actor

Arnold Diamond (18 April 1915 – 18 March 1992) was an English character actor, regularly cast in small parts on television such as in The Avengers 1967 episode entitled Who's Who when he played Krelmar.

He graduated from RADA in 1936, and his stage work included the RSC, and three years in Agatha Christie's The Mousetrap in the West End (1954-1957). In a long career, he was cast in a variety of roles, but frequently in 'foreigner' roles, and often as policemen. Indeed, his most remembered role is probably that of Colonel Latignant in the 1960s ITC series The Saint with Roger Moore. The character of Latignant was one of the few recurring characters in the series' long run.

Towards the end of his career he appeared in the BBC comedy series In Sickness and in Health as Mr Rabinsky, Alf Garnett's Jewish tight neighbour with a black hat and long beard.

== Selected filmography ==
- Snowbound (1948) - Italian Hotel Guest (uncredited)
- The Spider and the Fly (1949) - Police Officer (uncredited)
- Nineteen Eighty-Four (1949) - Emmanuel Goldstein
- Cairo Road (1950) - Police Major
- Circle of Danger (1951) - Geronimo's Waiter (uncredited)
- Mantrap (1953) - Alphonse
- South of Algiers (1953) - Spahi Officer
- Forbidden Cargo (1954) - French Customs Officer (uncredited)
- Five Days (1954) - Perkins (uncredited)
- The Constant Husband (1955) - Car Loan Manager (uncredited)
- Othello (1956) - Iago (English version, voice)
- The Hideout (1956) - Zacki
- Time Without Pity (1957) - Third Journalist
- Don Quixote (1957) - Don Quixote (English version, voice, uncredited)
- The Duke Wore Jeans (1958) - MC
- Dunkirk (1958) - Constable (uncredited)
- The Revenge of Frankenstein (1958) - Molke
- Carry On Sergeant (1958) - Fifth Specialist
- Bobbikins (1959) - LeFarge
- Hand in Hand (1960) - Mr. Mathias
- Carry On Constable (1960) - Chief Constable (voice, uncredited)
- The Hands of Orlac (1960) - Dresser (uncredited)
- The Man Who Was Nobody (1960) - Eddie
- The Breaking Point (1961) - Telling
- The Frightened City (1961) - Moffat
- It's Trad, Dad! (1962) - TV Panelist
- Two Letter Alibi (1962) - Ballistics Expert
- Masters of Venus (1962) - Imos
- The Switch (1963) - Jean Lecraze
- Paranoiac (1963) - Publican
- Maniac (1963) - Janiello
- Return from the Ashes (1965) - Neighbour
- A Man Could Get Killed (1966) - Milo
- The Spy with a Cold Nose (1966) - Agent in Water Wagon
- The Vulture (1966) - (uncredited)
- Casino Royale (1967) - Russian Officer (uncredited)
- The Anniversary (1968) - Headwaiter
- The Girl on a Motorcycle (1968) - French Customs Officer
- Isadora (1968) - (uncredited)
- The File of the Golden Goose (1969) - Pollard
- The Best House in London (1969) - Charles Dickens
- The Italian Job (1969) - Senior Computer Room Official
- Run a Crooked Mile (1969, TV Movie) - Swiss News Agent
- Doppelgänger (1969) - Paris EuroSEC Representative (uncredited)
- All the Way Up (1970) - Manager 'Bella Capri'
- Zeppelin (1971) - Major Proudfoot
- Puppet on a Chain (1971) - Coroner (uncredited)
- Fiddler on the Roof (1971) - Moishe
- Madame Sin (1972) - Lengetti
- Young Winston (1972) - Officer (uncredited)
- The Alf Garnett Saga (1972) - Policeman
- Our Miss Fred (1972) - German C.O.
- Steptoe and Son (1973) - 'The Party' Christmas Special
- Don't Just Lie There, Say Something! (1974) - Priest
- The Bawdy Adventures of Tom Jones (1976) - Noisy Reveller
- March or Die (1977) - Husband
- Revenge of the Pink Panther (1978) - Douvier's Board member
- Quincy's Quest (1979) - Manager
- The Great Riviera Bank Robbery (1979) - Town Hall Man
- Avalanche Express (1979) - (uncredited)
- Omen III: The Final Conflict (1981) - Astronomer
- Venom (1981) - Head Waiter
- Anastasia: The Mystery of Anna (1986) - Dr. Markov
