= Sid Colin =

English scriptwriter (1915–1989)

- Born: Sidney Coblentz; 31 August 1915; Islington, London, England
- Died: 12 December 1989 (aged 74); London, England
- Occupation: Scriptwriter
- Writing career
- Period: 1930s–1982
- Genres: Television, cinema, radio
- Notable works: How Do You View? (1949–1953); The Army Game (1957–1961); Living It Up (1957–1958); Up Pompeii! (1969–1970); On the House (1970–1971); Whoops Baghdad (1973)

Sid Colin (born Sidney Coblentz; 31 August 1915 – 12 December 1989) was an English scriptwriter, working for radio, television and the cinema. He is best remembered for creating the television comedy The Army Game (1957–1959) and writing for Up Pompeii! (1969–1970), as well as films including Carry On Spying and Percy's Progress. He occasionally collaborated with regular Carry On series writer Talbot Rothwell. Earlier in his career, he was a musician and occasional lyricist.

== Biography ==
Colin was born in Islington, London; his father Benjamin Coblentz was a Jewish immigrant from Vilnius in the Russian Empire, who worked in the fur trade. Colin learned guitar and became a jazz fan.

After becoming an accomplished guitarist in the style of Django Reinhardt, he left school and joined Ambrose and his Orchestra. As well as playing with the band in theatres and on radio broadcasts, Colin became known for interposing one-liner jokes and wisecracks in the style of Groucho Marx. In 1938, he was approached by musician and radio producer John Burnaby to join the comedy band Sid Millward and His Nitwits for their new BBC radio series. Colin wrote material for the show, and was described in the Radio Times as "Muddler of Ceremonies".

After the start of the Second World War, Colin and other members of Ambrose's orchestra formed the Heralds of Swing, and then The Squadronaires (officially the RAF Dance Orchestra). They toured extensively with ENSA, and Colin wrote the lyrics to the song "If I Only Had Wings", composed by Ronnie Aldrich and recorded by Geraldo and his orchestra, which became an RAF anthem during the war and was later recorded by Vera Lynn. In 1944, the Squadronaires were commissioned to provide music for the film Starlight Serenade, and Colin became one of the film script's co-writers.

In 1946, Colin was about to get married, did not want to continue touring, and was unwilling to make the fashionable change from acoustic to electric guitar. He returned to the BBC, and contributed scripts to such shows as The Show Must Go On!. He became head writer on an established show, Navy Mixture, where he introduced new characters voiced by Jon Pertwee and Jimmy Edwards, among others. He also wrote for the panel show Ignorance Is Bliss, for which Sid Millward's Nitwits supplied the music, and then joined the writing team led by Frank Muir and Denis Norden for the show Starlight Hour. The show's producer, Roy Speer, then hired Colin to work with Eric Sykes on ventriloquist Peter Brough's show, Educating Archie.

Colin moved into television comedy scriptwriting in the early 1950s, on Don't Look Now, featuring Alfred Marks, followed by the very successful How Do You View?, starring Terry-Thomas, on which Colin worked with co-writer Talbot Rothwell. He was then given free rein on a series starring Avril Angers, Friends and Neighbours, followed by the sitcom Dear Dotty in 1954, but neither was successful and Colin returned to radio work. He wrote Top of the Town for Terry-Thomas, and Shout for Joy! for Joy Nichols. He returned to television to work on Arthur Askey's Living It Up, and The Ted Ray Show, and then wrote links and monologues for The Jimmy Wheeler Show.

In 1957, Colin created the sitcom The Army Game for Granada Television. The series, featuring William Hartnell, Alfie Bass, Bill Fraser and many others, was highly successful, running to 154 episodes in four series; Colin wrote 38 of the episodes. He also wrote the series' film spin-off, I Only Arsked!, starring Bernard Bresslaw, and several other films in the same year including Tommy the Toreador starring Tommy Steele, and The Navy Lark, based on the successful radio series. In 1960 he wrote the television series Meet the Champ, also starring Bresslaw.

Colin started a four-year break from scriptwriting work in 1960, which it has been suggested may have been because of exhaustion combined with resentment at apparent plagiarism of some of his work. He returned in 1964, co-writing (with Talbot Rothwell) the script for Carry On Spying, and also creating two television shows, How To Be An Alien starring Frank Muir and Denis Norden, and HMS Paradise starring Frank Thornton. In 1968, he was appointed Head of Light Entertainment at Yorkshire Television, staying there for five years and giving comedian Les Dawson his first series of programmes.

In 1970 he reunited with former writing partner Talbot Rothwell on the second series of Up Pompeii!, contributing monologues and wisecracks. He continued to work with the show's star, Frankie Howerd, on the spin-off films Up Pompeii, Up the Chastity Belt , and Up the Front, and finally the poorly-received sitcom Whoops Baghdad (1973). In 1974, he co-wrote the film Percy's Progress with Harry H. Corbett and Ian La Frenais. Colin also continued as a staff writer for both the BBC and ITV, contributing on such shows as Love Thy Neighbour.

In 1977, he wrote the six-part television series And the Bands Played On, and accompanying book, an anecdotal history of pre-war English dance bands.

Colin died in 1989, aged 74.

== Selected filmography ==
- Golden Arrow (1949)
