= A Funny Thing Happened on the Way to the Forum (film) =

1966 musical film directed by Richard Lester

- Theatrical release poster
- Directed by: Richard Lester
- Screenplay by: Melvin Frank; Michael Pertwee
- Based on: A Funny Thing Happened on the Way to the Forum (1962 musical) by Burt Shevelove; Larry Gelbart
- Produced by: Melvin Frank
- Starring: Zero Mostel; Jack Gilford; Phil Silvers; Buster Keaton; Michael Crawford; Michael Hordern
- Cinematography: Nicolas Roeg
- Edited by: John Victor-Smith
- Music by: Stephen Sondheim (songs); Ken Thorne (adaptation)
- Distributed by: United Artists
- Release dates: October 16, 1966 (New York City, premiere); December 14, 1966 (UK); January 1967 (US)
- Running time: 99 minutes
- Countries: United States; United Kingdom
- Language: English
- Budget: $2 million
- Box office: $3.4 million (US/Canada)

A Funny Thing Happened on the Way to the Forum is a 1966 period musical comedy film directed by Richard Lester, based on the stage musical with music and lyrics by Stephen Sondheim, and book by Burt Shevelove and Larry Gelbart. It stars Zero Mostel and Jack Gilford, reprising their roles from the Broadway stage production. It also features Buster Keaton in his final screen role; Phil Silvers, for whom the stage musical was originally intended; and regular Lester collaborators Michael Crawford, Michael Hordern, and Roy Kinnear.

The film was adapted for the screen by Melvin Frank and Michael Pertwee. The story is inspired by the farces of the ancient Roman playwright Plautus (251–183 BC) – specifically Pseudolus, Miles Gloriosus, and Mostellaria – and tells the bawdy story of a slave named Pseudolus (Mostel) and his attempts to win his freedom by helping his young master woo the girl next door.

The film was released by United Artists on October 16, 1966, and was a critical and commercial success. It was nominated for Best Motion Picture – Musical or Comedy at the 24th Golden Globe Awards, while Ken Thorne won an Oscar for Best Music, Scoring of Music, Adaptation or Treatment.

== Plot ==
In the city of Rome during the reign of Emperor Nero, Pseudolus is "the lyingest, cheatingest, sloppiest slave in all of Rome", whose only wish is to buy his freedom from his master's parents, the henpecked Senex and his overbearing wife, Domina. Pseudolus finds out his master, Senex's handsome but dim son, Hero, has fallen in love with the winsome Philia (destined to be a courtesan) from the house next door of Marcus Lycus, a slave trader. Pseudolus makes a deal: he will get the girl for Hero in return for his freedom.

First, Pseudolus attempts the direct approach: posing as a newly freed Roman citizen to purchase Philia for the underage Hero, who cannot legally purchase her. While being presented with the available merchandise by the slave trader Marcus Lycus, Pseudolus fancies Gymnasia, a silent Amazonian courtesan. However, Philia, the virgin, has been sold to the great Roman soldier Miles Gloriosus, who even now is on his way from conquering Crete to claim her as his bride. Pseudolus comes up with a plan to fool the slave trader into giving Philia to Hero and to possibly get Gymnasia for himself. Pseudolus convinces Marcus Lycus that Philia, who comes from Crete, has been exposed to a deadly plague in Crete and must be isolated from the other slaves (in Hero's custody) at the house of Senex, who is presently away with his wife Domina.

Wary of Gloriosus' fearsome temper (he once before sold Gloriosus a “bum virgin”), Marcus Lycus plays into Pseudolus's devious hands when Marcus Lycus “tricks” Pseudolus into impersonating him and breaking the bad news to Gloriosus. Gloriosus would be heartbroken at his bride's death, but unable to blame Marcus Lycus for a plague caught in Crete. Meanwhile, Gloriosus has arrived to claim Philia and must be distracted with an orgy until he can be presented with a facsimile of Philia. Pseudolus blackmails his slave overseer Hysterium (whose collection of pornographic pottery would shock his prudish owner, Domina) into masquerading in drag as the “dead” Philia. Things go wrong at every turn. Meanwhile, Hero's parents, Senex and Domina, have returned home to add to the chaos. Senex mistakes Philia as a gift for him when Philia mistakes Senex for Gloriosus and dutifully presents herself to him (she is an "honest virgin") while confessing her love for Hero. The “prudish” Domina has unrealistic designs on a fling with the handsome Gloriosus, who finds her repulsive and mistakes Domina for the madam of a house of prostitution. Domina has brought back a hefty “breeder slave”—who has already borne 18 babies—as a mate for Pseudolus, who must elude her lustful attempts to entrap him while scheming for Gymnasia and Philia.

Presented with the "dead" Philia, the great Gloriosus accepts the death of his intended bride without rage, but he announces his intention of cutting "her" heart out as a memorial. Alarmed, the supposedly dead "Philia" comes back to life, and a chase ensues across Rome and into the countryside, with Pseudolus helping himself to Gymnasia. Eventually, Miles Gloriosus collars Hero, the real Philia, Hysterium, Marcus Lycus, Pseudolus, and Gymnasia and brings them back to Rome to untangle the skein of deception and see justice is done.

Also arriving on the scene, after over a 20-year absence, is their neighbor Erronius, who has been seeking his son and daughter who were kidnapped as babies by pirates. Seeing that both Gloriosus and Philia are wearing identical rings with a “gaggle of geese” motif, Erronius claims them both as his long-lost children, meaning that they are brother and sister. Thus, Marcus Lycus is spared from execution for breaking the contract for Philia. Hero gets Philia, now a free woman of patrician class; Miles Gloriosus takes voluptuous Gemini twins as his concubines, provided by Marcus Lycus in compensation for Philia; and Pseudolus gets his freedom, the Amazonian Gymnasia to be his wife, and a dowry of 10,000 minae, also compliments of Marcus Lycus.

== Cast ==
- Zero Mostel as Pseudolus
- Phil Silvers as Marcus Lycus
- Buster Keaton as Erronius
- Jack Gilford as Hysterium
- Michael Crawford as Hero
- Michael Hordern as Senex
- Annette Andre as Philia
- Patricia Jessel as Domina
- Leon Greene as Captain Miles Gloriosus
- Pamela Brown as High Priestess
- Inga Neilsen as Gymnasia
- Beatrix Lehmann as Domina's mother
- Alfie Bass as Gatekeeper
- Roy Kinnear as Gladiator instructor
- Bill Kerr as Gladiator-in-training
- Lucienne Bridou as Panacea
- Helen Funai as Tintinabula
- Jon Pertwee as Crassus
- Janet Webb as Fertilla
- Peter Butterworth as Sentry
- Frank Thornton as Slave driver
- Jennifer and Susan Baker as Geminae twins

=== Cast notes ===
- Phil Silvers was suffering from a serious eye infection during filming in Spain and didn't trust overseas medical help to treat him properly, so he hid the condition as best he could. Silvers wrote in his autobiography that he became trapped on a high ledge during filming and was unable to see well enough to get down by himself. He did not enjoy his time making the film as much as he should have, which is why he jumped at the chance to star in the Broadway revival of the play.
- Veteran comedian Keaton was terminally ill with cancer at the time of filming. Nevertheless, the 70-year-old was able to perform many of his own stunts, to the amazement of the cast and crew. Forum was his final film appearance; he died 8 months prior to the film's release.
- Future Third Doctor Jon Pertwee, brother of screenwriter Michael Pertwee, appears briefly as Crassus, who reports that there is no plague in Crete. He had originally played Lycus in the 1963 West End stage production.
- Kinnear appeared in eight other films directed by Richard Lester: Help! (1965), How I Won the War (1967), The Bed Sitting Room (1969), The Three Musketeers (1973), The Four Musketeers (1974), Juggernaut (1974), Royal Flash (1975) and The Return of the Musketeers (1989).

== Songs ==
- "Comedy Tonight" — Pseudolus and Company
- "Lovely" — Philia and Hero
- "Everybody Ought to Have a Maid" — Pseudolus, Senex, Lycus, and Hysterium
- "Bring Me My Bride" — Miles Gloriosus and Company
- "Lovely" (reprise) — Pseudolus and Hysterium
- "Funeral Sequence" — Pseudolus, Miles Gloriosus and Company
- "Finale" — Company

Songs from the original Broadway score which were cut for the film: "Love I Hear" (Hero), "Free" (Pseudolus and Hero), "Pretty Little Picture" (Pseudolus, Hero, Philia), "I'm Calm" (Hysterium), "Impossible" (Senex and Hero), "That Dirty Old Man" (Domina) and "That'll Show Him" (Philia).

Sondheim's music was adapted for the film version of Forum by Ken Thorne, who previously worked with The Beatles on Help! (1965).

== Production ==
Although the musical had originally been written with Phil Silvers in mind, Zero Mostel starred on Broadway as Pseudolus, and Richard Lester was his choice to direct the film version. Other directors who were considered included Charlie Chaplin, Orson Welles and Mike Nichols. It was filmed at the Samuel Bronston Studios in Madrid, Spain (in the former set for Bronston's box-office bomb The Fall of the Roman Empire), and on location around that city, on an estimated budget of $2 million. Filming took place from September to November 1965.

Jack Gilford was also re-creating his stage role, as Hysterium, and there are other connections to the Broadway production. Tony Walton, who designed the production, including the costumes, was also the designer of the Broadway show. For Walton, who was married to Julie Andrews from 1959 to 1967, Forum came at the beginning of both his film and stage careers: it was his second Broadway production, and his third film - he had designed costumes for Mary Poppins in 1964, and did the overall production design of Fahrenheit 451 in 1966. Bob Simmons, a renowned stunt coordinator, designed and performed many of the action scenes in the film.

Forum is remarkable as one of the few films in which Buster Keaton appeared where he employed a double. Keaton was suffering from terminal cancer at the time – a fact of which he was not aware – and Mick Dillon stood-in for him for the running sequences. However, Buster performed the pratfall after running into a tree in the chase sequence near the end of the film himself, as no one could properly imitate his pratfalls.

The animated end credits created by Richard Williams feature many houseflies, a reminder of the fly problem the production suffered through when the fruits and vegetables which festooned the set were left out to rot overnight after the end of the shooting day.

George Martin, who with Ethel Martin is credited with the choreography of the film, was the assistant to choreographer Jack Cole on Broadway. (Jerome Robbins also did some uncredited work on the stage show.) Other members of the Forum team are notable as well. Cinematographer Nicholas Roeg moved up to the director's chair to make films such as Performance (1970), with Mick Jagger, Walkabout (1971), Don't Look Now (1973), and The Man Who Fell to Earth (1976) with David Bowie.

== Release ==
Forum premiered in New York City on October 16, 1966 and in London on December 14 of that year. It went into general release in January 1967.

== Reception ==
=== Box office ===
The movie obtained $8.5 million in actual box office domestic gross receipts during 1966–67. When adjusted for current (2019) movie costs, its box office revenue would be equivalent to $69.3 million. It was the 26th-most-popular film shown in U.S. theaters that year.

The film received about $3 million in rentals in the U.S.

=== Critical response ===
The film received generally positive notices, with a current 86% score on review aggregator website Rotten Tomatoes, based on 22 reviews, with an average of 7.00/10. Variety wrote, "Flip, glib and sophisticated, yet rump-slappingly bawdy and fast-paced, 'Forum' is a capricious look at the seamy underside of classical Rome through a 20th-Century hipster's shades [...] Generally assayed with satirical thrust and on-target accuracy, almost all of the performances are top-rung and thoroughly expert." In a generally favorable review for The New York Times, Vincent Canby praised the "handsomely realistic settings" and determined that "Stephen Sondheim's music and lyrics hold up well," but also found it "hard to decide whether Mr. Lester has gone too far, or not far enough, in translating into film terms the carefully calculated nonsense originally conceived for the theater. He's done a lot of tricky things — with his penchant for quick cutting and juxtaposition of absurd images — but there are times when this style seems oddly at variance with the basic material, which is roughly 2,000 years older than the motion-picture camera."

Philip K. Scheuer of the Los Angeles Times wrote that the film moved so fast that "I simply couldn't ingest it all in one viewing," but "I was able to register enough to realize I was enjoying myself hugely. 'Forum' is a bawdy, ribald romp that rips Rome's Great Society right up the middle, an out-and-out burlesque show that may even—underneath all the frenetic foolery, the flourishing of floozies and the pratfalls—have something satirical and cynical to tell us about nations and why they fall." Richard L. Coe of The Washington Post raved, ""Bawdy, gaudy and lawry, how funny! 'A Funny Thing Happened on the Way to the Forum' has arrived at the Cinema, where laughter should be exploding for months."

Brendan Gill of The New Yorker wrote "I laughed my way mindlessly through ninety percent of the picture," calling the jokes "both awful and exactly right for Mostel, Silvers and company." A review in the UK's Monthly Film Bulletin thought that Lester's fast-moving direction style made for a "curious effect of dislocation," writing that Mostel and Silvers "constantly find the editor snapping at their tails while Lester dashes down some attractive byway and the laugh they probably would have got is stopped short." The review concluded, "Apart from the long chase at the end, which is boring and irrelevant, this is an odd, good-humoured mess of a film, in spite of everything decidedly likeable."

A negative review came from Rex Reed who opined in his review of the tape version of the film's soundtrack album that "the real wit in Stephen Sondheim's score for the very funny Broadway burlesque A Funny Thing Happened on the Way to the Forum was all but totally demolished in Richard Lester's vulgar, witless, and over-stylized film version. All but a handful of the marvelous Sondheim songs were ditched, the few remaining musical numbers were so integrated into the action that they took a back seat to Lester's self-conscious visual gimmicks, and the riotous Zero Mostel was nearly crowded out of the plot completely."

=== Awards and nominations ===
Ceremony	Category	Nominee	Result	Ref.
39th Academy Awards	Best Music, Scoring of Music, Adaptation or Treatment	Ken Thorne	Won	
24th Golden Globe Awards	Best Motion Picture – Musical or Comedy	—N/a	Nominated	

== See also ==
- List of American films of 1966
- Up Pompeii – 1971 British comedy film by Bob Kellett
- Up Pompeii! – British TV sitcom (1969–1991)
