= Bob Kellett =

English film director (1927–2012)

- Kellett c. 1972
- Born: Robert Ryerson Kellett; 25 December 1927; Lancaster, Lancashire, England
- Died: 27 November 2012 (aged 84); Westergate, West Sussex, England
- Occupations: Film director; Film producer; Screenwriter; Television director
- Years active: 1964—2002

Robert Ryerson Kellett (25 December 1927 – 27 November 2012) was a British film director, film producer, screenwriter, television director and television writer one of British cinema’s and television's most prominent comedy directors in the 1970s, working with many of the big names of the era, including Ronnie Barker and Frankie Howerd.

== Biography ==
Born in Lancaster, Lancashire, on 25 December 1927, the son of a British Army officer, Bob Kellett was educated at Bedford School, where he was captain of boats. He became a writer with the advertising agencies Foote, Cone & Belding and Notley, and in 1950 he moved to Wessex Films, working as script editor for the film producer Ian Dalrymple on Thomas Hardy adaptations such as Far from the Madding Crowd. He joined the ITV franchise holder Associated-Rediffusion in 1956 and contributed scripts to the first series of the detective drama Shadow Squad and to Jim's Inn, starring Jimmy Hanley. In 1960 he established his own company, Gannet Films, producing and directing short documentaries for the Central Office of Information.

Kellett's first feature film as producer, in 1964, was A Home of Your Own, starring Ronnie Barker as a worker on a building site where a couple, the husband played by Richard Briers, buy a home. In 1966 he wrote and produced the comedy San Ferry Ann, starring Joan Sims, Wilfrid Brambell and Barbara Windsor. In 1967 he produced the comedy Just Like a Woman, starring Wendy Craig, and, in 1969, he directed and produced Futtocks End starring Ronnie Barker and Michael Hordern. He was chosen by producer Ned Sherrin to direct Frankie Howerd comedies, and he made Up Pompeii and Up the Chastity Belt in 1971, and Up the Front in 1972.

In 1971 he directed Girl Stroke Boy starring Michael Hordern and Joan Greenwood as a couple whose son falls in love with a black transvestite. He directed the wartime farce Our Miss Fred starring Danny La Rue in 1972, The Alf Garnett Saga starring Warren Mitchell in 1972, Don't Just Lie There, Say Something! starring Brian Rix, Leslie Phillips and Joanna Lumley in 1973, Spanish Fly starring Leslie Phillips and Terry-Thomas in 1975, and the big-screen version of Are You Being Served? in 1977. For television he directed episodes of Space: 1999, between 1975 and 1976, and the series Seagull Island in 1981.

Bob Kellett died in Westergate, West Sussex, on 27 November 2012, at the age of 84.

== Filmography ==
- Before You Go (2002) (second unit director)
- Haunted (1995) (scriptwriter)
- F/X2 (1991) (production consultant) a.k.a. F/X2: The Deadly Art of Illusion or FX2
- Tightrope to Terror (1983) (director and scriptwriter, credited as Robert Kellett)
- Are You Being Served? (1977)
- Spanish Fly (1975)
- All I Want is You and You and You (1974)
- Don't Just Lie There, Say Something! (1974)
- The Alf Garnett Saga (1972) a.k.a. The Garnett Saga (UK)
- Our Miss Fred (1972) a.k.a. Beyond the Call of Duty (Canada) or Operation: Fred (US)
- Up the Front (1972)
- Up the Chastity Belt (1971) a.k.a. Naughty Knights or The Chastity Belt (USA)
- Up Pompeii (1971)
- Girl Stroke Boy (1971)
- Futtocks End (1970) (director and producer)
- A Cathedral in Our Time (1967)
- Just Like a Woman (1967) (producer)
- San Ferry Ann (1966) (scriptwriter and producer)
- A Home of Your Own (1964) (producer)

=== Television ===
- Seagull Island (1981) (associate producer, credited as Robert Kellett)
- Space: 1999 (3 episodes, 1975–1976) a.k.a. Spazio 1999 (Italy)
- The Last Enemy (1976)
- Voyager's Return (1975)
- The Full Circle (1976)
