= Lance Percival =

British actor and comedian (1933–2015)

- Born: John Lancelot Blades Percival; 26 July 1933; Sevenoaks, Kent, England
- Died: 6 January 2015 (aged 81); London, England
- Occupations: Actor; comedian; singer
- Years active: 1961–1990

John Lancelot Blades Percival (26 July 1933 – 6 January 2015), known as Lance Percival, was an English actor, comedian and singer, best known for his appearances in satirical comedy television shows of the early 1960s and his ability to improvise comic calypsos about current news stories. He later became successful as an after-dinner speaker.

== Biography ==
Percival was born in Sevenoaks, Kent, and was educated at Sherborne School in Dorset, where he learnt to play the guitar. He then did national service with the Seaforth Highlanders as a lieutenant and was posted to Egypt. In 1955 he emigrated to Canada where he worked as an advertising copywriter, writing jingles for radio. He also formed a calypso group as "Lord Lance" which toured the US and Canada.

He first became well known in the early 1960s for performing topical calypsos on television shows such as That Was The Week That Was, after having been discovered by Ned Sherrin, performing at the Blue Angel Club in Mayfair. A tall thin man with a distinctive crooked nose and prominent ears, he also appeared in several British comedy films including the Carry On film Carry On Cruising (1962) (replacing Charles Hawtrey who resigned after a dispute over billing). He had a cameo role in The V.I.P.s (1963) and another in The Yellow Rolls-Royce (1964). He had a major role, and second billing, in the comedy musical It's All Over Town (1964).

He also appeared in his own BBC TV comedy series Lance at Large (also 1964), with writers Peter Tinniswood and David Nobbs. in 1960 he starred on the comedy revue One Over The Eight.

Working, like many British comics of the era, with George Martin at Parlophone, Percival had one UK Singles Chart hit, his cover version of a calypso-style song entitled "Shame and Scandal in the Family" which reached number 37 in October 1965, and recorded several other comedy songs, including "The Beetroot Song" ("If You Like Beetroot I'll Be True To You", 1963), written by Mitch Murray, and "The Maharajah of Brum" (1967), written with Martin.

Later he provided the voice of both Paul McCartney and Ringo Starr for the cartoon series The Beatles (1965), leading to his voicing the central character "Old Fred" in the Beatles' animated film Yellow Submarine. He also appeared as an "upper class tramp" in the Herman's Hermits film Mrs. Brown, You've Got a Lovely Daughter (1968). During the 1960s and 1970s, on BBC Radio 4 and on its predecessor the BBC Home Service, he was a regular panelist on Ian Messiter's Many a Slip.

He starred alongside Julie Andrews, Rock Hudson and Jeremy Kemp in the musical film Darling Lili (1970) and also appeared in There's a Girl in My Soup. Also in 1970, he appeared in a rare dramatic role in the war film Too Late the Hero starring Michael Caine and Cliff Robertson.

On 14 December 1970, he was involved in a fatal three-car crash in his Jaguar XJ on a notorious stretch of the A20, south of Farningham, Kent, known as Death Hill. Percival was in hospital for a month, he almost lost the sight of one eye and required 123 stitches. Following his recovery, he was charged with causing death by dangerous driving. In court he testified remembering the car drifting left and right, but his memory of the accident was vague. He was acquitted after evidence showed that a tyre on his car had probably deflated before the crash. Percival accepted liability for the accident and in a legal action that reached the Court of Appeal he paid a total of £35,781 in damages to his two passengers and to the widow and the two children of the driver who was killed (equivalent to £410,000 in 2024).

Percival returned to film work in the Frankie Howerd films Up Pompeii (1971), Up the Chastity Belt (1971), and Up the Front (1972), sustaining a film career until 1978. Between 1972 and 1978 the Thames Television game show Whodunnit! was written by Percival and Jeremy Lloyd.

Percival appeared on BBC Radio light entertainment programmes such as Just a Minute throughout the 1980s and was also the author of two books of verse, Well-Versed Cats and Well-Versed Dogs, both illustrated by Lalla Ward. Subsequently, he gained a reputation as a writer and later as an after-dinner speaker.

Percival died on 6 January 2015, aged 81, after a long illness. His son Jamie said: "When he spoke about his showbiz life, he spoke fondly of his time on That Was the Week That Was, and he always loved Ned Sherrin, who discovered him performing at the Blue Angel Club". He was cremated at Putney Vale Crematorium on 20 January 2015.

== Filmography ==
=== Film ===
- The Devil's Daffodil (1961) – Französischer Gendarme / French gendarme (uncredited)
- Raising the Wind (1961) – Harry
- On the Fiddle (1961) – MacTaggart (uncredited)
- What a Whopper (1961) – Policeman at Roundabout
- Postman's Knock (1961) – Joe
- Twice Round the Daffodils (1962) – George Logg
- Carry On Cruising (1962) – Wilfred Haines, Ship's Cook
- In the Doghouse (1962) – Policeman (uncredited)
- The V.I.P.s (1963) – B.O.A.C. Officer
- It's All Over Town (1964) – Richard Abel
- Hide and Seek (1964) – Dancer (uncredited)
- The Yellow Rolls-Royce (1964) – Assistant Car Salesman
- Joey Boy (1965) – Clarence Doubleday
- You Must Be Joking! (1965) – Young Man (uncredited)
- The Big Job (1965) – Timothy 'Dipper' Day
- Mrs. Brown, You've Got a Lovely Daughter (1968) – Percy Sutton
- Yellow Submarine (1968) – Old Fred (voice)
- Too Late the Hero (1970) – Cpl. McLean
- Darling Lili (1970) – T.C. Carstairs
- The Weekend Murders (1970) – Supt. Grey
- There's a Girl in My Soup (1970) – Willie the Bridegroom (uncredited)
- Up Pompeii (1971) – Bilius
- The Magnificent Six and ½: Up the Creek (1971)
- Up the Chastity Belt (1971) – Reporter
- Up the Front (1972) – Von Gutz
- Our Miss Fred (1972) – Smallpiece
- Confessions from a Holiday Camp (1977) – Lionel
- The Water Babies (1978) – Terence the Sea Horse (voice)
- Rosie Dixon – Night Nurse (1978) – Jake Fletcher
- Quincy's Quest (1979) – Jack
- Jekyll & Hyde (1990) – Beresford Mount, Prince's Private Secretary (final film role)

=== Television ===
- That Was the Week That Was (1962–1963) – Himself
- Citizen James (1962)
- The Beatles (1965–1967) – Paul McCartney / Ringo Starr / Ed Sullivan
- Jason King (1972) – Alfred Trim
- Who Do You Do? (1972–1973) – Various Impressions
- Chico the Rainmaker aka The Boy with Two Heads (1974) – Stanley Thornton
- Oscar the Rabbit in Rubbidge (1977) – narrator (English version)
- Shoestring (1980) – Jake Rivere
- Bullseye (1983) – Himself

== Discography ==
- 1963 – Riviera Cayf / You're Joking of Course (7", Single) [Parlophone – R 5032]
- 1963 – The Beetroot Song / Dancing in the Streets Tonight (7", Single) [Parlophone – R 5071]
- 1965 – There's Another One Behind / Shame and Scandal in the Family (7", Single) [Parlophone – R 5335]
- 1966 – If I Had Wings / My Girl, My Shirll (7", Single) [Parlophone – R 5417]
- 1966 – End of the Season / Our Jim (7", Single) [Parlophone – R 5517]
- 1967 – I'm Beautiful / I've Been Left Behind (7", Single) [Parlophone – R 5657]
- 1967 – The Maharajah of Brum / Taking the Maharajah Apart (7", Single) [Parlophone – R 5587]
