= Serretta Wilson =

British actress

- Born: September 8, 1951 (age 74); Fairfax, Virginia, U.S.
- Occupation: Actress

Serretta Diane Wilson (born 8 September 1951, Fairfax, Virginia) is an American-born British actress.

== Early life ==
Her father was employed by the American government in a capacity that had the family moving to different countries, over the course of which Wilson learned French, Spanish, and Italian, and took up fencing, horseback riding, singing, and dance.

== Career ==
She is known particularly for playing Marilyn Monroe in I'm Dreaming the Hardest, and also appeared with Timothy West in Death of a Salesman. In 1990, she appeared in the Cheltenham performance of Noises Off.

On television, she danced with The Young Generation, and has played parts in Thriller (1975), The Zoo Gang, The Borgias, Jeeves and Wooster (1993), and London Bridge on television, and small roles in films such as Up the Chastity Belt (1972), Tower of Evil (1972), Our Miss Fred (1972), Psychomania (1973), Keep It Up Downstairs (1976) and Sweeney 2 (1978). In the Dad's Army episode "Getting the Bird" (1972), she appeared as Sergeant Wilson's estranged daughter. She appeared as Betty Anstey in an episode of Rumpole of the Bailey (1979). In the Space: 1999 episode "Dorzak", Wilson plays the part of a refugee.

In 1995, she appeared in a production of The House of Mirth by Edith Wharton.

== Filmography ==
=== Film ===
| Year | Title | Role | Notes |
|---|---|---|---|
| 1971 | Up the Chastity Belt | Serving Wench | |
| 1972 | Tower of Evil | Mae Harvey | |
| 1972 | Our Miss Fred | Elvira | |
| 1973 | Psychomania | Stella | |
| 1973 | That'll Be the Day | Girlfriend | Uncredited |
| 1976 | Keep It Up Downstairs | Betsy Ann Dureneck | |
| 1976 | Epangelmaties remalia | Maggie | |
| 1978 | Sweeney 2 | Girl | |
| 1998 | B. Monkey | Texan Wife | |
| 2006 | The Da Vinci Code | American Woman | |
| 2011 | Love's Kitchen | Jill | |
