= The Amorous Milkman =

1975 British film by Derren Nesbitt

- UK 1-sheet poster by Tom Chantrell
- Directed by: Derren Nesbitt
- Written by: Derren Nesbitt
- Produced by: Derren Nesbitt
- Starring: Diana Dors; Brendan Price; Julie Ege
- Cinematography: James Allen (as Jim Allen)
- Edited by: Russell Lloyd
- Music by: Roger Webb
- Production company: Lactifer Films
- Release date: January 1975
- Running time: 86 minutes
- Country: United Kingdom
- Language: English

The Amorous Milkman is a 1975 British sex comedy film directed by Derren Nesbitt and starring Julie Ege, Diana Dors and Brendan Price. It was written by Nesbitt based on his 1973 novel of the same name.

A young milkman enjoys a number of adventures with bored women on his round. One version of the poster showed a self-satisfied cat licking its lips above the tagline, "If your pussy could only talk."

== Plot ==
Randy milkman Davey ends up delivering more than pints of milk to some of the bored housewives on his round. In a short space of time he finds himself engaged to two different women, Janice and Margo, on the receiving end of a bad beating from John, the local gangster, whose girlfriend Diana has been two-timing him with Davey, and finally ending up in court on a rape charge when Gerald, an irate husband, comes home unexpectedly and discovers Davey and his wife Rita in a compromising situation.

== Cast ==
- Julie Ege as Diana
- Diana Dors as Rita
- Brendan Price as Davey
- Alan Lake as Sandy
- Donna Reading as Janice
- Nancie Wait as Margo
- Bill Fraser as Gerald
- Roy Kinnear as sergeant
- Ray Barrett as John
- Fred Emney as magistrate
- Patrick Holt as Tom
- Anthony Sharp as counsel
- Megs Jenkins as Iris
- Arnold Ridley as cinema attendant
- Sam Kydd as Wilf
- Janet Webb as Vera
- Marianne Morris as Dora (uncredited)
- Hugo Keith-Johnston as hippy in nightclub (uncredited)

== Critical reception ==
The Monthly Film Bulletin wrote: "A vulgar and fragmented odyssey whose victim-hero bears some superficial resemblance to the Malcolm McDowell of A Clockwork Orange [1971]. With its senile depiction of youth, its haggard innuendoes and its bunny club puritanism, the film's only appreciative audience is likely to be survivors from the Doris Day/Rock Hudson cycle of the late Fifties and early Sixties, whose atmosphere it oddly duplicates. Unfortunately the film's opening exchange is its only highpoint: "I suppose you'd like some butter? You know, I haven't eaten butter since seeing Last Tango in Paris". All in all, this is British graffiti at its worst."

David Parkinson wrote in the Radio Times: "Brendan Price does his best to rattle his pintas with panache. The most significant thing about this bawdy trash is what it says about the state of the British film industry at the time – it's sad that this was the only worthwhile work Diana Dors, Roy Kinnear and other talented actors could find."

Sky Movies wrote, "much in the vulgar mode of dozens of 'Confessions', 'Adventures' and 'Up' sex romps of the seventies, this one-man project (actor Derren Nesbitt wrote, produced and directed it) is a touch above that level, if only because its girls are at least sexy and its veteran cast is full of names who have seen better films and better days."
