= Girl Stroke Boy =

1971 British film by Bob Kellett

- Theatrical release poster
- Directed by: Bob Kellett
- Screenplay by: Caryl Brahms; Ned Sherrin
- Based on: Girlfriend by David Percival
- Produced by: Terry Glinwood; Ned Sherrin
- Cinematography: Ian Wilson
- Edited by: Brian Smedley Aston
- Music by: John Scott
- Production companies: Virgin Films; Hemdale
- Distributed by: London Screen
- Release date: 12 August 1971 (London)
- Running time: 86 minutes
- Country: United Kingdom
- Language: English
- Budget: £50,000

Girl Stroke Boy (also known as Girl/Boy) is a 1971 British comedy-drama film directed by Bob Kellett and starring Joan Greenwood, Michael Hordern, Clive Francis, and Peter Straker. It was written by Caryl Brahms and Ned Sherrin based on the 1970 play Girlfriend by David Percival.

== Plot ==
A middle-aged couple, author Letty and school teacher George, worry if their son Laurie will ever get married. Laurie brings home his new girlfriend Jo, the androgynous child of a West Indian politician, whose gender and sex Letty begins to question.

== Cast ==
- Joan Greenwood as Lettice Mason
- Michael Hordern as George Mason
- Clive Francis as Laurie
- Peter Straker as Jo Delaney
- Patricia Routledge as Pamela Hovendon
- Peter Bull as Peter Hovendon
- Rudolph Walker as Mr Delaney
- Diana Hoddinott as wife / husband
- Elisabeth Welch as Mrs Delaney

== Girlfriend ==
The film was based on the play Girlfriend. The cast included Margaret Leighton, John Standing (Lorn), Alan MacNaughton (George), and Michel Des Barres and was directed by Vivian Matalon. It was by first time author, school teacher David Percival. It opened on 17 February 1970.

The Daily Telegraph called it "an equivocal comedy balanced halfway between a wink and a snigger." The Observer said "it dragged the you-can't-tell-them-apart-in-those-clothes joke over a lamentable evening in which you were asked to believe no one on stage could notice the fiance of title's Adam's apple. The most maddening thing about it was the waste" of the cast and the author's talent whose "lines were fine. They only needed a play."

== Production ==
The play had flopped but Ned Sherrin bought the film rights. The movie version was shot over two weeks at a cost of £50,000 (the low cost because fees were deferred). The film was sold to John Daly of Hemdale.

It was the film debut of Peter Straker, who had been in Hair. He called the script "hysterical but it didn't turn out as well as it could have. But it was the chance of a lifetime."

== Reception ==
Producer Ned Sherrin said the film previewed well but received poor reviews and minimal box office. However he says the film's costs were recovered through a television sale. Peter Straker said the film had a long run in cinemas and was released on a double bill with School for Virgins.

The Monthly Film Bulletin wrote: "Although this odd film – based on a short-running play – is set almost entirely in the (literally) stifling atmosphere of a snowbound country retreat, Bob Kellett's inventive yet discreet direction does at least eliminate a surprising amount of staginess. But despite some engagingly batty dialogue, the script flogs its two jokes very nearly to death; and whereas the relentlessly climbing temperature just about retains its lunatic appeal until the end, the altercations over the epicene youth (white in the play, black in the film) have no real progression and quickly pall. The film's one constant pleasure is in the expertly polished performances of Joan Greenwood and Michael Hordern as yet another set of respectable, contented and fearfully maladjusted parents. Their fumbling attempts at diplomatic curiosity ("Jo is rather an unusual name for a young person of your sex") are often quite irresistible."

Variety called it "a light, would-be sophisticated comedy" where "Young and old alike could find its single uni-sex joke tedious and sometimes unpleasant... The film, despite added exteriors, is stagy in the extreme."

The Evening Standard said "it might have been called "Guess What's Coming to Dinner?"... a more tedious, ill-made, appallingly-acted and directed piece of mindlessness it would be difficult to discover in a decade of filmgoing."

Peter Straker claimed "the reviewers were just trying to make it into a vast racial transvestite mountain. It would have been alright if they had just stuck to the movie's failings as a comedy. And there were many, which I think was the fault of the director."

Filmink argued "the movie has one joke – the parents can’t figure it out – which is dragged out far, far too long and the script badly needs another complication, but Girl Stroke Boy is remarkably progressive in its depiction of sexuality...the gay couple are shown in a very positive light as having a clearly loving and supportive relationship."
