= Elizabeth Larner =

English actress and singer (1932–2022)

- Sunday Mirror, 1956
- Born: Elizabeth Patricia Larner; 29 October 1932; Wigan, England
- Died: 11 March 2022 (aged 89); Venice, Florida, U.S.
- Spouses: Peter Page (1956–19??); Charles D. Calhoun

Elizabeth Patricia Larner (29 October 1932 – 11 March 2022) was an English actress and soprano. While her main career was the musical theatre, appearing both in London's West End and on Broadway, she also played Ammonia in the BBC situation comedy Up Pompeii!. She later appeared in The Two Ronnies, supporting Ronnie Barker as "Piggy Malone" and Ronnie Corbett as "Charley Farley" in the 1981–1982 comic detective mystery serial Band of Slaves.

== Early life ==
Elizabeth Patricia Larner was born in Wigan, Lancashire. During World War II, her family relocated to Blackpool, where Larner attended Tyldesley Secondary School. She trained with the Tower Children's Ballet.

== Career ==
Larner was cast in the chorus of the original 1951 London Coliseum production of Kiss Me, Kate. She was also an understudy and took over when the star of the show Patricia Morison fell ill. Larner then toured as Kate/Lilli in Kiss Me, Kate with Christopher Hewett as Fred/Petruchio. She played leading roles in West End productions of Wish You Were Here, Kismet, and Camelot with Laurence Harvey as Arthur. She recruited millions more admirers with her numerous television appearances. She recorded an album of "vocal gems" from The New Moon and Rose-Marie with Andy Cole in one of His Master's Voice's (EMI) first stereo recordings. {To hear her voice from this recording, it is now partly available – The New Moon tracks at least – as a "filler" in the recent re-release of the June Bronhill/Edmund Hockridge version of The Desert Song – EMI CFP 3359872}. She continued to contribute to the various His Master's Voice/EMI studio recordings of musicals up until the late 60s. Her film work in the 1970s includes appearances in Song of Norway (1970) and Royal Flash (1975).

During the 1980s, she appeared in two Broadway productions: as Mrs. Bumble/Mrs. Bedwin in the 1984 Cameron Mackintosh revival of Oliver! with Ron Moody and Patti LuPone, and as Lady Diss/Mrs. Brown in the 1986 first American production of Me and My Girl with Robert Lindsay, Maryann Plunkett and Jane Connell. She also appeared in an Off-Off-Broadway cabaret revue, Don't Cry, Baby, It's Only a Movie, with lyrics by Fran Landesman and music by Jason McAuliffe.

== Personal life ==
By the 1990s, she had retired to Venice, Florida. Larner died there on 11 March 2022, at the age of 89.
