= Quincy's Quest =

1979 film

- Directed by: Robert Reed
- Screenplay by: Tommy Steele
- Produced by: Robert Reed
- Starring: Tommy Steele; Mel Martin; Charles Morgan
- Music by: Peter Knight
- Production company: Thames Television
- Release date: 1979
- Running time: minutes
- Country: United Kingdom
- Language: English

Quincy's Quest is a 1979 British family film directed by Robert Reed, and starring Tommy Steele, Mel Martin and Charles Morgan. It was written by Steele. A version was first shown on television on 23 December 1962 as The Tommy Steele Show: Quincy's Quest.

== Plot ==
In a department store, unwanted toys are set to be destroyed. One of the rejects, a doll named Quincy, embarks on a quest to find Santa Claus, the only person who can save them. The first room Quincy enters is for costume dolls, where he meets Mr. Perfect, who is disgusted by the fact Quincy is a reject. Quincy then explains (through song) why he is happy being such.

Conn is informed via telephone that Quincy is a reject and lures him into his ventriloquist dummy show. This allows Quincy the chance to sing, but then Conn convinces him to board a train, claiming it will lead him straight to Santa’s grotto. While driving it, Quincy runs headfirst into a black train, causing both to explode. He is found by a doll named Rebecca, who takes him to her disappearing village made of building blocks. After Rebecca says that the man of her dreams would wear a uniform, Quincy buys a soldier costume and is mistaken as a real red toy soldier. He is sent to battle blue soldiers, but manages to escape.

The Witch blocks the way upstairs with boxes. Quincy considers giving up before voices in his head encourage him to continue, so he throws a rope up to the next storey. After a short rest, he meets a group of animals: Gerry the Giraffe, Larry the Leopard, Lionel the Lion and Ellie the Elephant, who live in a land of stuffed animals. Quincy convinces them to join him on his quest to save his friends and ends up reuniting with Rebecca. She, however, is revealed to be in contact with the Witch, who kidnaps Quincy and ties him up to be attacked by robots. He is able to use various tanks and missiles to defend himself, which causes the Witch to activate the giant robot Archimedes. Top reprograms it to turn on the Witch and crush her.

Quincy carries Rebecca out into Santa’s grotto, and both turn back into regular dolls in time for a group of children led by Santa to find them. Smithy claims that they are rejects and attempts to destroy them. The children attack Smithy, who all grab toys for themselves, except for Quincy and Rebecca, who are picked up by Santa and kept as reminders of love and compassion being gifts to all. Their friends are saved too.

== Production ==
The film was shot at Shepperton Design Studios. The studio built Archimedes, a ten-foot suit with an unidentified actor inside.

Although it was without fault, the block bridge proved controversial. Designer and Shepperton founder Andrew Ainsworth wanted the bridge to connect like real blocks, using reaction injection molding. However, because the cast would dance on top of it, he reinforced it with a welded steel structure, which caused a fire due to the fuel energy contained within the bricks. It was quickly extinguished. Ainsworth then painted the bridge's surface with resin, which caused the cast’s shoes to come off their feet and stick to the ground.

== Cast ==
- Tommy Steele as Quincy
- Mel Martin as Rebecca
- Charles Morgan as narrator
- Frederick Schiller as Smithy
- Lila Kaye as Griselda / Mrs. Claus
- Tony Aitken as Teddy / Father Christmas
- Lance Percival as Jack
- Aubrey Woods as Mr. Perfect
- Matt Zimmerman as Conn
- Leo Dolan as soldier
- Willoughby Goddard as General
- James Woolley as aide de camp
- Gretchen Franklin as witch
- Roy Kinnear as Top
- Patsy Kensit as Jennifer
- Gary Fetterplace as boy
- Arnold Diamond as manager
- Jan Murzynowski as Smithy's assistant
- Peter Hawkins as voices

== Reception ==
Nancy Banks-Smith wrote in The Guardian: "Tommy Steele. Home-grown, hard-working, clean as a whistle, all heart except for the teeth. It is about a doll working his way up from the basement and is a perfectly pleasant reworking of Oz with a rather good battle scene."

== Book adaptation ==
In 1981, the same year Quincy’s Quest was repeated on ITV, Tommy Steele published a children’s book titled Quincy, based on the film.
