= Tex Fuller =

English actor and stuntman (1925–2020)

Albert Charles Baseley (11 December 1925 – 7 October 2020) was an English actor and stuntman, with a career spanning over four decades. He was best known under his stage name Tex Fuller.

== Life and career ==
Fuller made his first television appearance in 1958 and continued to appear in popular films and television shows as a stuntman such as: From Russia with Love (1963), Where Eagles Dare (1969), Doctor Who (1976), Star Wars: Episode IV - A New Hope (1977), In Sickness and in Health (1986-1990) and Last of the Summer Wine (1995). Fuller also appeared as an actor in films and television series such as: Carry On Constable (1960), The Avengers (1961), Z-Cars (1962), San Ferry Ann (1965), The Likely Lads (1966), No Blade of Grass (film) (1970), On the Buses (1971), Mutiny on the Buses (1972), The Two Ronnies (1979-1985), Doctor Who (1974) and Blake's 7 (1980).

He died in October 2020, at the age of 94.
