= Lally Bowers =

English actress (1914–1984)

- Born: Kathleen Bowers; 21 January 1914; Oldham, Lancashire, UK
- Died: 18 July 1984 (aged 70); London, England, UK
- Years active: 1936–1984

Kathleen "Lally" Bowers (21 January 1914 – 18 July 1984) was an English actress.

== Early life and education ==
Kathleen Bowers was born on 21 January 1914 in Oldham, Lancashire.

She was educated at Hulme Grammar School.

== Career ==
Bowers worked as a secretary before walking on and understudying at the Shakespeare Memorial Theatre in Stratford-upon-Avon.

As a professional actress, Bowers appeared in hundreds of stage productions, films and television programmes and rep at Manchester, Sheffield, Southport, Guildford, Liverpool, Birmingham, and the Bristol Old Vic.

Her London debut came in 1944 and her many West End successes included Dinner With the Family for which she won a Clarence Derwent award in 1957, Difference of Opinion, The Killing of Sister George (also on Broadway), Dear Octopus and The Beastly Beatitudes of Balthazar B. She appeared in the sitcoms You're Only Young Twice, Going Straight, Hi-de-Hi!, My Name Is Harry Worth and A Fine Romance.

Her film career included roles in We Joined the Navy (1962), Tamahine (1963), The Chalk Garden (1964), I Start Counting (1970), All the Way Up (1970), Up Pompeii (1971), Our Miss Fred (1972), Dracula A.D. 1972 (1972), The Slipper and the Rose (1976) and Screamtime (1983).

She also appeared in the 1982 adaptation of Agatha Christie's The Case of The Discontented Soldier in the role of Mrs. Ariadne Oliver, in the television series The Agatha Christie Hour.

== Death ==
Bowers died on 18 July 1984 in London.

== Partial filmography ==
- We Joined the Navy (1962) – Mrs. Cynthia Dewberry
- Tamahine (1963) – Mrs. Cartwright
- The Chalk Garden (1964) – Anna
- Undermined – Broadcast -12/6/1965- Effie, ( Paddington Hotel Proprietress ). Episode 6 : ' Intent to Kill '.
- I Start Counting (1970) – Aunt Rene
- All the Way Up (1970) – Mrs. Hadfield
- Up Pompeii (1971) – Procuria
- Up the Chastity Belt (1972) – (voice)
- Dracula A.D. 1972 (1972) – Matron
- Our Miss Fred (1972) – Miss Flodden
- The Slipper and the Rose (1976) – Queen
- You're Only Young Twice (1977)-Dolly Love
- Screamtime (1983) – Mrs. Kingsley
