= Aubrey Woods =

English actor and singer (1928–2013)

- Woods as Bill, the owner of Bill's Candy Shop Willy Wonka & the Chocolate Factory (1971)
- Born: Aubrey Harold Woods; 9 April 1928; Edmonton, Middlesex, England
- Died: 7 May 2013 (aged 85); Barrow-in-Furness, Cumbria, England
- Occupations: Actor, singer
- Years active: 1946–1995
- Spouse: Gaynor Woods (m. 1952)

Aubrey Harold Woods (9 April 1928 – 7 May 2013) was an English actor. He is best remembered for playing Bill in Willy Wonka & the Chocolate Factory, where he sang "The Candy Man".

== Biography and career ==
Woods was born on 9 April 1928 in Edmonton, Middlesex and grew up in nearby Palmers Green. He was educated at the Latymer School. His first film role was at the age of 17 as Smike in The Life and Adventures of Nicholas Nickleby (1947). On stage he played the role of Fagin in Lionel Bart's production of Oliver! at the New Theatre, St Martin's Lane in the 1960s alongside Nicolette Roeg and Robert Bridges. Woods played Alfred Jingle in the TV musical Pickwick for the BBC in 1969.

His best remembered film role is in Willy Wonka & the Chocolate Factory, where he played the character of Bill, the owner of Bill's Candy Shop, singing "The Candy Man" near the beginning of the film; the single was later a hit for entertainer Sammy Davis Jr. During the early 1970s Woods collaborated on the musical Trelawny with his friend Julian Slade.

His television credits include Z-Cars, Up Pompeii!, Doctor Who, Blake's 7, Auf Wiedersehen, Pet and Ever Decreasing Circles.

He also appeared as Jacob and Potiphar in the 1991 production of Joseph and the Amazing Technicolor Dreamcoat at the London Palladium, the soundtrack of which topped the UK albums chart in August 1991.

His radio credits include the original radio series of The Hitchhiker's Guide to the Galaxy, appearing in "Fit the Sixth". He dramatised E. F. Benson's 1932 comic novel Secret Lives in three parts for BBC radio, and was also the narrator.

== Personal life and death ==
Woods met his future wife, Gaynor, at RADA. They married in 1952.

Woods died of natural causes on 7 May 2013 at his home in Barrow-in-Furness, aged 85.

== Filmography ==
Year	Title	Role	Notes
1947	The Life and Adventures of Nicholas Nickleby	Smike	
1948	The Greed of William Hart	Jamie Wilson	
1949	The Queen of Spades	Dimitri	
1950	Guilt Is My Shadow	Doctor	
1954	Father Brown	Charlie	
1961	Spare the Rod	Mr. Bickerstaff	
1964	A Home of Your Own	Water Board Inspector	
1965	San Ferry Ann	Immigration Officer	
1967	Just like a Woman	T.V. Floor Manager	
1970	Futtocks End	Postman	
1970	Loot	Undertaker	
1970	Wuthering Heights	Joseph	
1971	All the Right Noises	Stage musical Performer: Foreman	
1971	Up Pompeii	Villanus	
1971	The Abominable Dr. Phibes	Goldsmith	
1971	Willy Wonka & the Chocolate Factory	Bill	
1971	Up the Chastity Belt	Vegetable Stall Holder	
1972	Doctor Who	Controller	Story: "Day of the Daleks"
1972	Z.P.G.	Dr. Mallory	
1972	The Darwin Adventure	Bishop Wilberforce	
1974	Jackanory Playhouse	Fitzwarren	Episode: "Dick Whittington"
1974	Don't Just Lie There, Say Something!	T.V. Chairman	
1975	That Lucky Touch	Viscount L'Ardey	
1975	Operation Daybreak		
1979	Blake's 7	Krantor	Episode: "Gambit"
1979	Quincy's Quest	Mr. Perfect	
1982	Witness for the Prosecution	Tailor	TV movie
1982	Rentaghost	Bergen	
1984	Auf Wiedersehen, Pet	Jurgen	Episode: "Last Rites"
1984	Cloak & Dagger	F.B.I. Agent	Uncredited
1987	I'll Take Manhattan	Priest	Miniseries
