= Then Churchill Said to Me =

1982 British TV sitcom

- Genre: Comedy
- Written by: Maurice Sellar and Lou Jones
- Directed by: Martin Shardlow
- Starring: Frankie Howerd; Nicholas Courtney; Joanna Dunham
- Theme music composer: Ronnie Hazlehurst
- Country of origin: United Kingdom
- Original language: English
- No. of series: 1
- No. of episodes: 6

Production
- Producer: Roger Race

Original release
- Network: UK Gold
- Release: 1 March – 5 April 1993

Then Churchill Said to Me is a television comedy series starring Frankie Howerd and Nicholas Courtney. Made in 1982, the series was not screened until 1993.

== Outline ==
The comedy is set in Winston Churchill's secret underground wartime bunker. Howerd plays a soldier named Private Potts who, according to the DVD's cover, "acts as a batman to a group of officers". Like the character of Lurcio in the popular Up Pompeii!, he is hell-bent on avoiding work and gets into various scrapes as a result.

The premise of the show was similar in content to the previous Howerd vehicles (see also Whoops Baghdad) but in a more contemporary setting. In one episode Private Potts is revealed to be a doppelganger of a high-ranking general, also portrayed by Howerd, echoing storylines from these series and their big screen adaptations.

== Cast ==
- Frankie Howerd as Private Percy Potts, a Batman in the underground Allied Army Headquarters, who spends most of the war avoiding work.
- Nicholas Courtney as Lt. Col. Robin Witherton, Potts' commanding officer who is having a (not so) secret affair with his secretary, Petty Officer Bottomly.
- Joanna Dunham as Petty Officer Joan Bottomley, Witherton's secretary, described by Potts as a "Po-faced madam" who is mean to everyone except Witherton.
- Shaun Curry as Sgt. Maj. McRuckus, Potts superior officer who hates Potts as much as Potts hates him, described by Potts as a "big pig".
- James Chase as Batman MacKensey / Private Macclesfield
- Michael Attwell as Pvt. Norman Pain
- Peggy Ann Clifford as Tealady
- Linda Cunningham as Sally Perks

== Episode list ==
No.	Title	Directed by	Written by	Original release date
1	"Operation Panic"	Martin Shardlow	Maurice Sellar, Lou Jones	1 March 1993
Private Potts accidentally leaves Lieutenant Colonel Witherton’s holiday request on Churchill's desk, making it appear Witherton volunteered for a dangerous mission. Witherton, who was hoping for a holiday with Petty Officer Joan Bottomly, demands Potts fix the mistake or he will take Potts on the mission with him. Potts realises he looks similar to General "Fearless" Freddy Hollocks and disguises himself as Hollocks to get Witherton removed from the mission, but only succeeds in causing a fight between the other Generals and breaking Witherton’s leg. Unable to go on the mission Witherton decides not to have Potts executed by firing squad, but does force him to clean and repaint the entire bunker for ruining his holiday.
2	"A Mole in the Hole"	Martin Shardlow	Maurice Sellar, Lou Jones	8 March 1993
A spy is leaking classified information. Potts overhears two officers speaking German and hopes to get a medal by catching them. Witherton covers classified papers in powder that turns skin green, hoping to catch the spy "green handed", and ignores Potts about the officers. A man from the Ministry of Information asks Potts to distribute leaflets about careless talk. Witherton finally believes Potts and has the officers arrested, only to realise they are radio specialists trained to speak German. Witherton and Potts are both arrested when their fingers turn green. They realise the leaflets must have been covered in the powder, meaning the spy is Jenkins the Welsh scientist who created the powder and must have disguised himself as the ministry man. Potts and Witherton are set free and Jenkins is arrested.
3	"Nanny By Searchlight"	Martin Shardlow	Maurice Sellar, Lou Jones	15 March 1993
A German officer defects to England, but Churchill plans to interrogate him in the Tower of London. Meanwhile, French General Charles de Gaulle requests a hotel suite for his visit to London. Witherton orders Potts to look after the regiment's goat mascot, but the goat eats the envelopes meant for the imprisonment orders. Potts mixes up the orders, so the German is given a hotel suite while de Gaulle is imprisoned in the tower. France, outraged at the insult, demands Potts duel de Gaulle's Batman. To ensure Britain is not embarrassed by Potts losing Witherton secretly loads both pistols with blanks, but the French Batman insists they use his French duelling pistols. Fortunately, the duelling ground is so foggy both duellists miss and the lucky Potts ends up with a duck he shot for supper.
4	"Those Who Loot We Shoot"	Martin Shardlow	Maurice Sellar, Lou Jones	22 March 1993
Witherton intends to impress Churchill's military advisors and sends Potts to find the Encyclopaedia of Battles and then to Witherton's house for his bags. Potts drops the encyclopaedia on Witherton's head, giving him amnesia, and then at Witherton's home an MP mistakenly arrests Potts for looting. With Witherton ill Potts is court-martialled. Facing death by firing squad Potts is inspired by a note on his cell wall and manages to swap clothes with WAAF Officer Vast Vera, who fancies him. Fortunately Potts accidentally head-butts Witherton while hiding from McRuckus. Witherton gets his memory back and confirms Potts innocence. Potts, meanwhile, claims he now has amnesia from the head-butt and gets a short holiday in the infirmary.
5	"The Goose Has Landed"	Martin Shardlow	Maurice Sellar, Lou Jones	5 April 1993
A threat is made against Churchill so Witherton orders Potts to push around a dummy in a wheelchair to tempt the assassin. Sub-lieutenant Williamson of MI5 arrives and expects a French resistance agent to arrive and identify the assassin. Believing the assassin may be female Williamson dresses as a woman to infiltrate the women's quarters, though a misunderstanding makes Potts believe Williamson is Witherton's "special friend". The French agent arrives but turns out to be German assassin Baroness Hanna von Thump, and she forces Potts to get drunk hoping he will reveal Churchill's location. Fortunately, they are found by Witherton and Williamson and Hanna drops her suicide grenade after Potts drunkenly pinches her bottom, and she is arrested.
6	"Blow Out"	Martin Shardlow	Maurice Sellar, Lou Jones	29 March 1993
Witherton believes a German jamming device above the map room is sabotaging the radios. McRuckus almost finds evidence of Potts illicit black market doings but instead orders Potts to help locate the jamming device. Since above the map room is where Potts stores his black market goods he blackmails Private Norman Pain into retrieving them while Potts distracts Witherton. A German air raid begins just as Potts and Witherton realise the jamming device was mice chewing the radio wires. The bunker roof collapses, trapping Potts and Witherton with an unexploded bomb. A bomb squad talks Potts through disarming the bomb, only for Potts to find a letter inside the bomb from Britains allies in the Czechoslovak resistance informing Potts they sabotaged all the bombs in the bomb factories.

== Transmission and commercial release ==
The series was made in 1982 but was not shown at the time due to the outbreak of the Falklands War. The programme was deemed unsuitable for transmission owing to its setting. It was first broadcast by the satellite channel UK Gold in 1993, and was finally broadcast on BBC Two in 2000.

All six episodes were released by the BBC on VHS in 1994 and subsequently on DVD, on its own in July 2006 and as part of a Frankie Howerd box-set in October, which also included Up Pompeii! (which never got its own individual DVD release) and a previously released compilation of Howerd's best moments including clips and interview material.
