= Janet Webb =

English actress (1930–1983)

Janet Webb (1 July 1930 – 29 December 1983) was an English actress.

== Biography ==
Webb with Morecambe and Wise

Webb was born Janet Patricia Webster on 1 July 1930, in Liverpool, Lancashire, the daughter of Gilbert Webster, Professor of music at the Royal Manchester College of Music and renowned as one of the few players of the cimbalom. Her mother was Adeline Ashcroft Webster (née Coghlan).

Webb was best known for her appearances on BBC television's The Morecambe & Wise Show where she was "the lady who comes on at the end". Webb had appeared in Morecambe and Wise sketches starting in 1964. Her first appearance as "the lady who comes on at the end" was non-speaking in the 1969 second series. Her part was later expanded to a talking role, her line was nearly always:

I'd like to thank all of you for watching me and my little show here tonight. If you've enjoyed it, then it's all been worthwhile. So, until we meet again, good night, and I love you all!

The farewell speech would be followed by gifts such as flowers, boxes of chocolates and the like. Webb stopped appearing regularly in 1972, due to ill health, but did make occasional cameo appearances in The Morecambe & Wise Show until 1974.

In 1972 she made an appearance on the Morecambe & Wise Christmas Special. The show featured clips of celebrities such as Eric Porter, André Previn, Ian Carmichael and Flora Robson stating, "I worked with Morecambe and Wise and look what happened..." showing that Porter had become a bin man, Previn a bus conductor, Carmichael became a paper boy and Robson a BBC tea lady. At the end of the show Webb appeared and after exiting a Rolls-Royce at her mansion explained "I worked with Morecambe and Wise and it never did me any harm". She later appeared with another BBC double act show - The Two Ronnies (Ronnie Barker and Ronnie Corbett) on several shows in their 1976 and 1977 series, with her final TV appearance being a character role in an episode from the Thames Television sitcom Room Service, written by Jimmy Perry.

She is reputed to have had a "fine singing voice" and had Alyn Ainsworth as her musical director. Her belting style was put to use on the 1969 Music For Pleasure album Songs Of A World At War by Janet Webb And The Naafi Singers (Music For Pleasure: MFP3005).

Her film career was short, but included appearances in British film comedies such as A Funny Thing Happened on the Way to the Forum (1966), The Amorous Milkman (1975), and Joseph Andrews (1977).

Webb was married to violinist Charles Vorzanger from 1957. She died from cancer on 29 December 1983 and was buried at the churchyard of St Paul's, Covent Garden, London Borough of Camden in London.
