= A Home of Your Own =

1965 British film by Jay Lewis

- Theatrical release poster
- Directed by: Jay Lewis
- Written by: Jay Lewis; Johnny Whyte
- Produced by: Bob Kellett
- Starring: Ronnie Barker; Bernard Cribbins; Richard Briers
- Cinematography: Denys Coop
- Edited by: Al Gell
- Music by: Ron Goodwin
- Production company: Dormar Productions
- Distributed by: British Lion
- Release date: 28 January 1965
- Running time: 45 minutes
- Country: United Kingdom
- Language: English
- Budget: £20,000

A Home of Your Own is a 1965 British comedy film directed by Jay Lewis and starring Ronnie Barker, Richard Briers, Peter Butterworth and Bernard Cribbins. It was written by Lewis and Johnny Whyte.

== Plot ==
The story is a brick-by-brick account of the building of a young couple's dream house. From the day when the site is first selected, to the day – several years and children later – when the couple finally move in, the story is a noisy but wordless comedy of errors, as the incompetent labourers struggle to complete the house. In this satirical look at British builders, many cups of tea are made, windows are broken and the same section of road is dug up over and over again by the water board, the electricity board and the gas board.

== Cast ==
- Ronnie Barker as the cement mixer
- Richard Briers as the husband
- Peter Butterworth as the carpenter
- Bernard Cribbins as the stonemason
- Bill Fraser as the shop steward
- Norman Mitchell as the foreman
- Ronnie Stevens as the architect
- Fred Emney as the mayor

Also starring

- Janet Brown
- Gerald Campion
- Bridget Armstrong
- George Benson
- Douglas Ives
- Jack Melford
- Thelma Ruby
- Tony Tanner
- Aubrey Woods
- Helen Cotterill
- Barrie Gosney
- Harry Locke
- Thorley Walters
- Henry Woolf

== Production ==
In the 2006 interview included on the DVD's box set release, producer Bob Kellett said the film's idea was not his own, but came from a comic idea to "de-prestige" a building company's vainglorious promotional film he and the writers had watched.

== Release ==
The film was released on 28 January 1965 at the Odeon Leicester Square together with A Shot in the Dark (1964).

== Reception ==
The Monthly Film Bulletin wrote: "The aural accompaniment to this little comedy consists of music and incoherent noises instead of dialogue: grunts of command from one man to another, or pitiful, faint cries from the discomfited architect, finally winched into the air in his sports car after suffering considerable embarrassment on previous visits due to his ignorance of working procedure. The really happy thing about the film, however is the way it looks: the semi-circle of old car seats formed for the first teabreak in the workmen's first few minutes on the site; the arrival of large groups of men from the gas or water boards whose usefulness appears to depend on one man (the hole-digger or the water-diviner) completing his job first; the inevitable explosion when a pipe-smoking observer tosses a match on to the newly exposed, and damaged, gas pipe; the great hills of freshly dug earth among which the water board contingent eventually walk behind the man with the dowsing-rod; the shoddy cement block that cracks every time the most artistic of the workers is half-way through an inscription, finally painstakingly chiselled out only to shock the Mayoral party by its omission of the "I" in "public subscription". Evocatively photographed by Denys Coop, this is a bright, if unpretentious, piece of film-making, which it is heartening to be able to call our own."

== Home media ==
The film was released on Blu-ray in 2021 as part of Futtocks End and Other Short Stories, an anthology of short films produced by Kellett, also including San Ferry Ann (1965) and Vive le Sport (1969).

== See also ==
For the same theme, see Father Came Too!, from 1963.
