= Peter Greenwell =

British composer

Peter Ashley Greenwell (12 August 1929, Hampton-in-Arden – 4 June 2006, Dénia) was an English composer and pianist best known as an accompanist to Noël Coward. He wrote the music for the songs of The Crooked Mile (1959) and other musicals and plays, and also composed scores for British comedy films such as The Virgin Soldiers (1969), Our Miss Fred (1972), Up the Front (1972) and Don't Just Lie There, Say Something! (1973).
