= San Ferry Ann =

1965 British film by Jeremy Summers

- Promotional poster
- Directed by: Jeremy Summers
- Screenplay by: Bob Kellett
- Produced by: Bob Kellett
- Starring: Wilfrid Brambell; Barbara Windsor; Joan Sims; David Lodge; Graham Stark; Fred Emney; Ron Moody
- Cinematography: Billy Williams
- Edited by: Albert J. Gell
- Music by: Burnell Whibley
- Production company: Dormar Productions Ltd.
- Distributed by: British Lion (UK)
- Release date: September 5, 1965
- Running time: 55 minutes
- Country: United Kingdom
- Language: English

San Ferry Ann is a 1965 British sound effect comedy directed by Jeremy Summers with an ensemble cast including David Lodge, Joan Sims, Wilfrid Brambell, Rodney Bewes and Barbara Windsor. It was written and produced by Bob Kellett. Wordlessly, with soundtrack and sound effects, it tells the story of a holiday crossing from Dover to Calais. The title is a corruption of the French phrase "ça ne fait rien", meaning "it doesn't matter".

== Plot ==
A motley group of British characters ride the San Ferry Ann to France, where they embark on a weekend of calamity. A campervan family, led by Dad and Mum, create chaos from the moment they set their tyres on the shore, resulting in frequent run-ins with the Gendarmerie. Lewd Grandad finds his own misadventures with a newly acquainted friend, a crazy German ex-soldier. Also aboard for the ride is a saucy hitchhiker, who causes a few heads to turn, including that of a fellow traveller, who pursues her affection with comic results.

== Cast ==
- David Lodge as Dad
- Joan Sims as Mum
- Wilfrid Brambell as Grandad
- Barbara Windsor as hitchhiker
- Ron Moody as the German
- Ronnie Stevens as hitchhiker
- Rodney Bewes as lover boy
- Catherine Feller as lover girl
- Graham Stark as gendarme
- Lynne Carol as Grandma
- Warren Mitchell as Maitre d'Hotel
- Aubrey Woods as Immigration Officer
- Hugh Paddick as French commercial traveller
- Joan Sterndale-Bennett as madame
- Sandor Elès as shop attendant
- Fred Emney as gourmet
- Thomas Gallagher as gardener
- Barrie Gosney as mini Dad
- Paul Grist as Ship's Officer
- Bettine Le Beau as French War Museum attendant
- Andreas Malandrinos as garage mechanic
- Brian Murphy as British tourist in garage
- Henry Woolf as French van driver
- Tex Fuller as onion man (uncredited)

== Production ==
The film was a follow up to A Home of Your Own (1965) although Jay Lewis did not return.

== Critical reception ==
Monthly Film Bulletin said "A singularly unfunny attempt on the part of Dormar to follow up the success of their amusing little silent comedy A Home Of Your Own, this is the kind of film in which people go through the motions of being seasick in mime, and for which the soundtrack is so loud that the noise of air issuing from a punctured tyre is almost more than flesh and blood can stand. Full of lavatory jokes and based on the most crude and superficial observation, it indicates with some force that Jay Lewis (who directed and co-scripted the earlier film) and his photographer Denys Coop, were vital ingredients in what only seemed to be a simple success formula."

== Releases ==
The film appears on the 2021 Network Blu-ray anthology Futtocks End and Other Stories, along with A Home of Your Own (1965) and Vive le Sport (1969), all of which were produced by Kellett.
