= Fred Emney =

British actor (1900–1980)

- Born: Frederick Arthur Round Emney; 12 February 1900; Prescot, Lancashire, England, UK
- Died: 25 December 1980 (aged 80); Bognor Regis, Sussex, England, UK
- Occupation: Actor
- Spouse: Hazel Wiles

Frederick Arthur Round Emney (12 February 1900 – 25 December 1980) was an English character actor and comedian.

Emney was born in Prescot, Lancashire, the son of Blanche (née Round) and Fred Emney, a music hall entertainer. His great-uncle was the actor Arthur Williams. Emney junior grew up in London and was educated at Cranleigh School.

He made his film debut in 1935, having previously worked in music hall. He became a familiar figure to screen audiences, usually playing the "posh fat bloke", usually gruff and invariably wearing a monocle. During the 1950s, he had his own television show which featured sketches and deft piano pieces often composed by him. Some were released on record. He had a short spell as straight man to puppets Pinky and Perky.

His sister Joan Emney was an actress who sometimes appeared with him in the same stage productions.

Fred Emney died in Bognor Regis, Sussex, on Christmas Day 1980.

== Filmography ==
- A Man of Mayfair (1932) - (uncredited)
- Brewster's Millions (1935) - Freddy
- Come Out of the Pantry (1935) - Lord Axminster
- The Lilac Domino (1937) - Baron Ladislas de Gonda
- Let's Make a Night of It (1937) - Henry Boydell
- Jane Steps Out (1938) - General Wilton
- Hold My Hand (1938) - Lord Milchester
- Luck of the Navy (1938) - Cook
- Just like a Woman (1939) - Sir Charles Devoir
- Yes, Madam? (1939) - Sir Charles Drake-Drake
- She Couldn't Say No (1939) - Herbert
- The Middle Watch (1940) - Adm. Sir Reginald Hewett
- Just William (1940) - Mr. Brown
- Let the People Sing (1942) - Sir George Denberry-Baxter
- Fun at St. Fanny's (1955) - Dr. Jankers
- The Fast Lady (1962) - 1st Golfer
- A Home of Your Own (1964) - The Mayor
- Father Came Too! (1964) - Sir Francis Drake
- I've Gotta Horse (1965) - Lord Bentley
- Those Magnificent Men in Their Flying Machines (1965) - Colonel
- San Ferry Ann (1965) - Gourmet
- Bunny Lake Is Missing (1965) - Man in Soho
- The Sandwich Man (1966) - Sir Mervyn Moleskin
- Oliver! (1968) - Workhouse Chairman
- The Assassination Bureau (1969) - Elevator Victim (uncredited)
- Lock Up Your Daughters! (1969) - Earl of Ware
- The Italian Job (1969) - Birkinshaw
- The Magic Christian (1969) - Fitzgibbon
- Under the Table You Must Go (1969) - Himself (documentary)
- Doctor in Trouble (1970) - Father
- Up the Chastity Belt (1971) - Mortimer
- Mistress Pamela (1974) - Dr. Livesey
- The Amorous Milkman (1975) - Magistrate
- Adventures of a Private Eye (1977) - Sir Basil (final film role)
