= Percy Herbert (actor) =

English actor (1920–1992)

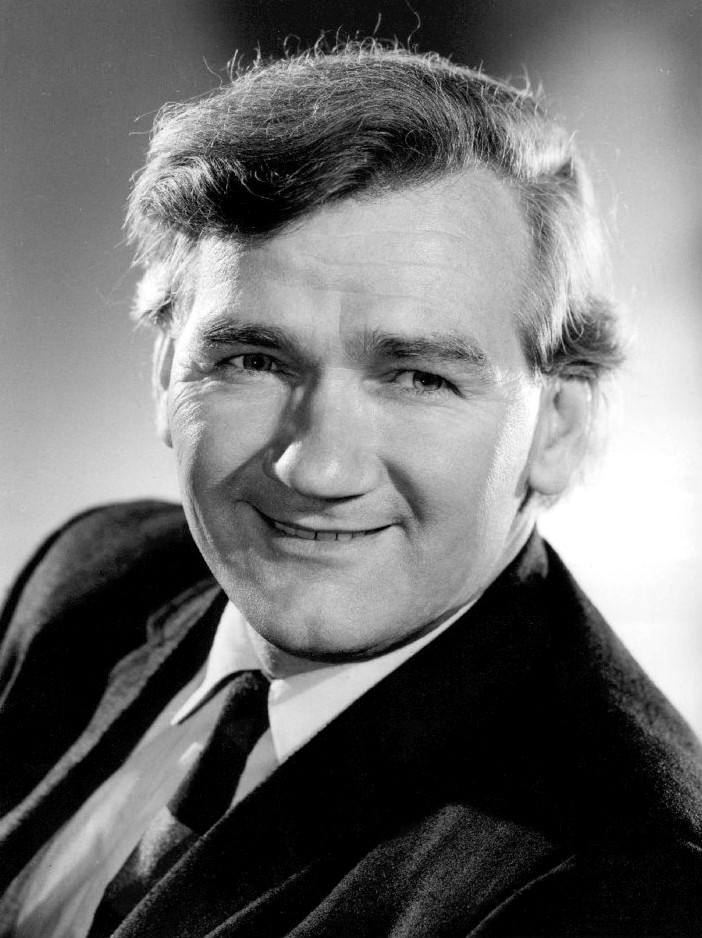
- Herbert in 1967
- Born: 31 July 1920; London, England
- Died: 6 December 1992 (aged 72); Kent, England
- Education: Royal Academy of Dramatic Art
- Occupation: Actor
- Years active: 1951–1987
- Spouse: Amy Lindsay (m. 1947)
- Children: 2

Percy Herbert (31 July 1920 – 6 December 1992) was an English actor.

== Early years ==
Herbert was born in east London. His father left home when Herbert was a young boy. The middle sibling, Herbert was brought up by his mother Ann Herbert along with his brother Lawrence and his sister Maisie. In his youth he learned boxing at Repton Boxing club.

== Acting career ==
Post-war he returned to London. Dame Sybil Thorndike helped him secure an interview with the Royal Academy of Dramatic Art where he won a scholarship. His acting work began in the theatre, including at John Gielgud's Old Vic Company.

Beginning in 1954, he went on to appear in 78 films. He often played soldiers including in The Cockleshell Heroes and The Bridge on the River Kwai. The Bridge on the River Kwai was about British POWs working on the Burma Railway (of which Herbert had living experience). Herbert as well as being cast as Grogan, he was paid by Producer David Lean as a consultant on the film. It was Herbert who suggested using the well-known "Colonel Bogey March" that prisoners whistle in the film.

His other notable war films include Sea of Sand, Tunes of Glory, The Guns of Navarone, Guns at Batasi, Tobruk and The Wild Geese.

He was equally at home in comedies (Barnacle Bill, Casino Royale, 3 Carry On films), fantasy (One Million Years B.C., Mysterious Island), drama (Becket, Bunny Lake is Missing), and science fiction (Quatermass 2, Night of the Big Heat).

He also acted on television; he was a regular on the short-lived American series Cimarron Strip, during a brief foray to Hollywood. Other television work included Danger Man (re-titled Secret Agent on American TV), The Saint, Z-Cars, Dixon of Dock Green and Worzel Gummidge.

== Death ==
Herbert died of a heart attack, aged 72, on 6 December 1992 in Broadstairs, Kent. He was survived by his childhood sweetheart and wife Amy, and his two daughters Vanessa and Katrina .

== Complete filmography ==
- I Done a Murder (1951, TV film) - The Rev. Christopher Spoke
- The Young Lovers (1954) - Richards (uncredited)
- Montserrat (1954, TV film) - Morales
- The Green Carnation (1954) - Casey O'Rourke
- One Good Turn (1955) - "Seen Enough" Boxing Spectator (uncredited)
- The Night My Number Came Up (1955) - R.E.M.E. Sergeant
- The Prisoner (1955) - Soldier (uncredited)
- Confession (1955) - Barman
- The Gold Express (1955)
- Timeslip (1955) - Assassin (uncredited)
- The Cockleshell Heroes (1955) - Marine Lomas
- Doctor at Sea (1955) - Helmsman (uncredited)
- Lost (1956) - Police Constable in Phone Box (uncredited)
- Child in the House (1956) - Det. Sgt. Taylor
- A Hill in Korea (1956) - Pte. Moon
- Tiger in the Smoke (1956) - Copper
- Quatermass 2 (1957) - Gorman
- The Steel Bayonet (1957) - Pte. Clark
- The Bridge on the River Kwai (1957) - Grogan
- Night of the Demon (1957) - Farmer (deleted from US print)
- Barnacle Bill (1957) - Tommy
- The Safecracker (1958) - Sergeant Harper
- No Time to Die (1958) - 1st British soldier
- Sea Fury (1958) - Walker
- Sea of Sand (1958) - 'Blanco' White
- Idol on Parade (1959) - Sgt. Hebrides
- The Square Ring (1959)
- The Hill (1959, TV film) - Reuben
- Serious Charge (1959) - Mr. Thompson
- Deadly Record (1959) - Belcher
- Yesterday's Enemy (1959) - Wilson
- The Devil's Disciple (1959) - Edict Sergeant
- Don't Panic Chaps! (1959) - Bolter
- A Touch of Larceny (1960) - (uncredited)
- The Challenge (1960) - Shop Steward
- There Was a Crooked Man (1960) - Prison Warden
- Tunes of Glory (1960) - RSM Riddick
- The Guns of Navarone (1961) - Sgt. Grogan
- Mysterious Island (1961) - Sergeant Pencroft
- Mutiny on the Bounty (1962) - Seaman Matthew Quintal
- The Captive City (1962) - Sgt. Maj. Reed
- Call Me Bwana (1963) - First Henchman
- The Cracksman (1963) - Nosher
- Carry On Jack (1963) - Mister Angel, Bo’sun
- Dr. Syn, Alias the Scarecrow (1963) - Dover Castle Jailer
- Becket (1964) - Baron
- Guns at Batasi (1964) - Colour Sgt. Ben Parkin
- The Counterfeit Constable (1964) - L'agent Baxter
- Carry On Cleo (1964) - Guard (uncredited)
- Joey Boy (1965) - Mad George Long
- Bunny Lake Is Missing (1965) - Policeman at Station
- Carry On Cowboy (1965) - Charlie, the Bartender
- One Million Years B.C. (1966) - Sakana
- Tobruk (1967) - Dolan
- Mister Ten Per Cent (1967) - Inspector Great
- The Viking Queen (1967) - Catus
- Casino Royale (1967) - 1st Piper
- Night of the Big Heat (1967) - Gerald Foster
- The Royal Hunt of the Sun (1969) - Diego
- One More Time (1970) - Mander
- Too Late the Hero (1970) - Sergeant Johnstone
- The Other Reg Varney (1970, TV film) - Various characters
- Captain Apache (1971) - Moon
- Man in the Wilderness (1971) - Fogarty
- Doomwatch (1972) - Constable Hartwell
- The Fiend (1972) - Commissionaire
- Up the Front (1972) - Cpl. Lovechild
- Black Snake (1973) - Joker Tierney
- The Mackintosh Man (1973) - Taafe
- Craze (1974) - Detective Constable Russet
- One of Our Dinosaurs Is Missing (1975) - Mr. Gibbons
- Metamorphosis Alpha (1976, TV film) - Thargon Commander
- Hardcore (1977) - Hubert
- Valentino (1977) - Studio Guard
- The Wild Geese (1978) - Keith
- The London Connection (1979) - Ship's Captain
- The Sea Wolves (1980) - Dennison
- Rules of Justice (1981, TV film) - George Lattimore
- The Love Child (1988) - Maurice
