= Charles Morgan (actor) =

Welsh actor (1909–1994)

- Born: Charles Walter Morgan; 21 July 1909; Bedwellty, Monmouthshire, Wales
- Died: May 1994 (aged 84); Surrey, England

Charles Morgan (21 July 1909 – May 1994) was a Welsh actor.

== Selected filmography ==
Film:

- Train of Events (1949) – Second plain clothes man (segment "The Actor")
- Radio Cab Murder (1954) – J. L. MacLaren
- The One That Got Away (1957) – Manager at Hucknall (uncredited)
- Hell Is a City (1960) – Laurie Lovett
- Cash on Demand (1961) – Det. Sgt. Collins (uncredited)
- The Day the Earth Caught Fire (1961) – Foreign Editor (uncredited)
- The Pot Carriers (1962) – Chief Disciplinary Prison Officer
- The Boys (1962) – Samuel Wallace
- Doctor Who (1967–1978) – Songsten / Gold Usher
- Duffer (1971) – Man Fighting
- Au Pair Girls (1972) – Fred
- Armaguedon (1977)
- Quincy's Quest (1979) – Narrator
- The Return of the Soldier (1982) – Weeping Man

Television:

- ITV Television Playhouse (1957) – Walter Thorman (1 episode)
- The New Adventures of Charlie Chan (1957) – Bellboy (1 episode)
- Charlesworth (1959) - Detective-Inspector Drew (1 episode)
- Emergency Ward 10 (1959) – Peter French (4 episodes)
- Boyd Q.C. (1960) – Superintendent Latham (1 episode)
- Spycatcher (1960) – Captain Murray (1 episode)
- Probation Officer (1960-62) – various roles (3 episodes)
- Ghost Squad (1962) – Captain (1 episode)
- Sergeant Cork (1963-66) – Superintendent Rodway (44 episodes)
- Sexton Blake (1969) – Inspector Davies (1 episode)
- Hadleigh (1969) – Sir Aubrey Stafax (1 episode)
- Bel Ami (1971) – Commissionaire Delarme (1 episode)
- Within These Walls (1974-78) – Ted Armitage (8 episodes)
- The Onedin Line (1977) – Vicar (2 episodes)
- Angels (1983) – Mr. Barker (2 episodes)
- Never the Twain (1983-86) – Claggit (2 episodes)
