= Bill Fraser =

Scottish actor (1908–1987)

- Fraser in 1966
- Born: William Simpson Fraser; 5 June 1908; Perth, Scotland
- Died: 9 September 1987 (aged 79); Bushey, Hertfordshire, England
- Resting place: St Paul's Churchyard, London, England
- Occupation: Actor
- Years active: 1938–1987
- Spouse: Pamela Cundell (m. 1981)

William Simpson Fraser (5 June 1908 – 9 September 1987) was a Scottish actor who appeared on stage, screen and television for many years. In 1986 he won the Laurence Olivier Award for Best Comedy Performance for his stage role in the play When We Are Married.

== Early life ==
Fraser was born in Perth and educated at Strathallan School. He began his career as a clerk in a bank before beginning to act. In the early days when acting work was scarce, Fraser was often penniless, frequently sleeping rough on the Embankment in London. Before the Second World War, he ran the Connaught Theatre in Worthing; when called up he served in a Royal Air Force Special Liaison Unit, reaching the rank of flight lieutenant, where he met and became friends with Eric Sykes. Just after the war a chance meeting in a London street led to Fraser's giving Sykes his first work as a writer for radio comedy and the two friends worked together many times over the following years. Fraser is also credited with giving Peter Cushing his first acting job.

== Career ==
Fraser often played irascible or belligerent characters on screen and had many roles as a policeman, soldier or judge. His first television appearance was on The Tony Hancock Show in 1956, after which he briefly became a regular actor on Hancock's Half Hour. He then joined The Army Game as Sgt Claude Snudge, followed by a sequel called Bootsie and Snudge. He also played Snudge in the 1964 series Foreign Affairs. Later comedic roles included parts in the TV dramatisation of The Secret Diary of Adrian Mole, Aged 13¾ as well as Ripping Yarns, The Train Now Standing, The Corn is Green and Father, Dear Father.

He also appeared in the comedy films The Amorous Milkman and Doctor at Large; the big-screen version of Love Thy Neighbour; and the Frankie Howerd trilogy Up Pompeii!, Up the Front and Up the Chastity Belt.

He had a recurring role on Rumpole of the Bailey as Judge Roger Bullingham, an unsympathetic, usually apoplectic judge privately nicknamed "the Mad Bull" by defence barrister Horace Rumpole.

Fraser's straight parts included Boanerges in The Apple Cart and Eddie Waters in Comedians, both for the BBC. He made appearances on The Professionals and The Avengers (as yet another eccentric, a blustery colonel). He also featured in the Doctor Who story Meglos in 1980, and appeared in the spin-off show K-9 and Company the following year. In the early 1980s, he was in two series of a straight drama on BBC1, Flesh and Blood; his performance in its first episode of an industrialist sitting at the bedside of his dying wife was regarded by many as a tour de force.

He appeared as Mr Micawber in the TV dramatisation of David Copperfield in 1966. He played Serjeant Buzzfuzz in the TV musical Pickwick for the BBC in 1969; and his last role was as Mr Casby in the film version of Little Dorrit (1988).

He was the subject of This Is Your Life in 1981 when he was surprised by Eamonn Andrews at the Royalty Theatre in London.

Fraser also appeared in an early advertisement for the Austin Metro. In 1985 he was cast as Bert Baxter in The Secret Diary of Adrian Mole.

During those periods when Fraser was not acting, he ran a small sweetshop and tobacconists at Ilford Lane in Ilford, Essex.

Bill Fraser played husband to Googie Withers in the Chichester Theatre production of Maugham's The Circle. It transferred to the West End and played at the Haymarket, and then toured Britain. Also in the cast were Susan Hampshire and John McCallum, who was married to Googie Withers.

== Awards ==
In 1986 he won the Laurence Olivier Award for Best Comedy Performance for his stage role in the play When We Are Married.

== Death ==
He died from emphysema in Bushey, Hertfordshire, aged 79, leaving a widow, the actress Pamela Cundell, whom he had married in 1981.

== Selected filmography ==
- Murder in the Family (1938) - Police Sergeant Feathers (uncredited)
- East of Piccadilly (1941) - Maxie
- The Common Touch (1941) - Harris
- Forbidden (1949) - Railway Porter (uncredited)
- Helter Skelter (1949) - Oliver Cromwell
- Meet Me Tonight (1952) - Bert Bentley: Red Peppers
- Lady in the Fog (1952) - Sales Manager
- Time Bomb (1953) - Constable J. Reed
- The Captain's Paradise (1953) - Absalom (taxi driver)
- Meet Mr. Lucifer (1953) - Band Leader
- Duel in the Jungle (1954) - Smith - Hotel Clerk
- The Barefoot Contessa (1954) - J. Montague Brown
- Orders Are Orders (1954) - Private Slee
- Alias John Preston (1955) - Joe Newton
- Jumping for Joy (1956) - Drunk in Pool Hall (uncredited)
- Charley Moon (1956) - Marber
- Doctor at Large (1957) - Minor Role (uncredited)
- Second Fiddle (1957) - Nixon
- Just My Luck (1957) - Powell (uncredited)
- Three Sundays to Live (1957) - Prison Warder (uncredited)
- Another Time, Another Place (1958) - R.E. Sergeant
- The Man Who Liked Funerals (1959) - Jeremy Bentham
- Doctor in Love (1960) - Police Sergeant (uncredited)
- The Fast Lady (1962) - 3rd Golfer (uncredited)
- What a Crazy World (1963) - Milligan
- The Americanization of Emily (1964) - Port Commander
- Joey Boy (1965) - Sgt. Maj. Dobbs
- A Home of Your Own (1965) - The Shop Steward
- Masquerade (1965) - Dunwoody
- A Touch of Uplift (1965) - Charles Trotter
- I've Gotta Horse (1965) - Mr. Bartholemew
- David Copperfield (1966) - Mr. Micawber
- Diamonds for Breakfast (1968) - Bookseller
- The Best House in London (1969) - Inspector MacPherson
- Captain Nemo and the Underwater City (1969) - Barnaby Bath
- All the Way Up (1970) - Arnold Makepiece
- Up Pompeii (1971) - Prosperus Maximus
- Up the Chastity Belt (1971) - Sir Braggart
- Up the Front (1972) - Groping
- That's Your Funeral (1972) - Basil Bulstrode
- Go for a Take (1972) - TV Studio Doorman
- Not Now Darling (1973) - Commissionaire
- Love Thy Neighbour (1973) - Mr. Granger (uncredited)
- Dead Cert (1974) - Uncle George
- Moments (1974) - Mr. Fleming
- The Amorous Milkman (1975) - Gerald
- Eye of the Needle (1981) - Mr. Porter
- Pirates (1986) - Governor
- Little Dorrit (1987) - Mr. Casby (final film role)
