= Joey Boy (film) =

1965 British comedy war film by Frank Launder

- Directed by: Frank Launder
- Written by: Frank Launder; Mike Watts (adaptation and screenplay)
- Based on: novel by Eddie Chapman
- Produced by: Sidney Gilliat
- Starring: Harry H. Corbett; Stanley Baxter; Bill Fraser; Percy Herbert; Lance Percival; Reg Varney
- Cinematography: Arthur Lavis
- Edited by: John Shirley
- Music by: Philip Green
- Production company: Temgrange
- Distributed by: British Lion Films
- Release date: 9 April 1965
- Running time: 91 minutes
- Country: United Kingdom
- Language: English

Joey Boy is a 1965 British comedy war film directed by Frank Launder and starring Harry H. Corbett, Stanley Baxter, Bill Fraser, Percy Herbert, Lance Percival and Reg Varney. It was based on the 1959 novel by Eddie Chapman.

== Synopsis ==
After a gang of London Spivs are arrested for running an illegal gambling den during the Second World War they are offered a choice between prison and a tour of duty with the British Army putting their unique talents to work.

== Cast ==
- Harry H. Corbett as Joey Boy Thompson
- Stanley Baxter as Benny 'The Kid' Lindowski
- Bill Fraser as Sergeant Major Dobbs
- Percy Herbert as Mad George Long
- Lance Percival as Clarence Doubleday
- Reg Varney as Rabbit Malone
- Moira Lister as Lady Thameridge
- Derek Nimmo as Lieutenant Hope
- Thorley Walters as Colonel Grant
- John Arnatt as Brigadier Charles Chapman
- Eric Pohlmann as Antonio
- John Phillips as Inspector Morgan
- Lloyd Lamble as Sir John Averycorn
- Edward Chapman as Tom Hobson
- Basil Dignam as General
- Vicki Woolf as Gina

== Production ==
British Lion had been owned by the Conservative government since December 1963. In 1964 the government had it denationalised. Joey Boy was among the films released by British Lion in its first year of independence. By November 1965 it was seeking re-nationalisation.

== Critical reception ==
The Monthly Film Bulletin wrote: "This laboured farce makes a peculiarly dispiriting addition to the list of Launder-Gilliat productions. The script, an anthology of clichés of barrack-room and wide-boy humour, interspersed with juvenile horseplay and tired vulgarity, is bereft of wit and originality. Since Frank Launder's sluggish direction fails to remedy these deficiencies, the film is as visually shoddy as it is unfunny. In the circumstances, it is not too surprising that Harry H. Corbett's central performance should resolve itself into an unpleasingly complacent display of mugging, and the experienced supporting players make equally little of their unpromising material. The film does perhaps perk up slightly with the visit of the parliamentary delegation, but only by comparison with the tedium of what has gone before, and the final shot (Harry H. Corbett pulling a lavatory chain) is all too crudely apt."

The Guardian called it a "hopelessly ramshackle vehicle" for Harry Corbett.

Kine Weekly wrote: "This comedy, lacking in variety, makes rather heavy going and does not begin to sparkle before the ladies appear on the scene."
