= Up Pompeii! =

British TV sitcom (1969–1991)

- Opening title
- Created by: Talbot Rothwell
- Written by: Talbot Rothwell; Sid Colin
- Starring: Frankie Howerd; Max Adrian; Elizabeth Larner; Kerry Gardner
- Composer: Alan Braden
- Country of origin: United Kingdom
- Original language: English
- No. of episodes: 16 (including Further Up Pompeii)

Production
- Producers: Michael Mills; David Croft; Sydney Lotterby
- Running time: 30–45 minutes

Original release
- Network: BBC1
- Release: 17 September 1969 – 26 October 1970

Up Pompeii! is a British television comedy series set in ancient Pompeii and broadcast between 1969 and 1970, starring Frankie Howerd. The first series was written by Talbot Rothwell, a scriptwriter for the Carry On films, and the second series by Rothwell and Sid Colin. Two later specials were transmitted in 1975 and 1991 and a film adaptation was released in 1971.

== Background ==
Up Pompeii! first appeared in the Comedy Playhouse series, after Michael Mills and Tom Sloan from BBC Comedy and Light Entertainment visited the ruins of Pompeii. Since Mills had recently seen Frankie Howerd in the stage musical A Funny Thing Happened on the Way to the Forum he casually remarked to Sloan that he half expected Howerd to suddenly appear round the corner. Sloan had replied 'Why not?', and the idea took root. Talbot Rothwell was invited to write a script and the designer Sally Hulke visited Pompeii with a sketch book and camera to ensure realism and authenticity.

A slight variation of this is related by Bill Cotton who, in a June 2000 interview with author Graham McCann, said the idea originated with Mills, then the BBC's Head of Comedy, after seeing Frankie Howerd in that same play.

There were concerns in the Corporation's copyright department that the parallels between the musical and the comedy series might lead to litigation over possible plagiarism, but Rothwell told the BBC that he had seen neither the stage musical nor its film adaptation.

== Plot ==
The series is set in ancient, pre-eruption Pompeii, with the players bearing Latinised names suggestive of their character. Howerd is the slave Lurcio (pronounced Lurk-io); his bumbling old master Ludicrus Sextus (Max Adrian, then Wallas Eaton), the promiscuous wife is Ammonia (Elizabeth Larner), their daughter Erotica (Georgina Moon) and their virginal son Nausius (Kerry Gardner). Other regulars are Senna the Soothsayer (Jeanne Mockford) who constantly warns of impending death and destruction and, in series one, Plautus (Willie Rushton) a semi-godlike figure, making pithy comments from a location somewhere between the clouds and Mount Olympus. Guest stars included several actresses from the Carry On film series, including Barbara Windsor, Wendy Richard and Valerie Leon.

The format was an exotic backdrop for an endless series of double entendres and risqué gags from Howerd, constantly breaking the fourth wall with asides to the live studio audience which go unheard by the other characters (a device harking back to classical theatre). He also bemoans the quality of his script, complaining the other players have the best lines. Each episode starts with a prologue from Howerd – which is invariably interrupted by the doom-laden warnings of Senna, or the demands of his master or mistress.

Thirteen 30-minute episodes were made, in two series (March – May and September – October 1970). In between there was also a 13-minute Up Pompeii segment in the 1970 Royal Television Gala Performance.

In addition, it had been preceded by a pilot episode (1969) as part of Comedy Playhouse, and it was followed up with two later special episodes both called Further Up Pompeii, one in 1975 and the other, written by Brian Leveson and Paul Minett, in 1991 (the former with, and the latter without exclamation mark). The latter sparked speculation that there could be a new series, but Howerd's death in 1992 put an end to any such prospect.

Apart from the change to the actor playing Ludicrus Sextus, there are some differences between the two series of Up Pompeii, the second series using noticeably fewer sets than the previous. This may have been due to the second series being commissioned, filmed and broadcast within four months from the end of the first.

== Films and sequels ==
The show inspired three films. The first was also called Up Pompeii (1971) and added such characters as Bilius, Voluptua, Scrubba and Villanus. It ended with the eruption of Mount Vesuvius, which anachronistically (for AD79) included Nero (who added, "Wait till you see what I've up for Rome!"), and had a brief epilogue in which Howerd played a modern-day museum guide showing the petrified remains of the Pompeiian characters. It was produced by Ned Sherrin and retained only Frankie Howerd from the cast of the original series (Ludicrus, for example, was played by Michael Hordern in the film adaptation, Erotica by Madeline Smith and Nausius by Royce Mills). However, Aubrey Woods appeared in the TV series and the film, playing different roles.

The two sequels were Up the Chastity Belt (1971) and Up the Front (1972) which transported Howerd's servile, cowardly character to Medieval times (as Lurkalot) and World War I (as Private Lurk). A few years later, the BBC made one final special called Further up Pompeii! (with exclamation mark) in 1975.

The format of Up Pompeii inspired three later TV series, Whoops Baghdad (1973) Up The Convicts (1976) for Australia's Channel 7 and Then Churchill Said to Me (1982), all starring Howerd. The later series was shelved due to the outbreak of the Falklands War and – thought politically insensitive – the series was aired in 1993, a year after Howerd's death.

A pilot episode for a US version of Up Pompeii for ABC, initially called The Pompeii Way but later renamed Up the toga, still starring Frankie Howerd and co-starring Foster Brooks, was recorded in 1971, but it did not proceed to a full series and was never shown. Publicity shots on Getty Images show that it involved the "Olympia Theatre Company", suggesting it may have been based on episode 5 of series 1 ("The actors"). The existence of this pilot was undocumented for a long time, until the publicity photographs were noticed online. For a long time, it was unclear if the program still existed, until a 16mm film copy was sold on eBay in late 2022.

The 1991 special Further up Pompeii (without exclamation mark) was made (by ITV/LWT) twenty years after the series had ended and by different writers. Lurcio is now a freedman with slaves of his own, but still has more than enough problems in his life. It could have served as a pilot episode for a revival of the series, but Howerd's death prevented that.

== Stage play ==
In 1988, Howerd asked one of his writers, Miles Tredinnick, to work on an updated stage version of Up Pompeii! for a proposed national UK tour, but the play was shelved when Howerd was offered a chance by Larry Gelbart to reprise his role as Pseudolus in A Funny Thing Happened on the Way to the Forum at the Piccadilly Theatre in London's West End. The play was eventually revised and updated and had its premiere in Chesterfield in January 2011 and then embarked on a UK tour. Produced and directed by Bruce James, it starred Damian Williams, host of Sky One's Are You Smarter than a 10 Year Old?, as Lurcio the slave. An acting edition of the play was published by Josef Weinberger Ltd in 2012.

== Audio revival ==
In 2019, British production company Spiteful Puppet celebrated the 50th anniversary of the broadcast of the "Comedy Playhouse" pilot by releasing an audio adaptation based on the stage play by Miles Tredinnick. The script was adapted by Barnaby Eaton-Jones, Daniel McGachey and Iain McLaughlin, with Eaton-Jones serving as producer and director of the live recording sessions at London's Shaw Theatre on 12 October. The two staged performances starred Madeline Smith as Ammonia, Frazer Hines as Ludicrus, Rosa Coduri as Erotica, Jack Lane as Nausius, Jilly Breeze as Senna, Ben Perkins as Corneus and Barnaby Eaton-Jones as Kretinus, with guest stars Cleo Rocos as Suspenda, Camille Coduri as Voluptua, and Tim Brooke-Taylor as Trecherus. The lead role of Lurcio was played in the manner of Frankie Howerd by David Benson, who had previously played Howerd on stage and radio. A double CD was released on 29 November.

== DVD release ==
For many years, no complete home video release had been undertaken due to the nature of the videotape master materials. Like many television series of this era, most of the original videotapes were wiped.

In the late 1970s, missing episodes of Up Pompeii! were found in the Canadian Broadcasting Corporation (CBC) archive. Because of the differences in international broadcasting, these copies had been converted to the North American NTSC television standard, and so one chunk of the series remained in its native PAL format, but the majority were found in a poorly-converted (dating long before digital conversion methods) NTSC state. The picture quality of some of the Canadian finds was not high, and so their marketability was severely limited. However, six episodes were released on VHS in 1991 by BBC Video. These tapes were re-released by Second Sight in 1999, with a small music edit made to the episode featuring Jamus Bondus.

In 2004–05, through the success of a group of BBC employees' restoration work on similar NTSC-only episodes of Doctor Who, the BBC decided to convert all their NTSC-only productions (as reclaimed from various international stations) back to their original PAL format using a new computer-controlled process, Reverse Standards Conversion. A PAL-like, higher-quality image resulted in a more stable picture. The newly restored masters made their debut on BBC FOUR in August 2006, and the BBC's DVD distribution arm 2entertain released a box-set of Series 1 and 2 - including the pilot episode - and the 1975 special as well as a brand new Frankie Howerd Collection set in mid-September.

“The Frankie Howerd Collection” set includes not only both original series of Up Pompeii!, but also the 1975 BBC special Further Up Pompeii! (not to be confused with the 1991 ITV special Further Up Pompeii), “The Best of Frankie Howerd” DVD, and another Howerd series along a similar vein, Then Churchill Said to Me.

== List of episodes ==
=== Pilot ===
Episode Title	Original Channel	Duration	Airdate
Comedy Playhouse: "Up Pompeii!"	BBC1	35 minutes	17 September 1969

=== Series 1 ===
Episode Title	Original Channel	Duration	Airdate
"Vestal Virgins"	BBC1	35 minutes	30 March 1970
"The Ides of March"	BBC1	35 minutes	6 April 1970
"The Senator and the Asp"	BBC1	35 minutes	13 April 1970
"Britannicus"	BBC1	35 minutes	20 April 1970
"The Actors"	BBC1	35 minutes	27 April 1970
"Spartacus"	BBC1	35 minutes	4 May 1970
"The Love Potion"	BBC1	35 minutes	11 May 1970

=== Series 2 ===
Episode Title	Original Channel	Duration	Airdate
"The Legacy"	BBC1	30 minutes	14 September 1970
"Roman Holiday"	BBC1	30 minutes	21 September 1970
"Jamus Bondus"	BBC1	30 minutes	28 September 1970
"The Peace Treaty"	BBC1	30 minutes	12 October 1970
"Nymphia"	BBC1	30 minutes	19 October 1970
"Exodus"	BBC1	30 minutes	26 October 1970

=== Specials ===
Episode Title	Original Channel	Duration	Airdate
Royal Television Gala Performance segment	BBC	13 minutes	24 May 1970
Further Up Pompeii!	BBC	45 minutes	31 March 1975
Further Up Pompeii	ITV/LWT	42 minutes	14 December 1991
Up the toga (AKA The Pompeii Way)	ABC (USA)	25 minutes	(recorded 1971)

=== Film ===
Title	Studio/ distributor	Duration	Release
Up Pompeii	Anglo-EMI	90 minutes	1971

== See also ==
- Up the Chastity Belt, a medieval spin-off film
- Up the Front, a World War I spin-off film
- Titter
- List of films based on British sitcoms
