= Don't Just Lie There, Say Something! =

1974 British film by Bob Kellett

- Theatrical release poster
- Directed by: Bob Kellett
- Written by: Michael Pertwee
- Based on: Don't Just Lie There, Say Something! by Michael Pertwee
- Produced by: Andrew Mitchell
- Starring: Brian Rix; Leslie Phillips; Joan Sims; Joanna Lumley; Katy Manning
- Cinematography: Jack Atcheler
- Edited by: Al Gell
- Music by: Peter Greenwell
- Production company: Comocroft Limited
- Distributed by: The Rank Organisation (UK)
- Release date: 14 March 1974
- Running time: 97 minutes
- Country: United Kingdom
- Language: English
- Budget: £138,000

Don't Just Lie There, Say Something! is a 1974 British comedy film directed by Bob Kellett and starring Brian Rix, Leslie Phillips, Joan Sims and Joanna Lumley. It was based on the Whitehall farce of the same title written by Michael Pertwee, who also wrote the screenplay. A government minister and his best friend take action in parliament against permissive behaviour in the United Kingdom.

== Plot summary ==
Sir William Mainwaring-Brown, a British Government Minister, puts forward a parliamentary Bill to battle "filth" (permissive behaviour) in the UK. However, that does not stop him having an affair with Wendy, the wife of a high-up reporter, as well as planning a one-night-stand with his secretary Miss Parkyn. Opponents of the Bill, mainly some hippies, led by Johnny, decide to kidnap the Minister's best friend and co-sponsor of the Bill, Barry Ovis, just as he is on the way to the church to marry his fiancée, Jean.

The intention is to discredit Barry Ovis by making it appear that he was involved in an orgy, thus removing any credibility that the Law and Order Bill might have had. Following a tip-off by Edith, one of the conspirators, the police raid the hippies' flat. Barry escapes before the police discover him and dashes back to Sir William's flat, followed by Edith.

Meanwhile, the Minister is also trying to use the flat to carry on his seduction of Miss Parkyn, only for Wendy to also appear by surprise. The Minister, Barry and Jean try to keep the truth from Inspector Ruff, who is searching for the missing Ovis, Wilfred Potts (an elderly anti-sleaze MP, who is staying temporarily in the adjoining flat) and Birdie (the Minister's wife). Not only that, but they have to try to deal with the hippies who do their utmost to discredit Mainwaring-Brown and Ovis. Naturally this causes no end of trouble.

== Cast ==
- Brian Rix as Barry Ovis
- Leslie Phillips as Sir William Mainwaring-Brown
- Joan Sims as Lady "Birdie" Mainwaring-Brown
- Joanna Lumley as Giselle Parkyn
- Derek Royle as Wilfred Potts
- Myra Frances as Jean
- Katy Manning as Damina
- Peter Bland as Inspector Ruff
- Anita Graham as Wendy
- Barrie Gosney as police sergeant
- Derek Griffiths as Johnny
- Corbet Woodall as TV newsreader
- David Battley as country yokel
- Gabrielle Daye as elderly lady
- Diane Langton as Angie
- Aubrey Woods as TV chairman

== Original play ==
The film was based on a play by Michael Pertwee which debuted in 1971 starring Brian Rix.

== Production ==
According to Brian Rix, Edward Dryhurst approached him in 1972 wanting to make a film version, claiming there was finance from The Rank Organisation. Pertwee wrote a script based on his play. After the truth emerged that Dryhurst did not have finance, Rix and Pertwee approached producer Andrew Mitchell, who along with director Bob Kellett raised the money from Rank. The low budget meant the film had to be made on location, including Kellett's office. Rix wrote: "It was chaos, but by cool management on the part of Andrew Mitchell and even cooler direction by Bob Kellett, a very passable film was made."

== Reception ==
According to Rix the film was very successful in South Africa. "We're sure it was", commented Filmink.

== Critical reception ==
The Monthly Film Bulletin wrote: "As a film, Don't Just Lie There is so unexceptionally mediocre as to be beneath constructive comment: a straight, dead celluloid rendering of the stage play, seventy-five percent of which has been shot in a single, three-room set. Brian Rix and Leslie Phillips project their decades-old personae, and the script manages with like somegenius to strike not a single underivative note as it treads through all the standard, degrading gags about falling trousers and rampant desire. The latter, of course, is never consummated – Phillips, middle-aged roué, apparently a great success with the ladies, runs in blind terror to his deodorants when his conquest begins to undress. It is only too ironic that writer Michael Pertwee should have chosen – in a vain and wholly misdirected attempt at topical allusion – to make his farce-hypocrites into politicians running a campaign against pornography. The pornographer, in Lawrence's phrase, does dirt on sex; the writer of dirty comedies, in his own way, does much the same thing."

Halliwell's Film Guide wrote: "stupefying from-the-stalls rendering of a successful stage farce; in this form it simply doesn't work".

Radio Times stated that the film "reduces the precise timing of the double entendres, the bedroom entrances and exits and the dropped-trouser misunderstandings to the level of clumsy contrivance, which not even the slickest of players can redeem".

== Television spin-off ==
The film was spun off into a sitcom, Men of Affairs, for ITV. The Leslie Phillips role went to Warren Mitchell.

== See also ==
- No Sex Please, We're British
