= Our Miss Fred =

- UK poster
- Directed by: Bob Kellett
- Written by: Hugh Leonard; Terence Feely
- Story by: Ted Willis
- Produced by: Josephine Douglas
- Starring: Danny La Rue; Alfred Marks; Lance Percival
- Cinematography: Dick Bush
- Edited by: David Campling
- Music by: Peter Greenwell
- Production company: Anglo-EMI
- Distributed by: Anglo-EMI
- Release date: 14 December 1972
- Running time: 96 minutes
- Country: United Kingdom
- Language: English

Our Miss Fred is a 1972 British comedy film starring Danny La Rue, set during World War II. The film was also known by its video release titles Beyond the Call of Duty (Canada) and Operation: Fred (US). In the 1960s, La Rue was one of the highest paid entertainers in Britain, but this represents his only starring role in a feature film.

== Plot ==
English Shakespearean actor now RASC Private Fred Wimbush is in the British army during the Battle of France. His skills result in his being asked to entertain the troops, but he is ordered to perform in drag. When the Germans capture his audience, he continues his disguise in women's clothes. Fred fears he will be shot as a spy. He has to fend off both French locals and German troops. The double entendres and bullets fly as he attempts his escape in the company of the pupils from an English girls' finishing school.

On a country lane he encounters Miss Flodden and Miss Lockhart who run an English girls' school. They ask him to fix their car ("Agatha") and is introduced to their five pupils on a tour of France: four English and one American, who are hiding in a barn. As the headmistress loudly declares that she loathes female impersonators and would gleefully turn them over to the Germans, Fred maintains his disguise. They suggest that Fred lose his flamboyant dress and instead dress as a teacher.

The English girls have a downed RAF airman, Squadron Leader Smallpiece hidden in a shed; Fred reveals his true identity to him. Fred steals a Nazi SS uniform to disguise Smallpiece. Fred drives around the French countryside with the girls encountering the Germans.

They head for an airfield and get in pretending to be a group of girls from the local brothel. Although they fail to catch a plane they attach "Agatha" to a barrage balloon and float off to safety.

Fred is recruited by the Special Operations Executive. In the final scene Fred, back in drag, is entertaining a group of Germans, singing "Hitler Has Only Got One Ball", though not to the tune of the Colonel Bogey March.

== Cast ==
- Danny La Rue as Fred Wimbush
- Alfred Marks as General Brincker
- Lance Percival as Squadron Leader Smallpiece
- Lally Bowers as Miss Flodden
- Frances de la Tour as Miss Lockhart
- Walter Gotell as Schmidt
- Kristin Hatfield as Hilary
- Jenny Twigge as Judith
- Vanessa Furse as Prunella
- Seretta Wilson as Elvira
- Sophie Batchelor as Emma
- John Barrard as Patron
- Nancy Nevinson as Patron's Wife
- Cyril Shaps as Doctor
- Frank Thornton as British Colonel
- André Maranne as French Resistance Fighter
- Barrie Gosney as Bertie
- David Ellen as Bobby
- Toni Palmer as Vendeuse
- Jennifer Croxton as Jeanette
- Anthony Sagar as R.S.M.
- Noel Coleman as Senior RAF officer
- Peter Greenwell as M.C.
- Gertan Klauber as German Officer

== Production ==
The film was constructed specifically as a vehicle for La Rue. It was one of a number of comedy star vehicles made by Nat Cohen at EMI Films. Filming took place in June 1972.

LaRue later wrote in his memoirs, "Before finally agreeing to appear in the movie, I must have turned down at least twenty-five other offers because they were almost all stories about female impersonations, which wasn’t for me." The performer admitted "I was a little apprehensive about making films. I was very definitely a live performer and I had reservations about transferring to the larger screen."

According to La Rue the film was the idea of Ted Willis, who persuaded him to make the film. La Rue wrote, " It was an interesting idea, a wartime comedy thriller, which never dates. It gave me the scope, not only for wearing glamorous outfits, but also the opportunity to prove myself as a serious actor as well, which I grabbed with both hands. It was a complete break away from my normal work." La Rue said he was particularly attracted by the fact his part "could have been taken by almost any actor and it wasn't necessarily a 'drag' role."

Filming took over ten weeks at Hertfordshire and Elstree Studios. La Rue found it difficult making movies, feeling they took up extra time and money.

== Reception ==
La Rue wrote "I was very pleased with the reaction. It was a new challenge for me and I felt at that time the best thing I had ever attempted." He said he received some good reviews and poor ones. "But I’m glad I made the film, although I certainly have no great desire to make another."

=== Box office ===
The film was a box office disappointment. Ned Sherrin, who directed a short, The Cobblers which was released in support of the film, said Our Miss Fred "turned out to be a big disaster".

=== Critical reception ===
In "The Spinning image", Graeme Clark called the film, "a goodnatured comedy which, while you can see why La Rue's prospects in cinema might have been limited, also proved he was no dead loss in front of the camera either." In the Radio Times, David McGillivray wrote, "Danny La Rue, Britain's most popular female impersonator during the 1970s, seems terribly constricted in his one major film, an old-fashioned wartime comedy written by distinguished playwright Hugh Leonard."

Psychotic Cinema wrote, "this is a fun movie with plenty of sexual innuendo jokes and a rousing rendition of the popular song Hitler Has Only Got One Ball." Movies About Girls wrote of La Rue, "he actually comes across remarkably well on screen...It’s all terrifically entertaining... La Rue can’t hide the fact that he’s loving every minute of it. You wouldn’t want him to either, because each and every smirk and grin means you can’t help but enjoy yourself along with him."

== Notes ==
- La Rue, Danny (1987). From drags to riches : my autobiography.
