= Up the Chastity Belt =

1971 British comedy film by Bob Kellett

- Australian poster
- Directed by: Bob Kellett
- Written by: Sid Colin; Ray Galton; Alan Simpson
- Produced by: Terry Glinwood; Ned Sherrin
- Starring: Frankie Howerd
- Cinematography: Ian Wilson
- Edited by: Al Gell
- Music by: Carl Davis
- Production company: Virgin Films
- Distributed by: Anglo-EMI
- Release date: 1971
- Running time: 94 min
- Country: United Kingdom
- Language: English
- Budget: £216,000

Up the Chastity Belt (US title: Naughty Knights; also known as The Chastity Belt) is a 1971 British comedy film directed by Bob Kellett and starring Frankie Howerd. It was written by Sid Colin, Ray Galton and Alan Simpson.

It was the second of three film spin-offs from the TV series Up Pompeii! (1969–1970), the first being Up Pompeii (1971), and the third Up the Front (1972).

== Plot ==
Eleanor of Aquitaine gives birth to twin sons, Lurkalot first and then Richard. But the nobles, led by Sir Braggart de Bombast, abduct baby Lurkalot and abandon him in a forest to die. He is raised by a family of pigs who belong to Sir Coward de Custard who takes him in as a serf. By way of remittance, Lurkalot aids his master by selling love potions and chastity belts as well as some unusual inventions in the local village, as Sir Coward is not a particularly successful noble. Lurkalot is also visited by strange "voices" in the middle of the night who speak to him and try to tell him who he really is, but get drowned out by events like lightning.

All grown up, Richard is bored of ruling England and decides to go on a crusade. Meanwhile, Sir Braggart de Bombast wants to acquire Sir Coward's lands and daughter for himself and makes him an offer. Sir Coward refuses but invites Sir Braggart and his followers to a banquet so as not to offend them, but refuses to toast Prince John. Offended, Sir Braggart challenges Sir Coward to a duel, with Lady Lobelia as the prize. Lurkalot, although not a knight, takes up the challenge as the "Man with no name" and defeats Sir Braggart's champion, Sir Grumbell de Grunt, with the aid of a giant magnet. Realising that the rules of chivalry have not been met, Sir Braggart declares the duel void and declares war. Lurkalot and Lady Lobelia flee to his workshop where to protect his master's daughter, he locks her up with a chastity belt.

Sir Coward responds to the challenge by running away to join the crusades, whilst Lurkalot, encouraged by his voices, goes to find both him and Richard the Lionheart. Once in the Holy Land, he discovers that the "crusades" are actually a Bacchanalian orgy, an excuse to leave the wives and families for a few years. Saladin is actually a friend of a crusader and started everything. Richard will not leave the Holy Land, as he is with Scheherazade and insists on trying every position in the Kama Sutra. Lurkalot's voices provide inspiration, and he takes all the unused weaponry and fashions them into chastity belts. He then brings feminism to Saladin's women, who go on strike, and Richard is forced to return home.

In Germany, Richard meets a local woman and decides to stay with her. He casually tosses Lurkalot the crown and says that if he looks like him, he can be him. Lurkalot returns home and attempts to rally the people, but he is recognised as Lurkalot and is accused of witchcraft following his earlier escape from the castle where he used his flying machine. After being ducked, he is sentenced to death by burning, but is rescued by Robin Hood. They plan an attack on Sir Braggart and are joined by Sir Coward, who is fed up with being bullied and fortified by smoking from a hookah pipe. Meanwhile, Richard has had to flee to England following an ignoble episode with his German woman and returns to Lurkalot's village, where he is captured by people mistaking him for Lurkalot.

Sir Coward feigns severe illness to get himself and Lurkalot into the castle, where they are incarcerated. He suffers withdrawal symptoms from the loss of his hookah and Lurkalot offers to make him a remedy based on sulphur and charcoal, but spills in saltpetre by accident. He mixes it together, but Sir Coward, who hates taking medicine, throws it in the direction of a fire, where it ignites and blows open the door. Lurkalot calls his new invention "gone powder" and they use it to open the castle gate so Robin Hood can attack. Meanwhile, Sir Braggart duels Lurkalot and reveals that he must be Richard's twin brother. The two battle all over the castle, and he is eventually forced to flee in disgrace. Richard then resumes his rule and everything is right in the land. He agrees to marry Lady Lobelia and makes Lurkalot a knight, but Lurkalot gets Lady Lobelia whilst Richard returns to Scheherazade.

== Cast ==
- Frankie Howerd as Lurkalot / Richard the Lionheart
- Graham Crowden as Sir Coward de Custard
- Bill Fraser as Sir Braggart de Bombast
- Hugh Paddick as Robin Hood
- Anna Quayle as Lady Ashfodel
- Eartha Kitt as Scheherazade
- Roy Hudd as Nick The Pick
- Godfrey Winn as Archbishop of All England
- Anne Aston as Lobelia
- Lance Percival as reporter
- Royce Mills as Knotweed
- Fred Emney as Mortimer
- Dave King as landlord of The Blue Boar
- David Prowse as Sir Grumbel de Grunt
- Nora Swinburne as lady in waiting
- Judy Huxtable as Gretel
- Lally Bowers as The Voice (voice)
- Derek Griffiths as Saladin
- Iain Cuthbertson as Teutonic knight
- Billy Walker as Chopper
- Rita Webb as Maid Marian
- Long John Baldry as Little John
- David Kernan as troubador
- Frank Thornton as master of ceremonies
- David Battley as yokel
- Chris Sandford as Mutch
- Norman Beaton as blacksmith
- Sam Kydd as locksmith
- John Gorman as 1st man-at-arms
- Aubrey Woods as vegetable stall owner
- Christopher Timothy as vendor
- Sammie Winmill as waitress
- Patricia Quinn as wife
- Ian Trigger as lucky charm seller

== Production ==
The film had investment from the Robert Stigwood Organisation. The initial treatment was done by Sid Cole. The writer of the TV series, Talbot Rothwell, was busy on Carry On films so the script was done by Galton and Simpson, who were clients of Beryl Vertue.

Frankie Howerd was on a percentage of the profits. He later wrote he "wasn’t all that happy with" the film despite its eventual financial success. He said the problem came when producer Ned Sherrin told him the film was running short so Galton and Simpson wrote extra material which turned out not to be needed. "The problem of editing these miles of film down to just an hour and a half of screen time enevitably resulted in a bit of a hodge podge", wrote Howerd.

The cast included Martin Woodhams, a boy who had been suspended from school for writing a "flippant" essay, who was cast as a naughty boy. The actors' union Equity protested against this as devaluing their profession.

It was the final film role of Godfrey Winn.

== Music ==
Eartha Kitt sings "A Knight for My Nights".

== Reception ==
=== Box office ===
The film was a financial success. It was one of the most popular movies of 1972 at the British box office. Producer Ned Sherrin said the film opened better than Up Pompeii (1971) but shortly after its release there was a power strike which hurt its momentum and the movie "did little more than recoup its investment."

=== Critical ===
The Monthly Film Bulletin wrote: "Even comedians of Howerd's genius are sadly at the mercy of their scriptwriters. But he is, to ape the style of the distributor's handout, still greater than the sum of his parts, and there are some delicious moments, such as his lightning transformation into a chanting nun ("Dolce vita ad nauseam...") in order to deceive a husband; or his confrontation with Rita Webb's appallingly gross Maid Marian ("Who is this fragile wood-nymph?")."

The Radio Times gave the film two out of five stars, finding "few comic highlights to brighten these 'dark ages' ".

Leslie Halliwell said: "Patchy pantomime which doesn't always have the courage of its own slapdash vulgarity."

== Sources ==
- Sherrin, Ned (2006). Ned Sherrin: the autobiography. London: Sphere. ISBN 978-0-7515-3424-5.
