= Up Pompeii (film) =

1971 British comedy film by Bob Kellett

- Theatrical poster
- Directed by: Bob Kellett
- Written by: Sid Colin
- Based on: an idea by Talbot Rothwell
- Produced by: Ned Sherrin
- Starring: Frankie Howerd; Michael Hordern; Barbara Murray
- Cinematography: Ian Wilson
- Edited by: Al Gell
- Music by: Carl Davis
- Production companies: Anglo-EMI; London Associated Films; Virgin Films
- Distributed by: MGM-EMI
- Release date: 11 March 1971
- Running time: 90 minutes
- Country: United Kingdom
- Language: English
- Budget: £200,000

Up Pompeii is a 1971 British historical sex comedy film directed by Bob Kellett and starring Frankie Howerd and Michael Hordern. It was written by Sid Colin based on an idea by Talbot Rothwell.

It is based on characters from the British television sitcom Up Pompeii! (1969–1975). There were two sequels: Up the Chastity Belt (1971), and Up the Front (1972).

== Plot ==
Lurcio becomes the inadvertent possessor of a scroll bearing all the names of the proposed assassins of Nero. The conspirators need to recover the scroll fast, but it has fallen into the hands of Lurcio's master, Ludicrus Sextus, who mistakenly reads the contents of the scroll to the Senate. Farcical attempts are made to retrieve the scroll before Pompeii is eventually consumed by the erupting Vesuvius.

== Cast ==
- Frankie Howerd as Lurcio
- Michael Hordern as Ludicrus Sextus
- Barbara Murray as Ammonia
- Patrick Cargill as Nero
- Lance Percival as Bilius
- Bill Fraser as Prosperus Maximus
- Julie Ege as Voluptua
- Adrienne Posta as Scrubba
- Bernard Bresslaw as Gorgo (Nero's Champion)
- Madeline Smith as Erotica
- Roy Hudd as Nero's M.C.
- Hugh Paddick as priest
- Royce Mills as Nausius
- Rita Webb as Cassandra
- Lally Bowers as Procuria
- Aubrey Woods as Villanus
- Billy Walker as Prodigious
- Russell Hunter as jailor
- Laraine Humphrys as Flavia
- Kenneth Cranham as 1st Christian
- George Woodbridge as fat bather
- Derek Griffiths as steam slave
- Robert Tayman as Noxius
- Carol Hawkins as Nero's girl
- Candace Glendenning as stone girl
- Ian Trigger as Odius

== Production ==
Ned Sherrin and Terry Glinwood formed Virgin Films, which made seven films beginning with this and its sequels.

Frankie Howerd's agent Beryl Vertue sold the idea of a film version of Up Pompeii to Nat Cohen. Sherrin wrote that Cohen "had spotted the potency of cheap TV spin-offs and was envious of the Boulting brothers’ success with Till Death Us Do Part (1968)." Cohen hired Sherrin to produce.

In May 1970 it was announced the film would be the first in a series of comedies produced by Ned Sherrin for Anglo-EMI, the second of which would be The Last Virgin Left Alive from a script by Eleanor Bron and John Fortune based on the novel Jam Today by Susan Barratt. Anglo-EMI's head Nat Cohen said "I am convinced the key to recapturing large cinema audiences is a good, uproarious comedy." The deal was negotiated by Vertue, a director of London Associated Films Limited with Cohen and Sherrin.

Sherrin felt "Frankie’s unique comic quality had never been captured on the screen. Nor did we, despite the ingenuity of the director, Bob Kellett, really manage to pin it down." Sherrin says this was because Howerd performed best in front of a live audience and struggled without it. "He was often very funny, particularly in the first two films of the series, but still a fraction of his commanding presence on stage."

Talbot Rothwell wrote the scripts to the television series but was busy writing Carry On movies so the screenplay was written by Sid Colin.

The Robert Stigwood Organisation had money in the film. In March 1972 Stigwood would buy out Virgin Films.

Filming took place at MGM-EMI Elstree Film Studios, Borehamwood, in August 1970. Billy Walker the boxer was given his first screen role. The producers were able to use left over sets from Julius Caesar (1970) which had just finished filming.

A version was made for American audiences with six minutes of additional footage including a prologue and epilogue and Lurcio setting the scene.

== Reception ==
=== Box office ===
The film was the 10th most popular film at the British box office in 1971. By June 1972 it had earned EMI a profit of £20,000.

=== Critical ===
The Monthly Film Bulletin wrote: "Although the screenplay is credited to Sid Colin, Up Pompeii is distinguishable only by its length from the TV comedy series written by Talbot Rothwell. The jokes are not merely similar but in some cases actually the same; and apart from the clumsily staged eruption of Vesuvius and collapse of Pompeii evidence of an attempt to translate television into cinema is slight. However, the cast is more illustrious than usual, and in addition to Frankie Howerd's asides, fans of the series have an extra treat in Patrick Cargill's accomplished portrayal of boredom in the person of the Emperor Nero."

Filmink called it "hugely fun".

The Radio Times Guide to Films gave the film 2/5 stars, writing: "Unfortunately, the blatantly obvious Carry On-style formula (the cast even features Carry On regular Bernard Bresslaw) only works sporadically. There's more interest in trying to put names to the plethora of familiar British faces in the cast, among them Patrick Cargill as the Emperor Nero and Michael Hordern as the unfortunate Ludicrus Sextus."

Leslie Halliwell said: "Yawnmaking spinoff of a lively TV comedy series: the jokes just lie there, and die there."

== See also ==
- A Funny Thing Happened on the Way to the Forum – 1966 musical film directed by Richard Lester

== Notes ==
- Sherrin, Ned (2006). Ned Sherrin : the autobiography. Time Warner. ISBN 9780751534245.
