= Up the Front =

1972 British comedy film by Bob Kellett

- Theatrical poster
- Directed by: Bob Kellett
- Written by: Sid Colin; Eddie Braben
- Produced by: Terry Glinwood; Ned Sherrin; Beryl Vertue
- Starring: Frankie Howerd; Bill Fraser; Hermione Baddeley
- Cinematography: Tony Spratling
- Edited by: Al Gell
- Music by: Peter Greenwell
- Production companies: Anglo-EMI; Virgin Films
- Distributed by: Anglo-EMI Film Distributors
- Release date: 14 July 1972
- Running time: 89 minutes
- Country: United Kingdom
- Language: English
- Budget: £200,000

Up the Front is a 1972 British comedy film directed by Bob Kellett and starring Frankie Howerd, Bill Fraser, and Hermione Baddeley. It was written by Sid Colin and Eddie Braben. Set during the First World War, it is the third film spin-off from the television series Up Pompeii!. The previous films were Up Pompeii (1971), set, like the TV series, in the Roman era, and Up the Chastity Belt (1971), set in the Middle Ages.

The plot concerns Lurk (a descendant of the slave Lurcio in Up Pompeii), a coward who is hypnotised into bravery.

== Plot ==
During the First World War, Lurk, a lowly servant in the household of Lord and Lady Twithampton, is hypnotised by The Great Vincento and travels to the Western Front to "save England". Lurk is inspired to bravery, and upon receiving the German master plan for the entire war, which has through an unlikely series of events been tattooed onto his posterior, is pursued across France by German intelligence.

After breaking into the British military headquarters to deliver the plans into the hands of General Burke, he is confronted by the sensuous German spy Mata Hari. After foiling Mata Hari's scheme to relieve him of the plans, a hilarious scene develops in which he is pursued by the nefarious Von Gutz and his henchmen Donner and Blitzen. Accompanied by the Can-Can, performed by the Famous Buttercup Girls, Lurk is pursued around the Allied headquarters. Finally, disguised as a tree, he is able to present the plans to General Burke, to the famous line:

General Burke: "Lurk, bend down".
Lurk: "I thought you'd never ask!"

Having successfully delivered the plans into the hands of British intelligence, Lurk receives a medal of honour and a promotion. He is therefore able to win the love of his beloved Fanny and defeat the machinations of the wicked Sgt. Major Groping.

== Cast ==
- Frankie Howerd as Lurk
- Bill Fraser as Groping
- Zsa Zsa Gabor as Mata Hari
- Stanley Holloway as The Great Vincento
- Hermione Baddeley as Monique
- Robert Coote as General Burke
- Lance Percival as Von Gutz
- Dora Bryan as Cora Crumpington
- William Mervyn as Lord Twithampton
- Linda Gray as Lady Twithampton
- Jonathan Cecil as Captain Nigel Phipps Fortescue
- Madeline Smith as Fanny
- Percy Herbert as Corporal Lovechild
- Peter Bull as General Von Kobler
- Vernon Dobtcheff as Muller
- Gertan Klauber as Donner
- Stanley Lebor as Blitzen
- Michael Brennan as M.P.
- Harvey Hall as M.P.
- David Battley as Midgeley the cook
- Derek Griffiths as El Puncturo
- Mike Grady as newsboy
- Bob Hoskins as Recruiting Sergeant
- Robert Gillespie as French Officer
- Patricia Quinn as Magda (Mata Hari's Maid)

Bob Hoskins' brief appearance in the film represents his mainstream debut.

== Production ==
Filming started January 1972. It was the first film script from Eddie Braben, a popular television writer.

Producer Ned Sherrin later recalled:

Filming the Ups was the easy side of film production. The money was there — usually just over £200,000 for a six-week schedule. There was an audience waiting for Frank. Bob Kellett knew how to handle actors and cameras. Terry Glinwood kept an eagle eye on progress and expenditure. My main role — apart from casting clever actor-friends in small parts — was to keep the visiting ‘cameo’ stars happy if Frank was fractious; and to keep him happy if they were funny. Both problems were usually solved by a congenial canteen lunch. I spent most of my time looking ahead and trying to set up future projects.

== Critical reception ==
The Monthly Film Bulletin wrote: "A far cry from the quite amiable Up the Chastity Belt, this is the most threadbare offering in Frankie Howerd's series, sadly short on wit and invention. A distinguished cast is given virtually nothing to do, and after ten minutes the script seizes up from a surfeit of strained puns. Under the circumstances, it is a pleasant surprise to find that the film constantly looks so attractive. Some beautifully designed interiors, swamped in colour, and a striking, studio-built impression of the battleground signal Seamus Flannery as an art director well worth watching."

The New York Times wrote that "the laughs come fast and furious when Howerd finds himself the recipient of the enemy's war plans--tattooed on his tush". TV Guide called the film "inane nonsense".

Leslie Halliwell said: "Threadbare end-of-the-pier romp."

The Radio Times Guide to Films gave the film 1/5 stars, writing: "The final film to be spun off from TV's Up Pompeii leaves Frankie Howerd stranded in the middle of no man's land with nothing more than a tattoo to cover his blushes. Not even Morecambe and Wise's regular writer Eddie Braben could do anything to pep up Sid Colin's desperate script, while the lacklustre performances really merit reproach."

== Box office ==
Ned Sherrin called it "by far the least successful of the series, hastily concocted and released too soon after Chastity Belt." Filmink argued "another reason may have been that WWI is a little too gloomy and traumatic in the memory for a comedy."
