= Futtocks End =

1970 British film by Bob Kellett

- Blu-ray cover
- Directed by: Bob Kellett
- Screenplay by: Ronnie Barker
- Produced by: Bob Kellett
- Starring: Michael Hordern; Ronnie Barker; Roger Livesey; Julian Orchard; Kika Markham; Richard O'Sullivan; Mary Merrall; Hilary Pritchard; Jennifer Cox; Ernest C. Jennings
- Music by: Robert Sharples
- Production companies: David Paradine Films, Gannet Films
- Release date: February 1970
- Running time: 45 minutes

Futtocks End is a 1970 British comedy short film directed by Bob Kellett and starring Ronnie Barker, Michael Hordern, Roger Livesey and Julian Orchard. It was written by Barker. Almost entirely without dialogue, the film includes a musical score, sound effects and incoherent mutterings.

== Plot ==
The story revolves around a weekend gathering at the decaying country home of the eccentric and lewd Sir Giles Futtock and the series of saucy mishaps between the staff and his guests.

== Cast ==
- Ronnie Barker as Sir Giles Futtock
- Michael Hordern as Hawk, the butler
- Roger Livesey as Old Jack, the artist
- Julian Orchard as Lord Twist, the twit
- Kika Markham as Lesley, the niece
- Mary Merrall as Fern Brassett, the aunt
- Hilary Pritchard as Carol Singer, the photographic model
- Peggy Ann Clifford as cook
- Richard O'Sullivan as the boots
- Jennifer Cox as Effie, the parlour maid
- Suzanne Togni as Tweenie
- Sammie Winmill as Tweenie
- Kim Kee Lim as Asian man
- Aubrey Woods as the postman

Sir Giles Futtock is another variation on Barker's Lord Rustless character.

== Production ==
It was filmed at Grim's Dyke, the former home of W. S. Gilbert, now a hotel.

== Critical reception ==
The Monthly Film Bulletin wrote: "Like Rhubarb, this comedy featurette dispenses with all dialogue except for a series of mumbled noises and squeaks (the rest of the track consists of loud sound effects and a continuous, undistinguished score). Though one or two small gags work quite nicely (as Sir Giles reads a letter in the shower the water removes the writing), they are far too thinly spread, and the whole venture reeks of ancient music hall jokes. The cast seem to be enjoying themselves, but their over-emphatic performances and bits of speeded-up action hardly communicate the fun to the audience."

British film critic Leslie Halliwell said: "A collection of visual gags, rather thinly spread, with dialogue replaced by squeaks and mumblings. Like all Barker's subsequent comedies on similar lines (The Picnic, By the Sea, etc) one chuckles in constant anticipation of guffaws which never come."

Writing in The Observer, Clive James likened the film to being "given a lolly to suck".

== Releases ==
In 1979 the film was shown, with no prior announcement or explanation, by the BBC in the middle of that year's Miss World broadcast. The programme had in fact been affected by industrial action by sound engineers.

The film was released on DVD in June 2006 together with an audio commentary by the producer-director Bob Kellett. It was shown in Trafalgar Square as part of the 2007 St George's Day celebrations.

On 5 July 2021, Network Distributing released a remastered edition of the film, together with Kellett's 2006 commentary and an 11-minute home movie edition, on DVD and Blu-ray anthology Futtocks End and Other Short Stories. The "other short stories" referred to in the title are three other short films produced by Kellett: San Ferry Ann, A Home of Your Own (which also co-starred Barker, and is cited in Kellettt's commentary as an inspiration for Futtocks End), and Vive le Sport. All of these films are remastered in 2K from their original film elements. The complete script appears in All I Ever Wrote by Ronnie Barker (Sidgwick & Jackson Ltd, 2001), as well as Fork Handles: The Bery Vest of Ronnie Barker (Ebury Press, 2013). The script contains some differences from the finished film. As Kellett explains in his commentary, dialogue during the establishing scenes was dropped in favour of an entirely wordless approach. A garden fête scene later in the script was omitted for budgetary reasons.
