= Royce Mills =

English actor (1942–2019)

- Born: Anthony Royce Mills; 12 May 1942; Tetbury, Gloucestershire, England
- Died: 21 May 2019 (aged 77)
- Occupation: Actor
- Spouse: Una Mills (divorced)
- Partner: Emma Taylor
- Children: 4

Anthony Royce Mills (12 May 1942 – 21 May 2019) was an English television, stage and film actor.

== Life and career ==
Born in Tetbury, Gloucestershire to Herbert Mills and concert pianist Winifred, Royce did not feel the need to look into the disappearance of his father. He and his mother moved to Eastbourne, and he made his television debut aged 13 on the BBC's Children's Hour in 1956. He attended Eastbourne College working in their kitchens to pay for his education. He then became an assistant to comedian Sandy Powell, getting him hungover when he filled pint glasses with beer instead of tinted water, and was fired. Sandy's wife Kay, however, let him announce her husband's stage entrance, for which he wore the long aprons Royce used in the kitchens in order to cover his damaged feet. He then began his longtime hobby of painting and was offered the Carleton Hobbs Bursary, but declined. In 1969 he made his acting debut in Oh, Brother!.

In later years he proved himself to be among the finest pantomime dames in the country, notably in his appearances at the Yvonne Arnaud Theatre, Guildford. He considered Morecambe and Wise to be the most generous people he had worked with, allowing him to perform Bring Me Sunshine on his own to give him a chance to shine. He also rehearsed Frankie Howerd’s lines for Up Pompeii, and improvised a sketch for The Les Dawson Show when time ran over during filming.

In 1984 Royce began voicing the Daleks in Doctor Who, after being asked by director of Resurrection of the Daleks, Matthew Robinson. He would hold his nose to perform the role, for which he maintained it was his best-known, and voiced them in Resurrection of the Daleks, 1985’s Revelation of the Daleks and 1988’s Remembrance of the Daleks, although he only had the one voice that he used. He died on 21 May 2019, aged 77.

== Filmography ==
Film
| Year | Title | Role | Notes |
|---|---|---|---|
| 1971 | Up Pompeii | Nausius | |
| 1971 | Sunday Bloody Sunday | Bob's Partner | |
| 1972 | Up the Chastity Belt | Knotweed | |
| 1979 | The Knowledge | Taxi Driver | |
| 1981 | History of the World, Part I | Duke D'Honnefleur | (The French Revolution) |
| 1984 | Real Life | Andrew Bazzard | |
| 2012 | Run for Your Wife | Man in Church Hall | (final film role) |
Television
| Year | Title | Role | Notes |
| 1969 | Oh Brother! | | 1 episode |
| 1969 | Play of the Month | Phillip Drummond | Episode “Charlie’s Aunt” |
| 1969–1970 | Fraud Squad | Various | 2 episodes |
| 1970 | Doctor in the House | Dr. Dave Peters | 1 epísode |
| 1970 | Hark at Barker | Trouserless Man | Episode “Rustless on Law” |
| 1970 | Comedy Playhouse | Grahame Toms | Episode “Weren’t You Marcia Honeywell?” |
| 1973 | Armchair Theatre | Usher | 1 episode |
| 1974–1981 | The Dick Emery Show | Various | 6 episodes |
| 1975 | Look, Mike Yarwood! | Various | 1975 Christmas Special |
| 1977 | The Tomorrow People | Dr. Taylor | 1 episode |
| 1977 | Rainbow | Cross Man | Episode “Cross” |
| 1977–1979 | Mike Yarwood in Persons | Various | 3 episodes |
| 1978–1980 | Rings on Their Fingers | Ken / Graham | 2 episodes |
| 1978 | The Les Dawson Show | Various | Episode 2 |
| 1979 | Sykes | Dr. Pinto | 1 episode |
| 1981 | Crossroads | Gilbert Latham | 25 episodes |
| 1982 | Kelly Monteith | Various | 2 episodes |
| 1982–1986 | The Kenny Everett Television Show | Various | 4 episodes |
| 1984–1988 | Doctor Who | Dalek | Voice, 7 episodes |
| 1984–1989 | Minder | Andrew | 4 episodes |
| 1985 | Alice in Wonderland | Dormouse | Voice, 2 episodes |
| 1986 | The Bob Monkhouse Show | Hooray Henry | 1 episode |
| 1987 | Edward and Friends | Voices | 28 episodes |
| 1990 | Never the Twain | First Man | Episode “X Marks the Spot” |
| 1991 | The Bill | Mahon | Episode “Machines” |
| 1992 | Keeping Up Appearances | Dorian | 1 episode |
| 1999 | Polterguests | Mr. Diprose | Episode 2 “Hee Haw Hotel” |
| 2001 | Bernard's Watch | Mr. Arnold | Episode “Running on Time” |
| 2002 | Spooks | Toby McInnes | Uncredited, 1 episode |
Radio
| 1969 | After All, We Have Got the Money | with Michael Deacon | Radio play |
| 1969 | A Day Among Many | Unknown | Radio play |
| 1979 | My Sainted Aunt | Unknown | Episode 2 “Not Now, Voyager!” |
| 1979 | Tony’s | Guest | 1 episode |
| 1981 | Give or Take | Unknown | 1 episode |
| 1981 | Out of My Head | Resident of Chris Allen's mind | Radio play |
| 1984 | The Demon Cakestand of Beestly Chase | Unknown | Radio play |
| 1985 | Brogue Male | Hubert Carstairs | 4 episodes |
| 1986–1987 | The Phenomenon Squad | Sigaloff | 6 episodes |
| 1987 | Tales from the Mausoleum Club | Clarence Green | 6 episodes |
| 1987–1989 | Blandings | Various | 14 episodes |
| 1987 | Starring Leslie Willey | Dudley Millington | Episode 1 “The Play Music” |
| 1990 | Gorby: The Man and his Music | Unknown | 2 episodes |
| 1991 | A Glass of Blessings | Gerald Beamish | 2 episodes |
| 1992 | Robbing Hood | Pettigrew | Episode 2 “Norman Delivers the Goods” |
| 1993 | A Perfect Spy | Nigel | 6 episodes |
| 1998 | Ben Sees it Through | Unknown | Radio play |
| 1999 | Bristow | Unknown | Episode 1 “When Melancholy Autumn Comes to Chester-Perry” |
| 2000 | Each Way Yankee | Peter and George | Radio play |
| 2010 | The Diabolical Gourmet | Chavette | Radio play |
