= Ned Sherrin =

Author and broadcaster (1931–2007)

Ned Sherrin CBE
- Ned Sherrin
- Born: Edward George Sherrin; 18 February 1931; Low Ham, Somerset, England
- Died: 1 October 2007 (aged 76); Chelsea, London, England
- Occupations: Broadcaster, author and stage director

Edward George Sherrin CBE (18 February 1931 – 1 October 2007) was an English broadcaster, author and stage director. He qualified as a barrister and then worked in independent television before joining the BBC. He appeared in a variety of radio and television satirical shows and theatre shows, some of which he also directed and produced.

== Early life ==
Sherrin was born at Gawlers Farm, Low Ham, Somerset, the second son of smallholding farmer Thomas Adam Sherrin (1889–1965) and Dorothy Finch (née Drewett; 1895–1980). He was educated at Sexey's School, in Bruton, Somerset, and rendered his national service in the Royal Signals, being commissioned as an officer in 1950.

Although he read law at Exeter College, Oxford, and subsequently qualified as a barrister (called to the bar by Gray's Inn), he became involved in theatre at Oxford and joined British television in 1956 shortly after the founding of independent television, producing shows for ATV in Birmingham.

== Career ==
Sherrin joined the BBC in 1957 as a temporary production assistant, then began working for them as a producer in Television Talks in 1963. Specialising in satirical shows, he worked extensively in film production and television.

In 1962, Sherrin was responsible for the first satirical television series That Was The Week That Was starring David Frost and Millicent Martin, and its successors Not So Much a Programme, More a Way of Life (1964–1965) and BBC-3 (1965–1966). In 1990 he was a contestant on Cluedo, facing off against Thelma Barlow. His other shows and films included Up Pompeii! (1969–1991), Up the Front (1972), The Cobblers of Umbridge, World in Ferment (1969), and The Virgin Soldiers (1969). In 1978, he also hosted We Interrupt This Week, a lively and humorous news events quiz featuring two teams of well-known journalists and columnists sparring against one another. The show was a production of WNET/Channel 13 New York.

Sherrin produced and directed many theatre productions in London's West End, including Jeffrey Bernard is Unwell and the musical revue Side by Side by Sondheim. He received an Olivier Award in 1984 for directing and conceiving The Ratepayers' Iolanthe, an adaptation by Sherrin and Alistair Beaton of the Gilbert and Sullivan opera Iolanthe. Sherrin played the part of Addison in the film Orlando (1992).

On BBC Radio 4, from 1986, Sherrin presented the light entertainment show Loose Ends on Saturday mornings (latterly evenings), and Counterpoint (1986–2006), a quiz show about all types of music, until forced off the air when his voice succumbed to throat cancer.

Sherrin also toured the UK with his one-man show An Evening of Theatrical Anecdotes.

Sherrin wrote two volumes of autobiography, several books of quotations and anecdotes, as well as some fiction; and several works in collaboration with Caryl Brahms.

== Personal life ==
Openly gay, Sherrin was a patron of the London Gay Symphony Orchestra, as well as the Stephen Sondheim Society of Singapore up until 1995. He was awarded a CBE in the 1997 New Year Honours. He was diagnosed with unilateral vocal cord paralysis in January 2007; this diagnosis was later changed to one of throat cancer, from which he died on 1 October 2007, aged 76.

== Selected works ==
- Sherrin, Ned (1983). A Small Thing – Like an Earthquake. London: Weidenfeld and Nicolson.
- Sherrin, Ned; Shand, Neil (1984). 1956 and All That: a memorable history of England since the war to end all wars (Two). London: M Joseph.
- Sherrin, Ned (1984). Cutting Edge, or, "Back in the Knife-Box, Miss Sharp": Ned Sherrin's anthology of wit. London: J M Dent.
- Brahms, Caryl; Sherrin, Ned (1984). Song by Song: the lives and work of 14 great lyric writers. Egerton, Bolton: R Anderson Publications.
- Brahms, Caryl; Sherrin, Ned (1986). Too Dirty for the Windmill. London: Constable. ISBN 9780094663800.
- Sherrin, Ned (1991). Ned Sherrin's Theatrical Anecdotes: a connoisseur's collection of legends, stories, and gossip. London: Virgin.
- Sherrin, Ned (1993). Ned Sherrin in his Anecdotage: a classic collection from the master raconteur. London: Virgin.
- Sherrin, Ned (1995). The Oxford Dictionary of Humorous Quotations. Oxford; New York: Oxford University Press.
- Sherrin, Ned (1996). Sherrin's Year. London: Virgin.
- Sherrin, Ned (1996). Scratch an Actor. London: Sinclair-Stevenson.
- Brahms, Caryl; Sherrin, Ned (1998). The Mitford Girls: a musical. London: Warner/Chappell Music.
- Sherrin, Ned (2004). I Wish I'd Said That. New York: Oxford University Press.
- Sherrin, Ned (2005). Ned Sherrin: the autobiography. London: Little, Brown.
- Frost, David; Sherrin, Ned (1963). That Was the Week That Was. London: W H Allen.
