= Miles Tredinnick =

- Also known as: Riff Regan
- Born: 18 February 1955 (age 71); Warrington, England
- Genre: Rock
- Occupations: Musician, songwriter and a stage and screenwriter
- Member of: London

Miles Tredinnick, also known as Riff Regan, (born Warrington 18 February 1955) is a rock musician, songwriter and a stage and screenwriter. In the 1970s, he was the lead singer with the British rock band London. Afterwards he went on to write comedy plays for the stage. He has also written scripts for Frankie Howerd, including the television special Superfrank! and the stage comedy Up Pompeii!

== Rock musician ==
In 1976, with drummer Jon Moss, guitarist Dave Wight (real name Colin Wight) and bassist Steve Voice, Tredinnick formed the punk band London. He was the lead singer Riff Regan. The band came to the notice of Danny Morgan who was a talent scout for ex-Yardbirds and ex-Marc Bolan manager Simon Napier-Bell. He secured them a record deal with MCA Records and a nationwide tour supporting The Stranglers. Their singles "Everyone’s A Winner", "Summer of Love"/"Friday on My Mind" and "Animal Games" and their one and only album Animal Games were all produced by Napier-Bell at the IBC Studios in London. Their recording of "Friday on My Mind" was made in the same studio that The Easybeats had made the original.

Although London had a popular live stage act, ticket sales never transformed into record sales. This was despite flamboyant film director Mike Mansfield directing the video for "Everyone's A Winner". The highest UK chart position they reached was 52 for their EP Summer of Love. Jon Moss was particularly impatient to have chart success and following a nationwide tour the band decided to call it a day. They broke up after a farewell gig at the Marquee Club in Wardour Street. Jon Moss joined The Damned and later formed Culture Club with Boy George; Colin Wight became a Professor in International Politics; Steve Voice formed The Original Vampires; Simon Napier-Bell went on to manage George Michael and Wham!.

Tredinnick, as Riff Regan, released four more singles on MCA Records; "All The Nice Boys And Girls in the World" (produced by Napier-Bell), "Japanese Girls" (produced by Andy Miller), "You Call Me Lucky" and "The Only One" (both produced by Liam Sternberg) before recording "Hard Hearts Don’t Cry" (produced by Andy Miller) on Epic Records in 1981. In August 2015 his first solo album Milestones was released on Beach Café Records.

In 1997, Captain Oi! Records released a best of London CD called London The Punk Rock Collection. It contains all the band's MCA recordings.

Tredinnick also co-wrote the song "Hottest Woman in Town" with Andy Miller in 1982. Recorded at London's Trident Studios by ex-Ozzy Osbourne and Ian Gillan lead guitarist Bernie Torme, it was released as a single and featured on the "Metal Killers" album.

In 2007 he reformed London with original bass player Steve Voice and new guitarist Hugh O'Donnell and new drummer Colin Watterston. The band played their first London gig in over 30 years at the 12 Bar Club in Soho, London on Saturday 23 February 2008. Reboot, their first studio album in 34 years, was released in February 2012 and The Hell for Leather Mob album was released in July 2020.

== Theatre and television ==
Tredinnick's first stage play, Because of Mr Darrow, was produced at the Finborough Theatre in London and his second comedy Laugh? I Nearly Went To Miami! had a successful fringe run at the Pentameters Theatre in Hampstead. The latter was later produced for the first Liverpool Festival of Comedy.

In translation, Laugh? I Nearly Went To Miami! has been produced in many cities, including Vienna, where its title was ...Und Morgen Fliegen Wir Nach Miami. British Director Cyril Frankel directed with German translation by Adolf Opel.

In 1990, Tredinnick wrote the stage thriller Twist. This was translated into German by Ursula Grutzmacher-Tabori under the title Der Letzte Dreh and was later produced in London under the title Getting Away with Murder at the Pentameters Theatre in Hampstead. The play had its US debut in Taunton, Massachusetts in 2010 and an acting edition was published by Josef Weinberger Plays in 2019.

His next stage comedy was It's Now or Never! in 1994. Directed by Marina Calderone at the Queen's Theatre, Hornchurch, England, it starred Tony Roper, Peter Polycarpou and Leyton Sommers as Elvis Presley. A German version, Jetzt Oder Nie, translated by Christian Wolffer has been successful as has a Dutch version translated by Martine Deboosere.

Topless, a one-woman play set on an open-top London sightseeing bus, followed in 1999. Produced by The Big Bus Company, this unique theatrical piece was actually performed, with audience, on top of a sightseeing bus driving through the streets of the West End of London. This was followed by Topless in Philadelphia (2009) featuring a male tour guide giving an open-top bus tour in America's most historical city and then Topless in Sydney (2014) and Topless in Las Vegas (2018).

=== Frankie Howerd ===
From 1985 to 1992 Tredinnick wrote regular stage and television scripts for Frankie Howerd including co-writing the hour long special, Superfrank! for Channel 4. He also wrote an updated stage version of Up Pompeii! although a proposed tour was put on the shelf when Howerd was offered a chance by Larry Gelbart to reprise his role as Pseudolus in A Funny Thing Happened on the Way to the Forum at the Piccadilly Theatre in London's West End. The new play, now revised and updated, received its premiere in Chesterfield in January 2011 before embarking on a UK tour. Produced and directed by Bruce James, it starred Damian Williams, host of Sky One's Are You Smarter Than A Ten Year Old?, as Lurcio the slave. An acting edition of the play was published by Josef Weinberger Ltd in 2012.

=== Television ===
In 1987/8 Tredinnick created and wrote the BBC1 comedy series Wyatt's Watchdogs. Produced and directed by Alan J W Bell, it starred Brian Wilde and Trevor Bannister. In 1992 he joined the Alomo/BBCTV show Birds of a Feather as a writer on series 4.

== Other work ==
In 1986 Tredinnick started writing for the international Disney Magazine creating cartoon stories for Mickey Mouse, Donald Duck, Goofy and other well-known Walt Disney characters.

His first novel Fripp, was published in 2001. A Kindle ebook version was published in 2011.

== Bibliography ==
- Laugh? I Nearly Went To Miami! (1986 Samuel French Ltd) ISBN 0-573-01633-X
- Und Morgen Fliegen Wir Nach Miami – German version of Laugh? Miami! with Ursula Lyn and Adolf Opel. (1988 Gerhard Pegler Plays)
- Walt Disney Magazine (1986–1991 GPS Publishing)
- We Hebben Zien Vlieggen! – Dutch version of Laugh? Miami! with Martine Deboosere. (1991 Toneelfonds) ISBN 90-385-0081-5
- It's Now Or Never! (1991 Warner Chappell Ltd) ISBN 0-85676-148-6
- Jetzt Oder Nie – German version of It's Now Or Never! with Christian Wolffer. (1996 Vertriebsstelle)
- It's Now Or Never! – Dutch version with Martine Deboosere. (1997 Toneelfonds) ISBN 90-385-0187-0
- Der Letzte Dreh – German version of Twist with Ursula Grutzmacher-Tabori. (1999 Gerhard Pegler Plays)
- It's Now Or Never! (1999 Josef Weinberger Plays) ISBN 0-85676-148-6
- Topless (2000 Comedy Hall Books) ISBN 0-9537601-0-3
- Jean Marlow Audition Speeches for Women – Extract from Topless. (2001 A&C Black) ISBN 0-7136-5276-4
- Fripp (2001 Comedy Hall Books) ISBN 0-9537601-1-1
- Topless – new edition, (2006 Matador Books) ISBN 1-905237-75-8
- Twist (2008 Matador Books) ISBN 978-1-84876-013-4
- Topless in Philadelphia (2009 Matador Books) ISBN 978-1-84876-043-1
- Fripp (2011 Kindle Edition)
- Up Pompeii (2012 Josef Weinberger Plays) ISBN 978-085676-338-0
- The Topless plays (2014 CS Independent Publishing & Kindle Edition) ISBN 978-1-5054-4949-5
- Topless in Sydney (2016 CS Independent Publishing & Kindle Edition) ISBN 978-1-5327-9969-3
- Topless in Philadelphia (2018 CS Independent Publishing & Kindle Edition) ISBN 978-1-7224-7502-4
- Topless in London (2018 CS Independent Publishing & Kindle Edition) ISBN 978-1-7228-8315-7
- Topless in Las Vegas (2018 CS Independent Publishing & Kindle Edition) ISBN 9781719297288
- Twist (2019 Josef Weinberger Plays) ISBN 9780856763755
- Crazy Paving: My Blunders in showbusiness (2025 Beach Café Books) ISBN 979-8-3012-5425-3

== Records ==
- Everyone's A Winner – London (1977 MCA Records)
- Summer of Love and Friday on My Mind – London (1977 MCA Records)
- Animal Games – single. London (1977 MCA Records)
- Punk Rock – Various Artists. (1977 Philips/Phonogram Records Brazil)
- Animal Games – album. London (1978 MCA Records)
- Meet the New Punk Wave – Various Artists. (1978 EMI Records Holland)
- All The Nice Boys And Girls in the World – Riff Regan (1978 MCA Records)
- Japanese Girls – Riff Regan (1978 MCA Records)
- You Call Me Lucky – Riff Regan (1979 MCA Records)
- Spring Sampler – Various Artists (1979 MCA Records)
- The Only One – Riff Regan (1979 MCA Records)
- Hard Hearts Don't Cry – Riff Regan (1981 CBS Epic Records)
- Hottest Woman in Town – single. Berni Torme and The Hard. (1983 CM Records)
- Metal Killers – Various Artists. (1983 Kastle Killer Records)
- London The Punk Rock Collection – London (1997 Captain Oi! Records)
- Get Out of London – London (2010 Official bootleg live CD)
- Reboot – London (2012 Bin Liner Records)
- Milestones – Riff Regan (2015 Beach Café Records)
- The Hell for Leather Mob – London (2020 Beach Café Records)

== Television and radio shows ==
- So It Goes (1977 Granada Television)
- The Weekend Show (1979 ITV Television)
- Superfrank! (1987 Channel 4 Television)
- Wyatt's Watchdogs (1988 BBC Television)
- Laugh? I Nearly Went To Miami! (1992 South Africa Radio)
- Birds of a Feather (1992 Alomo Productions and BBC Television)
- It's Now or Never! (1993 South Africa Radio)
- Topless – (1999 Carlton Television excerpt and report)
- Topless – Live from London (2000 The Amy Lamé Show, BBC Radio London)
- Generation X (2001 BBC Television)
- Facing the Music with David and Carrie Grant (2005 BBC Television)
- Don't Get Done, Get Dom (2006 BBC Television)

== DVD, videos and film ==
- Everyone's A Winner – Director Mike Mansfield (1977 MCA Records)
- Animal Games – So It Goes (1977 Granada Television)
- London Live at the Marquee – (1977 Italy)
- You Call Me Lucky (1979 Westward Television)
- Birds of a Feather (2011 Series 4 DVD on Network)
- Superfrank! (2011 Oh, Please Yourselves – Frankie Howerd at ITV DVD on Network)
