= London (British band) =

British punk band

- L–R: Dave Wight, Riff Regan, Jon Moss, Steve Voice

Background information
- Origin: London, England
- Genres: Punk rock
- Years active: 1976–1978; 2008–present
- Labels: MCA; Beach Café; Captain Oi!; Bin Liner; Pun77k
- Members: Riff Regan; Steve Voice; Hugh O'Donnell; Colin Watterston
- Past members: Rick De'Ath; Jon Moss; Dave Wight
- Website: www.milestredinnick.co.uk/london-the-band-home.html

London are an English four-piece punk band formed in London in 1976, best known for their wild stage act. The original line-up was Riff Regan (vocals), Steve Voice (bass guitar), Jon Moss (drums) and Dave Wight (guitar). They were managed by Simon Napier-Bell and recorded two singles, a four-track EP and an album for MCA Records in 1977. Most of their songs were written by Riff Regan (including the first two singles "Everyone's a Winner" and "Summer of Love") or by Regan and Steve Voice. All their records were produced by Napier-Bell at the IBC Studios in London.

After an absence of more than 30 years the band returned to live performance, and subsequently released the album Reboot in 2012. The 2024 line-up is Riff Regan (vocals), Steve Voice (bass/guitar/vocals), Hugh O'Donnell (guitar/vocals) and Colin Watterston (drums).

== History ==
Henry Padovani auditioned for London in December 1976 and was offered a position in the band, but changed his mind when Stewart Copeland invited him to join The Police instead.

Jon Moss joined the band after being tried as a drummer with The Clash. He later said, "The mix of personalities didn't work; their attitudes were too different to mine."

They toured extensively throughout 1977, first supporting The Stranglers and then as headliners in their own right. Their third release, the single "Animal Games", was featured on the notorious Sex Pistols edition of the British TV rock show So It Goes.

The final gig of the original line-up was at the Marquee Club in Wardour Street on 8 December 1977. The band broke up shortly afterwards. On leaving, Moss joined The Damned and then formed Culture Club with Boy George. Riff Regan released solo records before reverting to his real name of Miles Tredinnick and becoming a comedy writer. He wrote scripts for Frankie Howerd and was a writer on the BBC TV series Birds of a Feather.

Steve Voice formed a new band, The Original Vampires, and Dave Wight, following spells in Metro and Holly and the Italians, reverted to his real name of Colin Wight and became an academic.

MCA Records released the original band's one and only album, Animal Games, in February 1978.

London The Punk Rock Collection, a CD containing all their recorded work, was released on the Captain Oi! label in 1997 and in 2010 the band released an official live bootleg CD Get Out Of London.

Reboot, their first studio album in 34 years, was released on CD and digital formats in February 2012. An LP version on 180-gram heavyweight vinyl was released in March 2018.

The Hell for Leather Mob, a 15 song rocktale studio album was released on CD and digital formats by Beach Café Records in July 2020.

== Discography ==
- "Everyone's a Winner" b/w "Handcuffed" (1977 MCA Records)
- "Summer of Love", "No Time", "Friday on my Mind", "Siouxsie Sue" (7 inch & 12 inch EP, 1977 MCA Records)
- Punk Rock – Various Artists (1977 Philips/Phonogram Records Brazil)
- "Animal Games" b/w "Us Kids Cold" (1977 MCA Records)
- Animal Games (1978 MCA Records)
- Meet the New Punk Wave – Various Artists (1978 EMI Records Holland)
- London The Punk Rock Collection (1997 CD Captain Oi! Records)
- Get Out Of London (Official bootleg live CD 2010 Pun77K Records)
- Reboot (2012 Bin Liner Records)
- The Hell for Leather Mob (2020 Beach Café Records)

== Videography ==
- Everyone's a Winner – Director Mike Mansfield (1977 MCA Records)
- Animal Games – So It Goes. (1977 Granada Television)
- London Live at the Marquee – (1977 Italy)
- A Collection of 'London' Videos – (1977–2011)
