= It's Now or Never =

It's Now or Never may refer to:

- "It's Now or Never" (song), a song by Elvis Presley, based on the aria "'O Sole Mio"
- It's Now or Never (game show), a UK gameshow which aired for one episode in 2006
- It's Now or Never!, a stage comedy by Miles Tredinnick
- It's Now or Never (album), by the band Make Me Famous
- It's Now or Never (film), a 2015 Spanish romantic comedy movie (original title: Ahora o Nunca)

== See also ==
- Now or Never (disambiguation)
