= Now or Never =

Now or Never may refer to:

== Film and television ==
- Now or Never (1921 film), a silent film starring Harold Lloyd
- Now or Never (1935 film)
- Now or Never (1979 film), a film featuring Tally Brown
- Now or Never (1998 film), a film by Jean Pierre Lefebvre
- Now or Never (2003 film), a comedy-drama film by Lucio Pellegrini
- "Now or Never" (Grey's Anatomy), an episode of Grey's Anatomy
- Now or Never is a 7-week, 29-episode package of Degrassi
- Now or Never, a British morning show in the ITV Day programming block

== Music ==
=== Albums ===
- Now or Never (Bananarama EP) (2012)
- Now or Never (Blazin' Squad album) (2003)
- Now or Never (Brett Kissel album) (2020)
- Now or Never (Nick Carter album) (2002)
- Now or Never (CNBLUE EP) (2009)
- Now or Never (Lead album) (2003)
- Now or Never (Tank album) (2010)
- Now or Never (Tela album) (1998)
- Now or Never, a 2015 mix-tape by Mumzy Stranger
- Now or Never, a 1981 album by John Schneider

=== Songs ===
- "Now or Never" (Billie Holiday song) (1949)
- "Now or Never" (Yoko Ono song) (1972)
- "Now or Never" (Mark Medlock song) (2007)
- "Now or Never" (High School Musical song) (2008)
- "Now or Never" (Jodie Connor song) (2011)
- "Now or Never" (Outasight song) (2012)
- "Now or Never" (Halsey song) (2017)
- "Now or Never" (Pitbull song) (2024)
- "Now or Never", a 2009 song by CNBLUE
- "Now or Never", a 2010 song by Confide from Recover
- "Now or Never", a 2001 song by Dope from Life
- "Now or Never", a 2007 song by Everlife from Everlife
- "Now or Never", a 2023 song by Frozen Crown from Call of the North
- "Now or Never", a 1998 song by Godsmack from Godsmack
- "Now or Never", a 1984 song by Grim Reaper from See You in Hell
- "Now or Never", a 2006 song by Josh Groban from Awake
- "Now or Never", a 2012 song by Kendrick Lamar featuring vocals by Blige from Good Kid, M.A.A.D City
- "Now or Never", a 2019 song by Lacuna Coil from Black Anima
- "Now or Never", a 2007 song by Madina Lake from From Them, Through Us, to You
- "Now or Never", a 2017 song by Monsta X from The Code
- "Now or Never", a 2010 song by M. M. Keeravani, Benny Dayal, Geetha Madhuri, Deepu from the film Vedam
- "Now or Never", a 2001 song by Primal Fear from Nuclear Fire
- "Now or Never", a 2018 song by SF9
- "Now or Never", a 2009 song by Stream of Passion from The Flame Within
- "Now or Never", a 2003 song by Three Days Grace from the album Three Days Grace
- "Now or Never", a 2018 song by Tremonti from A Dying Machine
- "Now or Never", a 2013 song by Tritonal featuring vocals by Phoebe Ryan
- "Now or Never", a 2000 song by Zebrahead from Playmate of the Year
- "Now or Never!", a song from the Splatoon franchise composed by Toru Minegishi that has been covered by many fictional artists
- "Now or Never", a 2025 song by Zerobaseone from Prezent
- "Now or Never", a 2025 song by TKANDZ

== Other uses ==
- "Now or Never; Are We to Live or Perish Forever?" or the Pakistan Declaration, a pamphlet by Choudhary Rahmat Ali
- "Now or Never" (radio show), a Canadian radio documentary series broadcast on CBC Radio One

== See also ==
- It's Now or Never (disambiguation)
