= Twist (stage play) =

Play by Miles Tredinnick

- First Edition UK cover
- Author: Miles Tredinnick
- Language: English
- Genre: stage play
- Publisher: Matador Books
- Publication date: 2008
- Publication place: United Kingdom
- Media type: Print (paperback)
- Pages: 142p.
- ISBN: 978-1-84876-013-4
- OCLC: 234304058
- Dewey Decimal: 822.914 22
- LC Class: PR6070.R354 T95 2008

Twist is a comedy stage thriller by Miles Tredinnick. Originally written in 1990, it was first produced in 1995 at the Pentameters Theatre in London under the title Getting Away with Murder. Twist has a cast of three men and three women.

The play is a parody of the traditional theatrical thriller, in which nobody is what they seem and nothing is what it should be. David Woods is an accountant who sees a way of making a fortune by writing a kiss-and-tell biography about his famous actress wife Sarah. He then realises that his book will do even better if she is murdered first.

A German version entitled Der Letzte Dreh, translated by Ursula Grutzmacher-Tabori, is available and, in 2008, Matador Books published a UK acting edition. Twist was also published as a Kindle Edition in 2011. The play had its US debut in Taunton, Massachusetts in 2010.

== Characters ==
- David Woods - an accountant.
- Sarah Seeton - David's wife.
- Mrs Beck - caretaker.
- Robert Woods - David's brother.
- Hannah Van Lee - A South African from Umzimvubu.
- Inspector Root - police officer.
