= So It Goes (TV series) =

British television music series (1976–1977)

Wilson presenting So It Goes in 1976

So It Goes is a British television music show presented by Tony Wilson on Granada Television between 1976 and 1977. It is most famous for showcasing the then burgeoning punk rock movement. It was named partially in reference to Kurt Vonnegut's 1969 novel Slaughterhouse-Five.

The show's first series, produced by Chris Pye, gave the Sex Pistols their first ever television appearance, and featured performances by Patti Smith. It also included occasional non-punk guests such as journalist Clive James and comedian Peter Cook (hosting a 'Riff of the Month' competition). The second series, produced by Geoff Moore, featured performances by the Jam, the Clash, Buzzcocks, The Stranglers, and Siouxsie and the Banshees. An expletive-strewn appearance by Iggy Pop proved too much for Granada bosses, leading to the cancellation of a third series.

== Episode guide ==
The first series consisted of nine editions that ran from 3 July to 21 August 1976. This was followed over a year later by the second series, consisting of ten editions running from 9 October to 11 December 1977. 1 The series was only ever shown in three ITV regions including Granada (the other 2 regions were ATV and LWT).

== Series 1 ==
=== Show 1 ===
- Broadcast 3 July 1976
- Presented by Tony Wilson, featuring Clive James
- Director: Peter Walker
- Producer: Chris Pye

The 'Opportunity Rocks' spot featured the Jeff Raven Band, seen performing "I Just Can't Get Next To You" live in concert. Traditional Irish music group The Chieftains were live in the studio performing "Mná na hÉireann" and "Traditional Song". Peter Blake and his wife, Jann Howarth, discussed the design of the Beatles' Sgt. Pepper's Lonely Hearts Club Band album, as well as how the original idea was conceived and produced.

In a spoof "Where Are They Now?" feature, So It Goes visited Stephen Hawes, a university lecturer in French, to find out he is still a university lecturer in French, and Tom Waits was live in the studio performing 'Better Off Without A Wife'. After a spoof ad break (featuring old black and white adverts for "Top Brass" shampoo and "All" washing powder), Clive James impersonated Henry Kissinger in Brain Damage.

The "As Time Goes By" feature looked back at Sister Rosetta Tharpe performing 'I Gotta Blues but I Too Damn Mean to Cry' at Chorlton-cum-Hardy railway station in 1964 (assumed to be originally from Granada Television's Blues and Gospel Train special). The album of the week in 'Pressed to Kill' was from the Mike Westbrook Orchestra. Closing the show were The Sutherland Bros and Quiver live in the studio performing 'When the Train Comes'.

=== Show 2 ===
- Broadcast 10 July 1976
- Presented by Tony Wilson, featuring Clive James
- Director: Peter Walker
- Producer: Chris Pye

Live in the studio, Kevin Ayers performed 'Ballad of Mr Snake'. The featured album in 'Pressed to Kill' was 'Rock and Roll Music' by The Beatles. Clive James talked about the 'Brain Damage' caused by Rod Stewart. 'Opportunity Rocks' for Bettina Jonic who was live in the studio performing Bob Dylan's 'Like a Rolling Stone'. Tony Wilson interviewed Roger Dean to find out about his inspiration for creating album cover designs. In 'As Time Goes By' there was a 1967 performance of 'On a Carousel' by The Hollies (taken from 'The World Tomorrow: Sound or Music?'). Back in the studio, 'Frankie Miller's Full House' closed the show performing the 'Doodle Song'.

=== Show 3 ===
- Broadcast 17 July 1976
- Presented by Tony Wilson, featuring Clive James
- Director: Peter Walker
- Producer: Chris Pye

The Noel Redding Band were live in the studio performing 'Back on the Road Again'. The design feature was on denim art and Clive James got 'Brain Damage' from the talent in the BBC light entertainment department, Cilla Black and Lulu. Rogue were featured in 'Opportunity Rocks'. In the studio, The London Saxophone Quartet performed the 'Agincourt Song'. Marianne Faithfull sang 'Yesterday' in 'As Time Goes By' (taken from The Music of Lennon and McCartney). The programme's favourite French lecturer was caught outside Dingwalls, and Eddie and the Hot Rods closed the show with a live studio performance of 'Woolly Bully'

=== Show 4 ===
- Broadcast 24 July 1976
- Presented by Tony Wilson, featuring Clive James
- Director: Peter Walker
- Producer: Chris Pye

Mr Pugh’s Velvet Glove Show with Ted Milton appeared in the studio. Also featured were Mott the Hoople, who performed 'Shouting and Pointing'. Lou Reed's 'Coney Island Baby' album was 'Pressed to Kill', and Tony Wilson interviewed the wrong Mark Phillips. Stephan Micus was live in the studio performing music he had composed himself on the Afghan rubabs. Tony Wilson went to CBS Records in London to see the design department, and 'As Time Goes By' featured Peter Sellers performing 'A Hard Day's Night' (taken from The Music of Lennon and McCartney). In 'Brain Damage', Clive James discussed Sarah Miles and Kris Kristofferson, and 'The Sailor Who Fell from Grace with the Sea'. Closing the show, Graham Parker and The Rumour were in the studio to perform 'Soul Shoes'.

=== Show 5 ===
- Broadcast 31 July 1976
- Presented by Tony Wilson, featuring Clive James
- Director: Peter Walker
- Producer: Chris Pye

Tony Wilson went on location to ask Patti Smith why she re-makes old classics. Snooky Pryor performed 'What Have I Got to Do' in the studio, backed by the Victor Brox Blues Train. 'Pressed to Kill' looked at 'Shakti' by John McLaughlin. In 'Brain Damage', Clive James discussed Page 3 girls, and singer/songwriter Ross Macfarlane (winner of that year's Melody Maker Rock/Folk Competition) was the star of 'Opportunity Rocks'. Macfarlane performed live in the studio, singing the self-penned song, 'Reflections'. 'As Time Goes By' featured The Doors (taken from 'The Doors Are Open'). Steve Hawes, So It Goes' favourite French lecturer was in the studio. The John Miles Band were in the studio to perform 'House on the Hill', and Patti Smith explained exactly why she plays rock music.

=== Show 6 ===
- Broadcast 7 August 1976
- Presented by Tony Wilson, featuring Clive James
- Director: Peter Walker
- Producer: Chris Pye

Introduction by Adam West (Batman). Be-Bop Deluxe were live in the studio performing 'Sister Seagull'. Tony Wilson discussed protest songs and played Víctor Jara's 1974 protest song about the Chilean dissenters imprisoned in a football ground in Santiago. 'As Time Goes By' featured the Animals performing 'Twist and Shout' (taken from studio footage before the recording of Whole Lotta Shakin' in 1964). Alan Stivell was in the studio performing 'Jenovefa'. In the design feature, Tony Wilson went to the Hipgnosis studio in Soho to discuss how they create album covers. Clive James talked about the increasing TV coverage of 'lost' tribes in 'Brain Damage'. Closing the show, Soft Machine were in the studio, performing 'The Tale of Taliesin'.

=== Show 7 ===
- Broadcast 14 August 1976
- Presented by Tony Wilson, featuring Clive James
- Director: Peter Walker
- Producer: Chris Pye

Eddie "Guitar" Burns was live in the studio performing "Bottle Up and Go". Clive James appeared throughout the show as Demis Roussos. Tony Wilson looked at AC/DC in the Opportunity Rocks spot – there was a clip of the band performing "Jailbreak" – and looked at Andy Pratt's latest album, Resolution. A Band Called O were in the studio singing "Don'tcha Wanna", and Gene Vincent sang "Be-Bop-A-Lula" in the feature As Time Goes By (taken from Whole Lotta Shakin, 1964). Also in the studio were Kate & Anna McGarrigle, who performed two songs from their eponymous album; "Complainte Pour Ste-Catherine" and "Talk To Me of Mendocino". Patti Smith got the final word as So It Goes went on location to hear her plans for a rock opera.

=== Show 8 ===
- Broadcast 21 August 1976
- Presented by Tony Wilson, featuring Clive James
- Director: Peter Walker
- Producer: Chris Pye

Tony Wilson and Clive James presented the show: live studio performances by Matumbi performing 'A Woman Like You' and Alberto y Lost Trios Paranoias performing "Old Trust" were featured. A clip of Simon & Garfunkel was shown and Tony Wilson went behind the scenes of Kiss's first British concert (at the Free Trade Hall on 13 May 1976). A botched interview with Zero, the Special Effects Co-ordinator for Kiss, was shown, as was an interview with the band themselves (intercut with concert footage).

=== Show 9 ===
- Broadcast 28 August 1976
- Presented by Tony Wilson, featuring Clive James
- Director: Peter Walker
- Producer: Chris Pye

Featured live studio performances by Gentlemen singing 'My Ego's Killing Me' and the Bowles Brothers Band performing 'Charlie's Nuts'. Peter Cook introduced the 'Riff of the Month' competition. Albums of the Week included the Ramones' debut album and Southside Johnny. In 'Brain Damage', Clive James attacked the music reviews of Charles Shaar Murray. There was a nostalgic look back at Jerry Lee Lewis (taken from 'Whole Lotta Shakin' in 1964) in the 'As Time Goes By' section. Back in the studio, Clive James interviewed Peter Cook (possessed by his alter-ego 'Clive'). The last studio band, the Sex Pistols, performed 'Anarchy in the U.K.'. The show closed with location footage of the Dr. Hook band getting into a taxi.

Three months after this episode was broadcast, Clive James wrote about his appearance on it in The Observer, and in particular expressed disapproval of the Sex Pistols, referring to Johnny Rotten as "a foul-mouthed ball of acne calling himself something like Kenny Frightful".

== Series 2 ==
=== Show 1 ===
- Broadcast 9 October 1977
- Presented by Tony Wilson
- Studio Director: Eric Harrison
- Producer: Geoff Moore

A recorded performance of Van Morrison singing 'Venice USA'. There is an archive clip of The Rubinoos singing Tommy James & the Shondells' classic I Think We're Alone Now (source unknown). John Cooper Clarke is interviewed in the studio by Tony, featuring clips of John reading poetry in clubs around Manchester. There is archive clip of a Paul McCartney interview (source unknown), following by a recorded performance of Buzzcocks singing 'What Do I Get?' at The Electric Circus, Manchester. There is a short teaser clip of Sad Café performing 'Love will survive' at Rafters and we're back to Maunkberry's to hear Van Morrison performing 'Kansas City'. During the end credits, Elvis Costello performs 'Mystery Dance' at Eric's, Liverpool.

=== Show 2 ===
- Broadcast 16 October 1977
- Presented by Tony Wilson
- Japanese Voice-Over: Misako Koba
- Studio Director: Eric Harrison
- Producer: Geoff Moore

We see clips of Elvis Costello performing 'Alison' (short excerpt from the Granada Reports "What's On" appearance 21 July 1977) and at Eric's singing '(I Don't Want To Go To) Chelsea'. Ron Haffkine from Dr Hook gives his opinion on 'How to Cope with Superstars'. Appearing live in the studio, John Otway and Wild Willy Barrett perform 'Beware of The Flowers'. Recommended album of the week is a band from Japan, so we see a clip of The Girls singing a cover of 'Honky Tonk Woman'. We're back to Eric's to see Elvis Costello perform "Watching the Detectives" and then on to the Electric Circus to see Penetration perform 'Don't Dictate': then back to Eric's again for one last song, 'Lip Service', sung by Elvis Costello.

=== Show 3 ===
- Broadcast 23 October 1977
- Presented by Tony Wilson
- Studio Director: Eric Harrison
- Producer: Geoff Moore

Alberto y Lost Trios Paranoias singing 'Teenage Paradise' at Rafters, Manchester. There is a short interview on VT with Ian Dury followed by 'Sex & Drugs & Rock & Roll' (nature VT to accompany the song featuring camels). There's comedy from a couple of 'roadies' –- Arthur Kelly and Gorden Kaye, followed by clips from an Alberto y Lost Trios Paranoias' rock opera as they perform 'Snuffin' in a Babylon' and Gobbin' on Life. We go to Liverpool's Eric's club to see Nick Lowe performing 'Endless Sleep' and 'Shake and Pop'. The show ends back at Rafters with Alberto y Lost Trios Paranoias performing 'Death of Rock and Roll'.

=== Show 4 ===
- Broadcast 30 October 1977
- Presented by Tony Wilson
- Studio Director: Eric Harrison
- Producer: Geoff Moore

Cherry Vanilla advises us on 'How to Give a Good Head of Hair to Your Boyfriend'. Roy Hill performs 'George's Bar' live in the studio. Tony goes out on location to interview Iggy Pop, and we get to see a performance of 'The Passenger' at the Apollo Theatre, Manchester. We see the Movies performing in Liverpool singing 'Big Boys Band'. The recommended album of the week is from Talking Heads and we hear a short excerpt of 'Psycho Killer' (visual is a nature VT of tribal men). As the programme ends Iggy Pop sings 'Lust for Life' at the Apollo Theatre, Manchester (end credits roll over performance).

=== Show 5 ===
- Broadcast 6 November 1977
- Presented by Tony Wilson
- Studio Director: Eric Harrison
- Film Director: Peter Carr
- Producer: Geoff Moore

So It Goes goes out on location to watch the Stranglers perform 'Something Better Change' at the Hope 'n' Anchor, London; this is followed by a guide to the world of promotion and pop. Tony interviews Johnny Thunders and the Heartbreakers and a clip of a recent concert by the Tom Robinson Band, performing 'Martin' is shown. There is an archive clip of Free performing 'Alright Now' in tribute to guitarist Paul Kossoff who had recently died of a drugs overdose. The recommended single is Greg Kihn's version of Bruce Springsteen's song 'For You', then back on location, the Tom Robinson Band performs "Glad to Be Gay" at Middleton Civic Hall.

=== Show 6 ===
- Broadcast 13 November 1977
- Presented by Tony Wilson
- Studio Director: Eric Harrison
- Film Director: Peter Carr
- Producer: Geoff Moore
- Featuring in the Studio: Pete Batley

John Dowie is live in the studio to perform 'Mew Wave'. Sad Café are filmed performing 'Love Will Survive' at Rafters, and then back in the studio John Dowie sings 'British Tourist'. Mink DeVille are at Middleton Civic Hall, performing 'Little Girl' and 'Venus of Avenue D'. So It Goes gives a Play- in-a-day Guide to how to interview a famous rock star, using William Rees-Mogg's interview of Mick Jagger as an example of how not to do it. Recommended album of the week is MX-80 Sound's 'Hard Attack', and there is a short clip of "Facts-Facts". Mink DeVille play out the show with 'Just You and Me' (credits start rolling before the track finishes).

=== Show 7 ===
- Broadcast 20 November 1977
- Presented by Tony Wilson
- Studio Director: Eric Harrison
- Film Directors: Peter Carr & Colin Richards
- Producer: Geoff Moore

Elvis Costello performs 'No Dancing' at Eric's in Liverpool. Poly Styrene from X-Ray Spex is in the studio for an interview with Tony. From a recent concert at the Electric Circus, Manchester, The Jam perform 'In the City', and 'All Around The World'. Muddy Waters performs 'Blues Had a Baby' at the New Victoria Theatre in London. The Play-in-a-Day Guide tells how to make promos for TV, showing promo material of the Troggs and Reg Presley singing 'Lazy Weekend'. Recommended album of the week is 'Never Mind The Bollocks' by the Sex Pistols, and it's back to the Jam at the Electric Circus for 'Slow Down', and 'Taking My Love' (credits start rolling before the end of this song).

=== Show 8 ===
- Broadcast 27 November 1977
- Presented by Tony Wilson
- Studio Director: Malcolm Clarke
- Producer: Geoff Moore

The Pirates perform 'I Can Tell' at the Elizabethan Ballroom, Belle Vue in Manchester. The So It Goes guide to how to spot good management comes next, followed by XTC performing 'Neon Shuffle' at Middleton Civic Hall. We look back at the Sex Pistols performing 'Anarchy in the UK' in an earlier episode of So It Goes. CP Lee and Albie Donally are live in the studio performing 'Strawberry Fields Forever' as only they know how. Siouxsie and the Banshees perform 'Make up to break up' at the Elizabethan Ballroom, Belle Vue, Manchester, while a young Mick Hucknall watches from the audience. The recommended album of the week is from the Fall and we hear Animal Games by London (played over a nature VT of zoo animals). XTC end the show singing 'All Along the Watchtower' performed at Middleton Civic Hall. (credits start to roll before the end of the song).

=== Show 9 ===
- Broadcast 4 December 1977
- Presented by Tony Wilson, with help from Matthew Corbett and his sidekicks Sooty and Sweep
- Studio Director: Malcolm Clarke
- Film Director: Peter Carr
- Producer: Geoff Moore

Dave Edmunds is at Eric's in Liverpool and performs 'I Knew the Bride'. Due to the departure of Howard Devoto, Tony shows a brief clip of Buzzcocks performing 'Orgasm Addict' (Howard left to form Magazine, who are shown performing 'Motorcade' at the Elizabethan Ballroom, Belle Vue, Manchester). Tony looks at 'I Left a Woman Waiting' from the Cohen and Spector album 'Death of a Ladies' Man'. Dave Edmunds performs "I Hear You Knocking" and there is a clip of John Cooper Clarke performing 'Kung-Fu International' at the Elizabethan Ballroom, Belle Vue, Manchester. Closing the show, Magazine perform 'Shot by Both Sides'.

=== Show 10 ===
- Broadcast 11 December 1977
- Presented by Tony Wilson
- Studio Director: Nicholas Ferguson
- Producer: Geoff Moore

We see a clip of the now infamous 'Jon the Postman' performing at the Electric Circus, Manchester. Album of the week is Jonathan Richman Live, and we listen to a little of 'I'm a Little Dinosaur' (audio only over stock footage). The founder of Beserkley Records Matthew Kaufman gives his 'Play-in-a-day' guide to 'What is Beserkley?' Ian Dury is live in studio for a recital of the Bus Driver's Prayer in tribute to Charlie Mingus. Steel Pulse perform 'Makka Spliff (The Colly Man)' and 'Ku Klux Klan' at the Elizabethan Ballroom, Belle Vue, Manchester and the Clash perform 'Capital Radio' at the same venue. After a few quick questions, Ian Dury recites the 'Bus Driver's Prayer' and the Clash play out, performing ‘Janie Jones’ at the Elizabethan Ballroom once more (end credits roll before the end of the performance).

== 24 Hour Party People ==
In the movie 24 Hour Party People, the set of So It Goes was recreated, with Steve Coogan playing the part of Tony Wilson. Some Wilson references in the film are not historically accurate however: for example, Coogan as Wilson introduces The Sex Pistols singing "Anarchy in the UK" by saying it is "two minutes of the most important music since Elvis walked into the Sun Studios". Wilson's actual introduction to them on the show was that they were "one of the most reviewed and most reviled rock phenomenon [sic] of recent weeks".
