= Tiller Girls =

Dance troupe

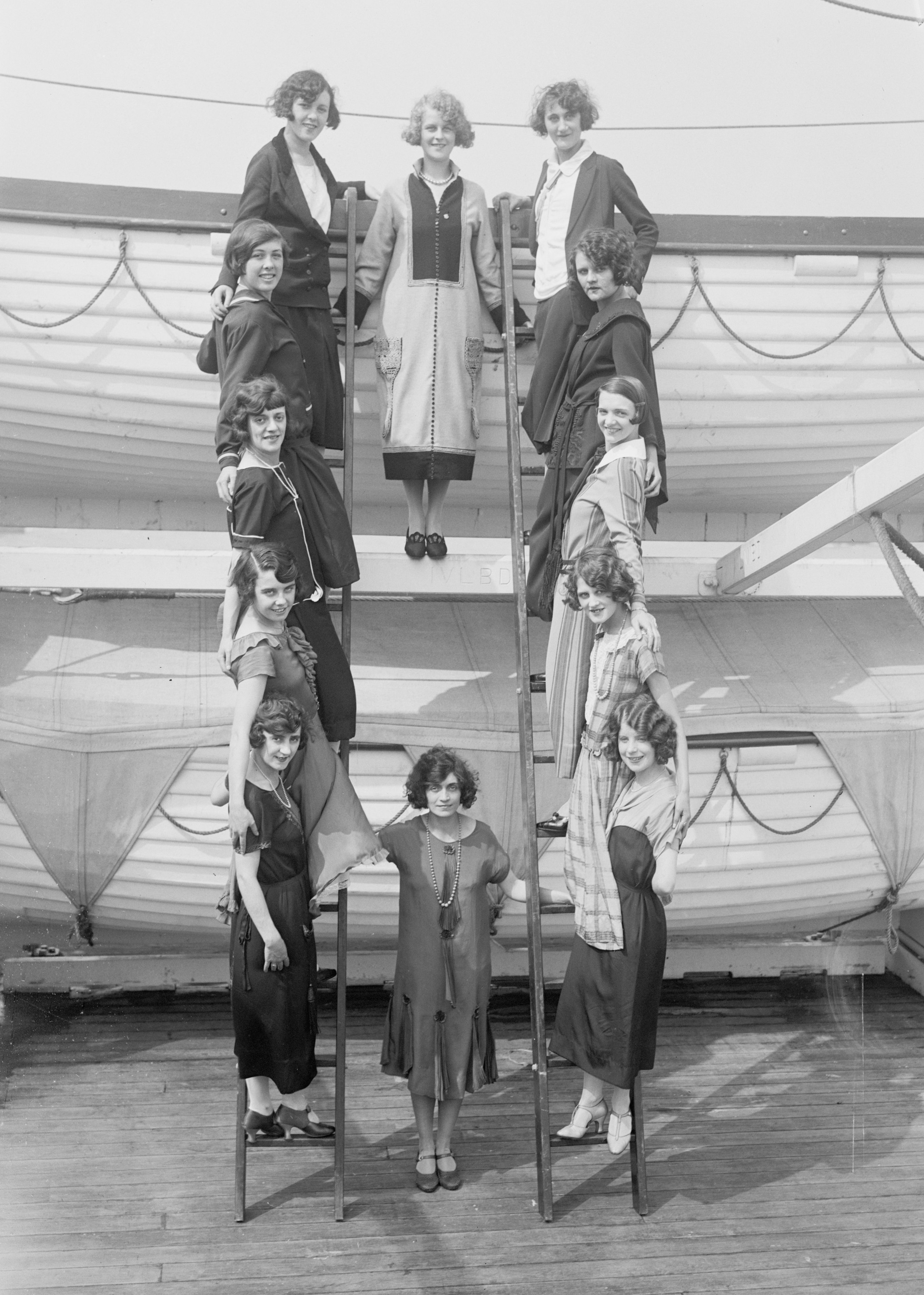
Tiller Girls posing on a ship, c. mid-late 1920s

The Tiller Girls were among the most popular dance troupes of the 1890s, first formed by John Tiller in Manchester, England, in 1889. In theatre Tiller had noticed the overall effect of a chorus of dancers was often spoiled by lack of discipline. Tiller found that by linking arms the dancers could dance as one; he is credited with inventing precision dance. Possibly most famous for their high-kicking routines, the Tiller Girls were highly trained and precise.

John Tiller's first dancers performed as 'Les Jolies Petites'. He originally formed the group for the pantomime 'Robinson Crusoe', subtitled 'The Good Friday That Came on a Saturday', in 1890 at the Prince of Wales Theatre, Liverpool. From this were founded the Tiller School of Dancing and the Tiller Girl troupes. The number of troupes grew to dozens, and their fame spread around the world.

The troupes were all slightly different, but within each troupe the girls were matched very precisely by height and weight. Individuality within the troupes was discouraged in favour of a strong group ethic. The Tillers performed as resident dancers at the Folies Bergère in Paris, the London Palladium, the Palace Theatres in Manchester and in London (as the Palace Girls or Sunshine Girls), the Blackpool Winter Gardens, on New York's Broadway, where Tiller had a dance school, and at hundreds of other theatres throughout Europe and the United States. One Tiller group, the Pony Ballet, earned success in the U.S. in musical comedy and vaudeville, performing from 1899 to 1914. In a 1911 newspaper interview, Beatrice Liddell, the leader of the Pony Ballet, described the Tiller school of the late 1890s as having a boarding school facility in Limehouse, Manchester, where girls aged five to ten were taught academic subjects as well as dance, to gauge their aptitude for dancing. Promising students graduated to Tiller's Covent Garden, London, facility.

== Tiller routines and line-ups ==
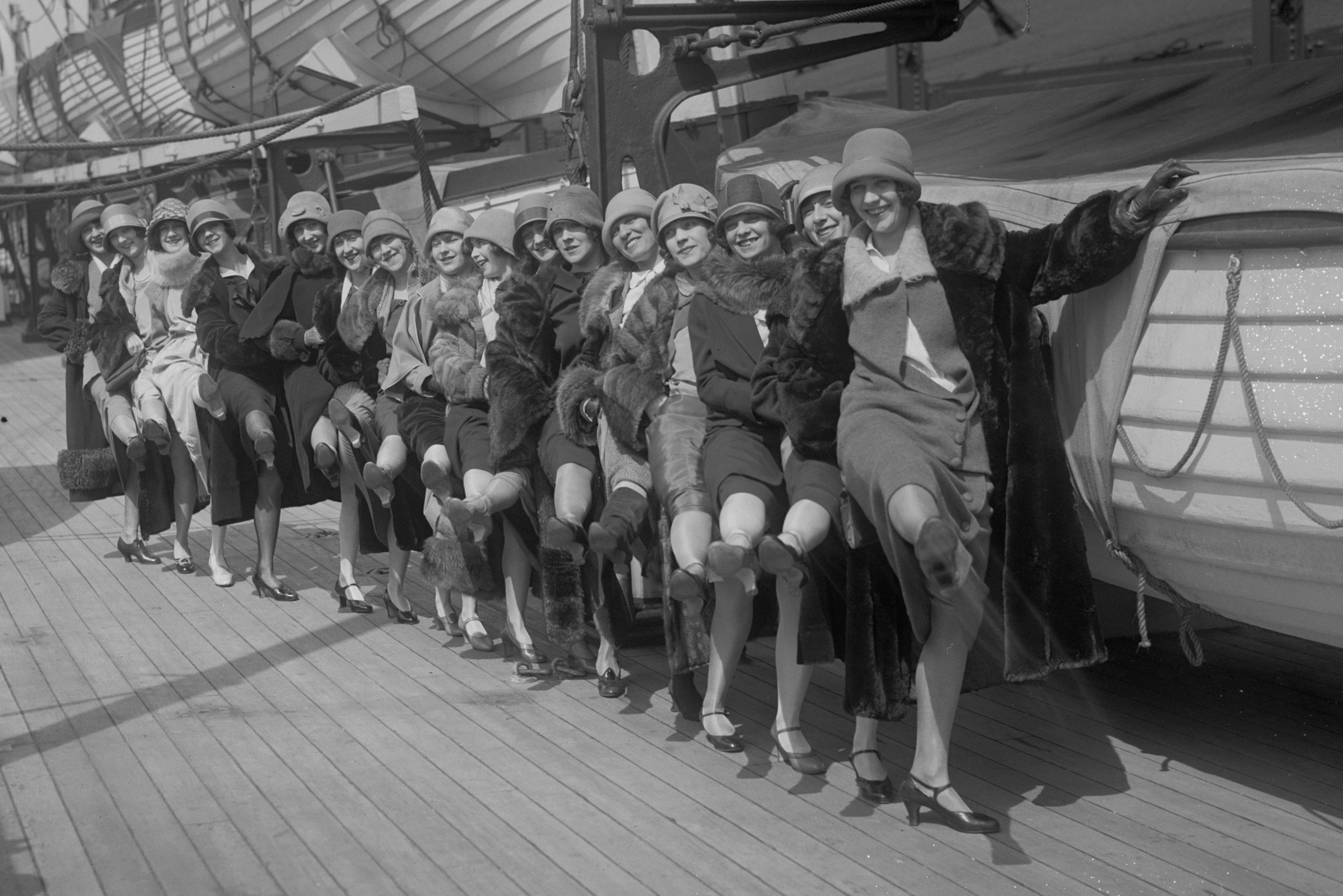
The Tiller Girls in an impromptu dance line

The Tiller Girls performed a 'Tap and Kick' routine, which was originally called 'Fancy-Dancing' but today is known as 'Precision Dancing'. The routines may consist of straight lines or geometric figures.

Siegfried Kracauer stated in 1923, "These 76 energetic women dance about in geometric shapes: the regularity of their patterns is cheered by the masses, themselves arranged by the stands in tier upon ordered tier."

In certain shows a Tiller line-up could be as many as 32 girls who were selected for uniform height and weight. In 1923 the stage play Nifties of 1923 featured twelve Tiller Girls.

== After John Tiller ==
After John Tiller's death in 1925, the Tiller schools in the U.K. were kept alive first by his wife Jennie Tiller, then by some of the head girls. The U.S. Tiller school in New York City was continued under the leadership of Mary Read until 1935. By the 1940s the John Tiller Schools of Dancing were managed by its 3 directors, Mr John Smith, Miss Doris Alloway and Miss Barbara Aitken (also choreographer and a former Tiller Girl). During the 1940s the Tiller Girls were popular, appearing in summer seasons, pantomimes, variety tours, London West End shows, and cabaret.

== 1950s heyday ==
During the 1950s, as travel became easier after World War II, Tiller Troupes began to work abroad again. The Tiller Girls' popularity continued to increase. They were invited to make several appearances at the Royal Variety Performance, notably in 1953 at the London Coliseum, when there were 40 girls in the line-up. As far as is known, neither before or since has there been a longer line of girls performing a kicking routine (the Rockettes have 36).

On Sept 24th 1955 a Tiller Troupe appeared in the first Saturday night variety show transmitted on the new ITV channel, which had been launched 2 days earlier. During the remainder of the 1950s and during the 1960s the Tiller Girls established themselves as the premier dance troupe on British commercial television, being associated particularly with the iconic Sunday Night at the London Palladium.

During the 1970s, management of the troupes was taken over by the impresario Robert Luff and also around that time dance troupes with different styles were emerging. For the first time since their inception the popularity of Tillers went into decline until the formation of the Sixties Tiller Girls.

== The 60s Tiller Girls ==
Towards the end of 1988 a former Tiller Girl, Sandy Jones, received a surprise call from a friend, George May, who was working on a production named Joy to the World, to be staged at the Albert Hall in London. He wanted the Tiller Girls to take part in "The Twelve Days of Christmas" song as the "nine ladies dancing." Sandy made eight phone calls to original Tiller Girls from the 50s and 60s, and all eight immediately agreed, with her making the nine needed. The ladies truly enjoyed the experience, made especially poignant as none expected to be Tiller Girls again after so many years. Then, in later 1988, there was a news bulletin on the actor Terry-Thomas who was suffering with Parkinson's. Jack Douglas, the Carry On comedian, was putting on a charity show at the Drury Lane Theatre to aid both Terry and Parkinson's UK, a research and support charity.

Bruce Vincent, husband of June Vincent (née Labbett), herself a former Tiller girl from 1958 to 1969, phoned Jack Douglas and asked if he would like a troupe of Tiller Girls in the show. From there on in, a busy four months started to get a full troupe of sixteen girls together (all bona fide former Tiller Girls), together with full costumes, music and rehearsals. Wendy Clarke, a former Head Girl, took on responsibility for the choreography. When the troupe of sixteen girls performed on the stage that night the response from the audience was electric and The 60s Tiller Girls were quite literally reborn. This original troupe of ladies, ranging in age from their early 40s to late 50s, carried on for more than twenty years, performing in over 180 shows under Bruce Vincent's stewardship.

The re-formed troupe were fortunate enough to appear in many different shows, mainly for charity, ranging from appearances in Sevenoaks School to performing in Buckingham Palace, and from Westcliff-on-Sea to the London Palladium. The shows at the Palladium were always the ladies' favourite shows as they considered the Palladium their "spiritual" home. To this day, some of the original 1960s Tiller Girls do backstage tours at the London Palladium in full costume, as arranged by the Palladium's box office. They performed at many prestigious charitable events all over the UK, including 40 Glorious Years, in honour of The Queen, and were semi-adopted by Lily Savage, aka Paul O'Grady, for his shows and videos in the 1990s.

The 1960s Tiller Girls formally announced their retirement, and their final show, in April 2011, was a cabaret in aid of Vera Lynn's Children's Charity. The women were then in their late 60s and early 70s, a rare achievement for any dancer, and the joy and pride of bearing the Tiller Girl name was thus passed on into its third century, with the baton being passed to the relaunched Tiller Girls.

== Relaunch ==
World Dance Management relaunched the Tiller Girls on 16 May 2012, having been awarded worldwide rights and an exclusive trademark licence agreement to Bernard Tiller, great grandson of John Tiller, founder of the original troupe. The Tiller Girls performed in a Christmas pantomime show at the London Palladium in December, 2021.

== The Radio City Rockettes connection ==
The Radio City Music Hall Rockettes, an American dance troupe, follow and keep alive the Tiller Girls' tradition of high-kicking precision dancing. Russell Markert, founder of The Rockettes, reminisced: "I had seen the Tiller girls in the Ziegfeld Follies of 1922. If I ever got a chance to get a group of American girls who would be taller and have longer legs and could do really complicated tap routines and eye-high kicks, they'd knock your socks off!" The Rockettes first came to life in 1925 as the "Missouri Rockets" and made their show business debut in St. Louis, the realisation of a long-time dream of their creator, Russell Markert.

Some of the Tiller Girls and American girls who trained with Mary Read also danced in the Rockettes. Lily Smart, who trained with the Tiller School of Dance in Manchester and was with the 1922 troupe in the Ziegfeld Follies, settled in America and joined the Rockettes after leaving the Tiller Girls, performing with them for many years. She was then involved with the training of new dancers. Lily was in constant contact with Bernard Tiller until her death in 2010, aged 106. Lily explained how Russell Markert added his own style to the Precision Dance routines; this found its way back to the Tiller girls in the United Kingdom.

Girls who had visited the United States during the late 1930s and 1940s danced for the troops and liked the American style of dancing and the costumes with headdresses that they saw. American films also featured showgirls and had a big impact on the British audience. From the late 1940s through the 1970s the Tiller girls adopted a lot of American showgirl styles that could trace their roots back to the Folies Bergère in the late 1890s.

== Former Tiller Girls ==
- Betty Boothroyd, Speaker of the House of Commons (1992–2000)
- Aimée Campton, Anglo-French actress
- Gretchen Franklin, EastEnders actress
- Gloria Paul, actress/dancer (Darling Lili, The Intelligence Men)
- Sunny Rogers, pianist who accompanied the comedian Frankie Howerd
- Diana Vreeland, former editor-in-chief of Vogue
