= John Tiller =

English choreographer

- Born: John Thomas Ibbotson Tiller; 13 June 1854; Blackburn, Lancashire, England
- Died: 22 October 1925 (aged 71); New York, New York, U.S.
- Occupation: Musical theater director
- Years active: 1885-1925
- Known for: Tiller Girls

John Thomas Ibbotson Tiller (13 June 1854 – 22 October 1925) was a musical theatre director who was credited with inventing precision dance and was the originator of the 'Tiller Girls'.

== Biography ==
John Tiller always had a keen interest in music. At ten years old he became a choirboy, and a choirmaster at fourteen. He took music lessons with a tutor named Dr Hiles, who later became Professor of Harmony and composition at the Royal Northern College of Music.

One of John's uncles, John George Tiller, was the wealthy owner of a successful cotton agency (one of the largest in Manchester). John wanted the same lifestyle. John's uncle took him into the family business and treated him like a son. During the day John worked in the cotton trade and after work he devoted himself to music and acting. He soon progressed to management in the cotton industry.

At 19 one of his girlfriends, Mary Elizabeth Carr, told him she was pregnant. On Christmas Eve 1873, they married at St John's Parish Church in Manchester. They had 10 children in 11 years. By this time John was a full partner in the cotton business and was living in a large house like his uncle.

He pursued his theatrical ambitions and became stage manager of an amateur theatrical group made up of local business people who would perform a Minstrels act in Manchester theatres. In 1885 John became director of the Comedy Theatre Manchester. During the same year, he began teaching children to dance. His early pupils practised for hours every Saturday afternoon amongst the bales of cotton in one of the firm's warehouses. He also taught at his home, to the disapproval of his wife.

His first dance performances were at small local church dances, and due to his position as director of the Comedy Theatre Manchester, he was able to arrange for his small dancers a place in the theatre's Christmas pantomime (his first real performance although not credited at the time).

At this time everything went wrong for him in his uncle's business. His uncle's son who was now old enough to work was brought into the family business. His uncle became an alcoholic. John had a violent quarrel with his uncle; John stormed out and set up his own business, never speaking with his uncle again.

John Tiller carried on presenting dancers in an amateur capacity. By this time, his real interest was with the theatre and dance, and he was getting bored with the cotton industry.

In 1890 John was asked to present a quartet of children for the pantomime "Robinson Crusoe" at the Prince of Wales Theatre, Liverpool. He chose four of his best Manchester pupils, all aged about 10 years: Dolly Grey, Tessie Lomax, and twins Cissy and Lilly Smith. They were all the same height and had the same very slender shape with dark hair. He worked with them until they were perfect. At times they were so exhausted they had to be carried home by their parents, their feet too blistered to walk. These were the first of thousands of Tiller Girls. The four girls presented a burlesque routine and a "Coconut dance" popular at the time. The pantomime lasted for three months with every show generating glowing reports in the newspapers and receiving awards for the girls and their manager. But the fee received for this only barely covered expenses and costs. This first experience helped John make up his mind to become a professional manager.

John's wife Mary died of cancer in 1905 and he remarried to Jennie Walker in 1906. Jennie was very involved in the running of the Tiller Schools until her death in February 1936.

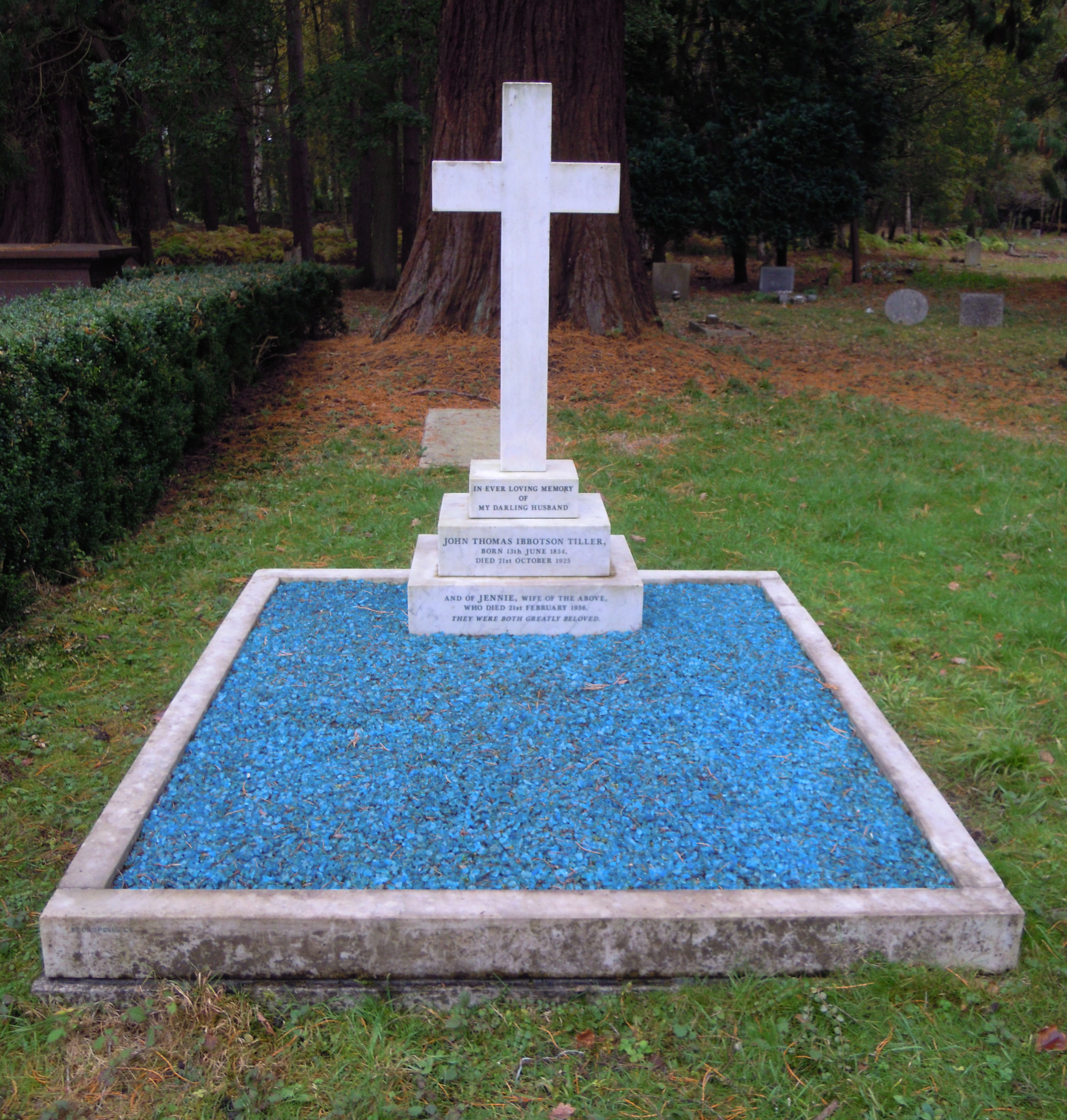
The grave of John Tiller in Brookwood Cemetery

John Tiller died on 22 October 1925 in Lenox Hill Hospital, New York. His body was brought back to London and travelled to Brookwood Cemetery on the special funeral train.

== High Kicks ==
By the late 19th century John's troupes were dancing in ballet and pantomime performances all over the world. At this time John conceived the Mystic Hussars routine, where the girls dressed as cavaliers when performing their dance routine. As the girls were kicking; he had them link their arms around each other's waists. The proximity helped the girls work well together and at last he was able to achieve absolute precision in dance. His dream had come true. There is speculation among his descendants as to whether he adopted the kicking and headdress after watching the Lipizzaner stallions on one of his many trips abroad.

John went on to perfect a high-kicking dance for the Folies-Bergère, Paris. The dance used eight girls and was called the Pony Trot. It was the first of all modern kick routines and the routine that every Tiller Girl had to learn as their first dance.

== The American Connection ==
John first sent a troupe of girls to America in 1900. George Lederer booked them to perform their original Pony Trot. Later, at the height of their popularity in New York there were three Tiller lines working on Broadway: The Lollipops and The Sunshine Girls at the Globe Theatre, and 24 Tiller Girls in the Ziegfeld Follies.

Charles Dillingham and George White had visited The Palace Theatre in London and booked the girls to appear in "Good Morning Dearie" at George White's Scandals of 1923 and The Nifties of 1923. Florenz Ziegfeld took 48 of the girls under contract for three years for his follies.

In New York City, John Tiller opened a dance school at 226 West 72nd Street, with offices and a training studio. It was run by Mary Read, a Head Tiller Girl from England who had been one of the 1916 Sunshine Girls in America, She trained American pupils as well as the girls from the United Kingdom. She was a hard taskmaster, but a good business woman who had John Tiller's full support in everything she did. The girls always called her Miss Read. In the 1920s, John Tiller was regularly crossing the world to finalise contracts. He always made sure his trip ended up in New York so he could meet Mary.

After John's death in 1925, Mary Read signed a very profitable contract with RKO studios. Many Tiller Girls worked in American films and danced all over the USA. Many girls married and settled in America, most of them dancing and choreographing in American shows. Mary closed the American Tiller School in 1935 and married Donald Leman Clark, PhD, a professor of rhetoric at Columbia University in New York. (source: Boltz family archives)

== Tiller schools ==
The Tiller schools remained open and run by Doris Alloway, Barbara Aitken and R.J. Smith. In 1973 the Tiller school was taken over by the impresario Robert Luff, with Barbara Aitken remaining as director and choreographer. It is said it would have taken about three months to turn an experienced dancer into a Tiller Girl.

John Tiller died in 1925. By then, the (Casino de Paris – Paris en Fleurs program) was called the "Lawrence Tiller Girls". John's wife kept the school running until her death in the mid 1930s.

The John Tiller School of Dance including Ballet and Tap training & Modern and Ballroom is continued by Bernard Tiller.
