= Sunny Rogers =

Sunny Rogers (10 May 1913 – 30 December 2005) was an English entertainer best known for her work with comedian Frankie Howerd.

Rogers was born Jessie Mary Rogerson in Ashton-under-Lyne, Lancashire. Her nickname "Sunny" came from her constant smiling. When attending the Welbeck Street Primary School, the headmistress wrote to her parents saying that "You really should consider sending little Jessie for dancing lessons as she entertains us all day with her singing and dancing."

Rogers began as a dancer at the Trocadero in London and then joined the Tiller Girls; she went on from there to become a choreographer and producer of floor shows.

With her deadpan comedy expression, she became the long-suffering sidekick of Frankie Howerd, a role she played for over 35 years. She was his accompanying pianist who would be continually mocked by the comedian ("She's deaf you know - can't hear a word - poor old soul!"). One of the best examples of her work with the star is the Channel 4 hour-long special "Superfrank!" recorded in 1986.

After Frankie Howerd died in 1992, Sunny retired to Brighton, Sussex, where she continued to help show business charities. Rogers died at age 92 at a nursing home in Worthing.
