= Topless (play) =

One-woman stage play by Miles Tredinnick

Topless by Miles Tredinnick

Topless is a one-woman stage play by Miles Tredinnick. It is set on an open-top sightseeing bus and features tour guide Sandie revealing her personal life while pointing out the London sights. The play, produced by The Big Bus Company, ran for two seasons in London, firstly in 1999 (directed by Martin Bailey) and then in 2000 (directed by Miles Tredinnick). The role of Sandie was played by three actresses: Rachael Carter, Alexandra Moses and Serena Hansen. Although the play was written to be performed in theatres, the original production was actually performed on the open-top of a double-decker bus driving around the streets of London.

An acting edition was published by Matador Books in 2006 and a Kindle ebook version came out in 2011.

== Bibliography ==
- Topless (2000 Comedy Hall Books) ISBN 0-9537601-0-3
- Jean Marlow Audition Speeches for Women - Extract from Topless. (2001 A&C Black) ISBN 0-7136-5276-4
- Topless - new edition (2006 Matador Books) ISBN 1-905237-75-8
