= Superfrank! =

English variety special

- Created by: Miles Tredinnick
- Starring: Frankie Howerd
- Country of origin: United Kingdom
- Original language: English

Production
- Running time: 51 minutes

Original release
- Network: Channel 4, HTV
- Release: 12 January 1987

Superfrank! is a 1987 one-hour television special starring English comedian Frankie Howerd OBE. The special show marked his return to television performance after an absence of five years.

The show was made by Channel 4 and HTV. The script was written by Miles Tredinnick, Vince Powell and Andrew Nickolds and recorded before a live audience at the Playhouse Theatre in Weston-super-Mare close to where Howerd had his country home in the Mendip Hills. At one stage he is joined by some donkeys who do their best to upstage him. Howerd ends the show with some songs accompanied on the piano by Sunny Rogers. The show was produced by Cecil Korer and Derek Clark. It was transmitted on 12 January 1987.

The show's working title was 'Let's Be Frank!'

== DVD release ==
Superfrank! is available on DVD as part of the two-disc Network DVD release Oh, Please Yourselves - Frankie Howerd at ITV.
