= The Punk Rock Collection =

London The Punk Rock Collection

Compilation album by London
- Released: 1997
- Recorded: 1977 IBC Studios
- Genre: Punk rock
- Label: Captain Oi! Records
- Producer: Simon Napier-Bell

London album chronology
Animal Games (1978)	London The Punk Rock Collection (1997)	Get Out Of London (2012)

Professional ratings
Review scores
Source	Rating
AllMusic	3/5 stars

London The Punk Rock Collection is a CD containing all the MCA recordings of the 1970s punk band London. All the group's A & B sides are included as well as their entire 1978 Animal Games album. In addition there are biographical notes and color photographs of the band's record sleeves. The album was released in 1997. Its catalogue number is AHOY CD77.

== Personnel ==
- Riff Regan (Lead vocals)
- Jon Moss (Drums)
- Steve Voice (Bass & backing vocals)
- Dave Wight (Guitar)
- Simon Napier-Bell - Producer
- Hugh Jones - recording engineer
- John Van der Kiste - Liner notes

== Track listing/composer ==
1. "No Time" (Riff Regan)
2. "Animal Games" (Riff Regan, Dave Wight, Jon Moss, Steve Voice)
3. "Reaction" (Riff Regan & Steve Voice)
4. "Everyone's A Winner" (Riff Regan)
5. "Summer Of Love" (Riff Regan)
6. "Us Kids Cold" (Riff Regan, Dave Wight, Jon Moss, Steve Voice)
7. "Young" (Riff Regan)
8. "Good Looking Girls" (Riff Regan & Steve Voice)
9. "Out On The Skids" (Riff Regan & Steve Voice)
10. "Speed Speed" (Riff Regan & Steve Voice)
11. "Swinging London" (Riff Regan, Dave Wight, Jon Moss, Steve Voice)
12. "Everyone's A Winner" (single version) - (Riff Regan)
13. "Handcuffed" (Riff Regan & Steve Voice)
14. "Friday on My Mind" (Vanda & Young)
15. "Siouxsie Sue" (Steve Voice)
