= The Frankie Howerd Show =

- Genre: Comedy
- Written by: Ken Finkleman; Bill Lynn; Jerry O'Flanagan
- Starring: Frankie Howerd
- Country of origin: Canada
- Original language: English
- No. of seasons: 1
- No. of episodes: 13

Production
- Producers: Norman Campbell; Bill Lynn
- Running time: 30 minutes

Original release
- Network: CBC Television
- Release: 26 February – 5 June 1976

The Frankie Howerd Show is a Canadian comedy television series that aired on CBC Television in 1976. Howerd was an established British comic who was placed in a Canadian setting for this series.

== Premise ==
Originally titled Oooh, Canada, Frankie Howerd stars as a Briton living in Toronto who attempts to find work in Canada. He lives in a decrepit Toronto rooming house operated by landlady Mrs. Otterby (Ruth Springford) and her son (Gary Files). Other regular characters were Wally Wheeler (Jack Duffy), a fugitive from alimony, and Denise (Peggy Mahon), a dancer and model who is often the butt of Howerd's lewd jokes.

== Scheduling ==
This half-hour series was broadcast on Thursdays at 9:00 p.m. (Eastern) from 26 February to 8 April 1976 then on Saturdays at 8:30 p.m. from 24 April to 5 June 1976.
