= St Gregory's Church, Weare =

Anglican church in Somerset, England

Church of St Gregory
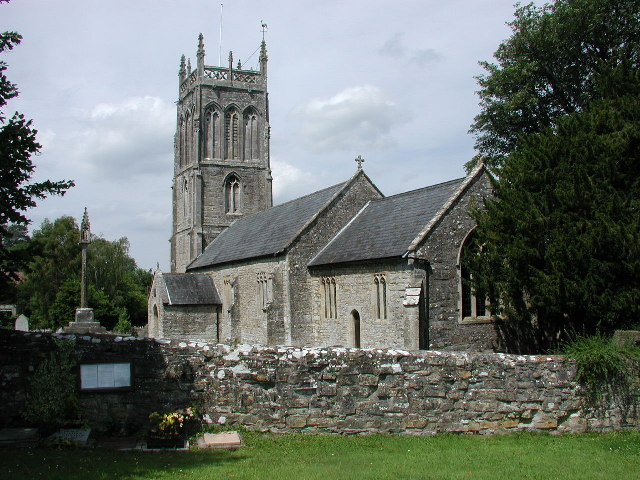

- Location within Somerset

General information
- Location: Weare, England
- Coordinates: 51.2702°N 2.8413°W
- Completed: 11th century

The Church of St Gregory in Weare, Somerset, England dates from the 11th century, although most of the building is from the 15th, and has been designated as a grade I listed building.

The tower was built around 1407. It is in four stages with pinnacles and pierced parapet.

In the churchyard is a 15th-century cross, and a 19th-century church room.

In 1257 the church was granted to St Augustine's Abbey in Bristol, and after the Dissolution of the Monasteries it was given to its successor institution, the dean and chapter of Bristol Cathedral.

The font is older than the building dating from about 1150, while the pulpit is Jacobean.

The parish is part of the Crook Peak benefice within the Axbridge deanery.

The English comedian Frankie Howerd is buried in the churchyard.

== See also ==
- Grade I listed buildings in Sedgemoor
- List of Somerset towers
- List of ecclesiastical parishes in the Diocese of Bath and Wells
