= Frankie Howerd Strikes Again =

Television series

- Genre: Sitcom
- Directed by: Alan Tarrant
- Starring: Frankie Howerd
- Country of origin: United Kingdom
- Original language: English
- No. of series: 1
- No. of episodes: 6

Production
- Running time: 30 minutes
- Production company: Yorkshire Television

Original release
- Network: ITV

Frankie Howerd Strikes Again is a British comedy television series which originally aired on ITV in 1981. It was a sketch show produced by Yorkshire Television, in the style of Howerd's earlier series.

As well as Howerd, other performers who appeared in the series included Henry McGee, Neil Innes, Linda Cunningham, Jeanne Mockford, Norman Chappell, Claire Davenport, Ronnie Brody, Hilda Fenemore and Anneka Rice.

== Bibliography ==
- Newcomb, Horace. Encyclopedia of Television. Routledge, 2014.
