= Rambling Syd Rumpo =

Fictional radio character

Rambling Syd Rumpo was a folk singer character, played by the English comedian and actor Kenneth Williams, originally in the 1960s BBC Radio comedy series Round the Horne.

== History ==
The Rambling Syd sketches generally began with a short discourse on the nature of the song, which would then follow. The discourses and the songs involved suggestiveness and double entendre. Rambling Syd was customarily introduced by Kenneth Horne, who would set things up by (for example) inquiring as to the nature and origin of the song. Rambling Syd would usually respond with an "Ello, me dearios", before launching into the ensuing detailed explanation, which left a great deal to the imagination.

The songs themselves pushed and extended boundaries of sexual suggestiveness, using nonsense (or little-known) words such as "moolies" and "nadgers" in suggestive contexts. Many of the words used by Rambling Syd were invented by the Round the Horne scriptwriters Barry Took and Marty Feldman, who wrote the majority of the songs' lyrics, based upon traditional folk songs. Some were existing words used in a suggestive context, such as "artefacts" (often used in an archaeological context for items such as grave goods) and "nadgers", which had already appeared in The Goon Show.

On 3 July 1967, Williams, in the guise of Rambling Syd, recorded a series of the songs before a live audience at Abbey Road Studios. In his diary, Williams wrote that, "the laughter was so intrusive it broke up the rhythm of some of the songs". One of the producers told Williams that the audience had been given a party before the recording and most were drunk.

This is a lyrical excerpt of "Good King Boroslav", from a Christmas episode, Cinderella, first broadcast on Christmas Eve, 1967:

Good King Boroslav looked out,
On the night of grungers,
Saw them wurdling round about,
Armed with rubber plungers,
Brightly shone their artefacts,
Red their possets glowing,
He knew not from whence they came, (switches back into suggestive accent)
But 'e knew where they were going!

In 1975, Williams starred with Leslie Phillips, Lance Percival, Miriam Margolyes and others, in the short-lived radio sketch show Oh, Get On with It, based on a pilot episode entitled Get On With It, which also featured appearances by Rambling Syd.

Sid James portrayed "The Rumpo Kid" in the film Carry On Cowboy (1965) starring alongside Kenneth Williams.

== Songs ==
- "The Terrible Tale of the Somerset Nog"
  (to the tune of "Widecombe Fair")
- "D'ye Ken Jim Pubes"
  (to the tune of "D'ye Ken John Peel")
- "Green Grow My Nadgers Oh!"
  (to the tune of "Green Grow the Rushes, O")
- "The Ballad of the Woggler's Moulie"
  (to the tune of "Oh My Darling, Clementine")
- "The Taddle Gropers' Dance"
  (to the tune of "Here We Go Round the Mulberry Bush")
- "What Shall We Do With The Drunken Nurker"
  (to the tune of "Drunken Sailor")
- "Song of the Bogle Clencher"
  (to the tune of "The Lincolnshire Poacher")
- "'Twas on the Good Ship Habakkuk"
  (to the tune of "Good Ship Venus")
- "Clacton Bogle Picker's Lament"
- "Runcorn Splod Cobbler's Song"
- "Granny Went a-Wandering"
- "Song of the Australian Outlaw"
  (to the tune of "Waltzing Matilda")
- "The Black Grunger of Hounslow"
  (to the tune of "The Old Orange Flute")
- "Gladys Is At It Again"
- "The Grommet Tinker's Song"
- "Song of the Herring-Fisherman of Hampstead Garden Suburb"
  (to the tune of "Oh Shenandoah")
- "My Grussett Lies a Fallowing-oh"
- "Goosenadgers Fair"
  (to the tune of "Strawberry Fair")
- "Bind my Plooms with Silage"
- "The Russet-Banger Ditty"
- "The Lung-Wormer's Gavotte"
- "Good King Boroslav"
  (to the tune of "Good King Wenceslas")
- "Sussex Whirdling Song"
  (to the tune of "Foggy, Foggy Dew")
- "Tinker's Lament"
- "The Ballad of the Royal Scottish Pretender (Posselwaite Lament)"
- "Pewter Woggler's Bangling Song"
  (to the tune of "Come Landlord Fill The Flowing Bowl")
- "Sea Shanty Medley"
- "A Lummockshire Air"
- "Soldier Soldier"
- "The Ballad of Loombogles Boom"

== Recordings ==
- "The Ballad of the Woggler's Moulie"/"Green Grow My Nadgers Oh" (Single 1967)
- Rambling Syd Rumpo In Concert (EP 1967)
- Rambling Syd Rumpo In Concert (Vol 2) (EP 1968)
- The Best of Rambling Syd Rumpo (Album 1970)
- Rambling Syd Rumpo: Starring Kenneth Williams & Kenneth Horne: 40 Warbles from "Round the Horne"'s Doyen of Folk Singers (CD 1996)
- The Best of Rambling Syd Rumpo (CD 2005)

Two Rambling Syd Rumpo songs, "The Ballad of the Woggler's Moulie" and "Green Grow My Nadgers Oh", were also included in the 1971 compilation album, Oh! What a Carry On!.
