= Anthea Fraser =

English crime fiction writer (born 1930)

Anthea Mary Fraser (née Roby; born 1930) is a British novelist, known for her mystery thrillers.

== Life and career ==
Anthea Mary Roby was born in Lancashire in 1930. Her mother was a published novelist and she began composing poems and stories before she could write. At the age of five she announced that she wanted to be an author. However, despite having been a prolific writer in school, she did not become a professional writer until after her two daughters were born. On 22 March 1956, Roby married Ian Mackintosh Fraser in Lancashire.

Her first professional publications were short stories. Her first novel was published in 1970. Her first significant success was with her 1974 novel Laura Possessed, which had a paranormal theme, and was followed by 6 other similarly themed novels. She then wrote some romantic suspense stories before turning to writing crime fiction.

Fraser created two mystery novel series, the first featuring 'Detective Chief Inspector David Webb' with the Shillingham police. There are 16 novels in this series, the last twelve of which bear titles based on the lyrics to the traditional English folk song Green Grow the Rushes, O.

The second series features 'Rona Parish', a biographer and freelance journalist.

She served as secretary of the Crime Writers' Association from 1986 to 1996. She has also published five novels under the pen name 'Vanessa Graham'.

== Novels ==
- Designs of Annabelle, 1971
- In the Balance, 1973 (short story)
- Laura Possessed: A Novel of Suspense, 1974
- Home Through the Dark, 1974
- Whistler’s Lane: A Novel of Suspense, 1975
- Breath of Brimstone, 1977
- Presence of Mind, 1978
- Island-in-Waiting, 1979
- The Stone, 1980
- The Macbeth Prophecy, 1995
- Motive for Murder, 1996
- Dangerous Deception, 1998
- Past Shadows, 2001
- Fathers and Daughters, 2002
- Thicker than Water, 2009
- Shifting Sands, 2011
- the Unburied Past, 2013
- A Tangled Thread, 2015
- Sins of the Fathers, 2018

Novels featuring DCI David Webb

- A Shroud for Delilah, 1984
- A Necessary End, 1985
- Pretty Maids All in a Row, 1986
- Death Speaks Softly, 1987
- The Nine Bright Shiners, 1987
- Six Proud Walkers, 1988
- The April Rainers, 1989
- Symbols at Your Door, 1990
- The Lily-White Boys (Also published as I'll Sing You Two-O), 1991
- Three, Three the Rivals, 1992
- The Gospel Makers, 1994
- The Seven Stars, 1995
- One Is One and All Alone, 1996
- The Ten Commandments, 1997
- Eleven That Went Up to Heaven, 1999
- The Twelve Apostles, 1999

Novels featuring Rona Parish

- Brought to Book, 2003
- Jigsaw, 2004
- Person or Persons Unknown, 2005
- A Family Concern, 2006
- Rogue in Porcelain, 2007
- Next Door to Murder, 2008
- Unfinished Portrait, 2010
- A Question of Identity, 2012
- Justice Postponed, 2014
- Retribution, 2016

Novels written under the pen name 'Vanessa Graham'

- In the Balance, 1973
- Time on Trial, 1979
- Second Time Around, 1982
- The Stand-In, 1984
- Such Men Are Dangerous, 1988
