= Oh! What a Carry On! =

Oh! What A Carry On!

Compilation album by various artists from the Carry On... film series.
- Released: June 1971
- Label: Music For Pleasure

Oh! What A Carry On! is a 1971 compilation album of songs performed by actors from the Carry On... film series, and released on the budget Music For Pleasure label (MFP 1416). Many were novelty songs with most, such as those by Jim Dale, having previously been released as singles. None were recorded specifically for this album or had any direct relationship to the Carry On films. For example, Kenneth Williams' songs as Rambling Syd Rumpo, which Gramophone magazine described as the best on the album, were taken from Round the Horne and Jim Dale's songs had been hits in the 1950s.

It was reissued by EMI Records in 2004 as a 2-CD set, with many additional tracks by actors associated with the Carry On... series.

== Track listing ==
=== 1971 LP ===
Side 1

1. Jim Dale - "Be My Girl" (UK No. 2 in 1957)
2. Bernard Bresslaw - "You Need Feet"
3. Barbara Windsor - "On Mother Kelly's Doorstep"
4. Frankie Howerd - "It's All Right with Me"
5. Kenneth Williams (as Rambling Syd Rumpo) - "Green Grow My Nadgers Oh"
6. Joan Sims - "Spring Song"

Side 2

1. Kenneth Connor - "The Ugly Duckling"
2. Jim Dale - "Piccadilly Line"
3. Dora Bryan - "Diamonds Are a Girl's Best Friend"
4. Frankie Howerd - "Song and Dance Man"
5. Joan Sims - "Men"
6. Kenneth Williams (as Rambling Syd Rumpo) - "The Ballad of the Woggler's Moulie"

=== 2004 CD reissue ===
Disc 1

1. Sid James and Liz Fraser - "Double Bunk"
2. Kenneth Williams - "Boring Old Edna"
3. Kenneth Cope and Lance Percival - "Good Day to You, Sir"
4. Frankie Howerd - "Up Pompeii"
5. Kenneth Williams - "Mad Dogs and Englishmen"
6. Jim Dale - "I'm in the Market for You"
7. Kenneth Williams (as Rambling Syd Rumpo) - "The Drunken Nurker"
8. Michael Medwin, Bernard Bresslaw and Alfie Bass - "What Do We Do in the Army"
9. Bernard Cribbins - "Right Said Fred" (UK No. 10 in 1962)
10. Eric Sykes and Hattie Jacques - "Interview"
11. Barbara Windsor - "A Little Bit Of What You Fancy Does You Good"
12. Sid James - "The Ooter Song"
13. Wilfrid Brambell and Harry H. Corbett - "Steptoe & Son at the Palace"
14. Kenneth Williams (as Rambling Syd Rumpo) - "Song of the Australian Outlaw"
15. Kenneth Williams - "For Adults Only"
16. Windsor Davies and Don Estelle - "Whispering Grass" (UK No. 1 in 1975)
17. Jim Dale - "Be My Girl"
18. Michael Medwin, Bernard Bresslaw and Alfie Bass - "The Army Game"
19. Bernard Cribbins - "Gossip Calipso" (UK No. 25 in 1962)
20. Sid James - "Hymn For A Sunday"
21. Frankie Howerd and June Whitfield - "Up Je T'Aime"
22. Kenneth Williams (as Rambling Syd Rumpo) - "The Ballad of the Woggler's Moulie"
23. Joan Sims - "Spring Song"
24. Windsor Davies - "Mandalay"
25. Bill Maynard - "Pheasant Plucker's Son"

Disc 2

1. Barbara Windsor - "On Mother Kelly's Doorstep"
2. Sid James - "Put On a Happy Face"
3. Stanley Unwin - "Classicold Musee"
4. Bernard Cribbins - "The Hole in the Ground" (UK No. 9 in 1962)
5. Kenneth Williams (as Rambling Syd Rumpo) - "Green Grow My Nadgers Oh!"
6. Wilfrid Brambell - "Secondhand"
7. Kenneth Williams - "Don't Put Your Daughter on the Stage"
8. Jim Dale - "Piccadilly Line"
9. Anita Harris - "Back in the Old Routine"
10. Bernard Bresslaw - "I Only Asked"
11. Harry H. Corbett - "Junk Shop"
12. Kenneth Williams (as Rambling Syd Rumpo) - "Pewter Wooglers Bangling Song"
13. Sid James - "Kids"
14. Barbara Windsor - "Ten Gallon Hat"
15. Barbara Windsor - "Sparrows Can't Sing"
16. Roy Castle - "Stormy Weather"
17. Bernard Bresslaw - "You Need Feet"
18. Kenneth Williams (as Rambling Syd Rumpo) - "Runcorn Splod Cobblers Song"
19. Roy Castle - "Pennies from Heaven"
20. Anita Harris - "Mr. One and Only"
21. Bernard Bresslaw - "Ivy Will Cling"
22. Jim Dale - "Jane Belinda"
23. Bill Maynard - "She Was"
