= Red fly the banners o =

Red Fly the Banners, O, or Trotsky's Lament is a British and Irish folk song expressing (often tongue-in-cheek) Marxist-Leninist political views. It is based on, and sung to the tune of, the traditional English ballad Green Grow the Rushes, O.

== Lyrics ==
Like many folk songs, Red Fly the Banners, O has multiple versions; all are cumulative in form. The version sung has tended to indicate which particular left grouping the singer adheres to. As with 'Green Grow the Rushes', the third verse is usually sung with exaggerated emphasis.

The Stalinist version builds to a 14th and final verse as follows:

I'll sing you fourteen, O!

Red fly the banners, O!
What is your fourteen, O?

Fourteen for the IQ of the average Trot,
Thirteen for the holes in Trotsky's head,
Twelve for the hours on the Kremlin clock,
Eleven for the Moscow Dynamos,
Ten for the days that shook the world,
Nine for the days of the General Strike,
Eight for the hours of the working day,
Seven for the stars on the Connolly's flag,
Six for the Tolpuddle Martyrs,
Five for the years of the Five-Year Plan
And four for the four years taken!
Three, three, the Rights of Man,
Two, two, the workers' arms, toiling for his living, O,
One is workers' unity and evermore shall be so!

=== Fourth verse ===
Because of the dependence of "four years" on "five years", the 4th verse must use a different "Four for ...". One version is:

I'll sing you four, O!

Red fly the banners, O!
What is your four, O?

Four for the Heroes of the Cause!

Marx! Engels! Lenin! Stalin!

Three, three ...

Trotskyist version:

I'll sing you four, o,
Red fly the banners, o.
What is your four, o?
Four for the four great teachers. [Marx, Engels, Lenin and Trotsky]

The full Trotskyist version - the version most commonly heard from the mid 1960s onward - was

Ten for the days that shook the world
And nine for the works of Lenin
Eight for the hours of a working day
Seven for the days of a five day week
And six for the Tolpuddle Martyrs
Five for the years of a five year plan
And four for the International*
Three, three, the Rights of Man
Two, two, the worker's hands
Working for a living - O
One is workers' Unity
And evermore shall be so.

- The Fourth International of Trotskyist parties

Alternatively:

Nine for the nine bright satellite states
Eight for the eighth red army

Another version has:

Eight for the Eighth Route Army
Seven for the stars of the Starry Plough
