= Laugh? I Nearly Went to Miami! =

Stage play by Miles Tredinnick

- First Edition UK cover
- Author: Miles Tredinnick
- Language: English
- Genre: stage play
- Publisher: Samuel French Ltd
- Publication date: 1986
- Publication place: United Kingdom
- Media type: Print (paperback)
- Pages: 66p.
- ISBN: 978-0-573-01633-2
- OCLC: 18748067
- Dewey Decimal: 822/.914 19
- LC Class: PR6070.R354 L38 1986

Laugh? I Nearly Went to Miami! is a stage comedy by Miles Tredinnick. It was first produced in Hampstead, London, in 1985 and published the following year by Samuel French Ltd. A revised Kindle eBook version was released in 2012. It has been translated into many languages and is regularly produced around the world. It is in two acts and has a cast of four men and three women. A sequel, It's Now or Never!, was first published in 1991 by Warner Chappell Plays.

...Und morgen fliegen wir nach Miami is the German version of Laugh? I Nearly Went to Miami!, although the direct German translation would be "...And Tomorrow We're Flying to Miami." The play has been successfully produced throughout Austria and Germany in translations by Ursula Lyn and Adolf Opel. The original production was staged at the Kleine Komödie Theatre in Vienna in 1987 and was directed by Cyril Frankel. The play starred Gaby Jacoby, Viktor Couzyn, Rudolf Otahal and Birgit Machalissa.

This was followed by another successful run in Munich in 1989 that starred Hans-Jürgen Bäumler, Jutta Boll, Frithof Vierock and Marlene Budde. The director was Harald Leipnitz.

We hebben ze zien vliegen! is the Dutch version of Laugh? I Nearly Went to Miami!. It was translated by Martine Deboosere and published by Toneelfonds J. Janssens in 1991.

Elvis, oltár, Miami is the Hungarian version of Laugh? I Nearly Went to Miami! and was first produced by Bánfalvy Stúdió in Budapest in 2016 . The play, translated by Benedek Albert, starred Hujber Ferenc, Tamás Vastag, Ágnes Bánfalvy, Bugár Anna, Görgényi Fruzsina, Kiss Ramóna, Urmai Gábor, and Faragó András. The director was Harmath Imre.

== Characters & synopsis ==
- Tom Weals - the biggest Elvis Presley fan in the world.
- Alice Martin - Tom's fiancée.
- Barney Weals - Tom's brother.
- Muriel - Barney's new girlfriend.
- Auntie - Alice's aunt.
- Frankie - local thug.
- Inspector Hendy - police officer.

Laugh? I Nearly Went To Miami! is a zany and fast moving comedy of confusion. When Tom Weals, an Elvis fanatic, and Alice his fiancée are unable, due to fog, to fly to Miami for an Elvis Presley Convention, they arrive back at Tom's Essex flat to find that they have inadvertently picked up the wrong suitcases at the airport and are now in possession of half a million dollars.

Further confusion arises with the arrival of, firstly, Tom's flashy brother Barney, who is hoping to use the flat to seduce Muriel his latest girlfriend and is none too pleased to find Tom at home, then Alice's eccentric Auntie, with a bag containing $20,000 (a wedding present for Tom and Alice), then Frankie, a thug working for the owner of the suitcase dollars, whom Tom and Alice assume is a member of the local constabulary, and finally, Inspector Hendy, a real policeman, who somehow manages to sort everything out!
