= Weare, Somerset =

Village in Somerset, England

Coordinates: 51.269°N 2.840°W

Weare
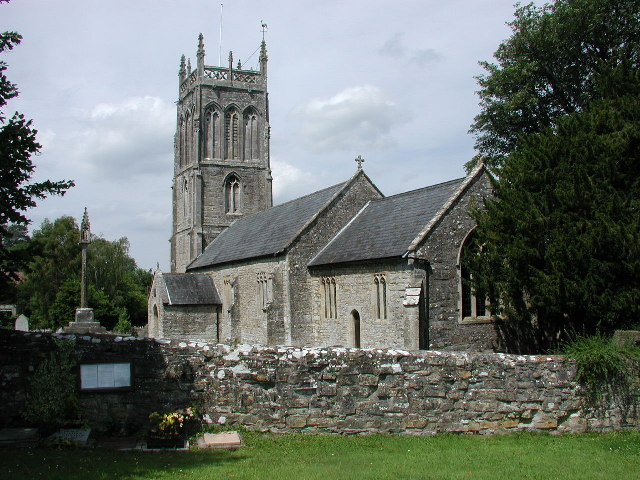
- Church of St Gregory, Weare

- Location within Somerset
- Population: 658 (2011)
- OS grid reference: ST415525
- Unitary authority: Somerset Council
- Ceremonial county: Somerset
- Region: South West
- Country: England
- Sovereign state: United Kingdom
- Post town: AXBRIDGE
- Postcode district: BS26
- Dialling code: 01934
- Police: Avon and Somerset
- Fire: Devon and Somerset
- Ambulance: South Western
- UK Parliament: Wells and Mendip Hills

Weare is a village and civil parish in Somerset, England, on the River Axe, south of the Mendip Hills. Other settlements in the parish are the village of Lower Weare, the hamlets of Alston Sutton, Brinscombe, and Sparrow Hill, and part of the hamlet of Stone Allerton.

== History ==
The name of the village may come from a weir on the River Axe.

After the Norman Conquest the manor was granted to Walter of Douai and then passed to the Gaunt, Gourney and Brythemore families. The Gourneys established a borough original called Nether Weare and later Lower Weare, and were granted the right to hold fairs and even sent members to the Parliament of England. This new borough declined after 1316; however a borough court was still being held in Lower Weare in 1603.

Alston Sutton was a separate manor at the time of the Domesday Book in 1086. The name means Aethelnoth's settlement and was held in 1286 by Walter de Sutton. The village declined by 1548 and was largely demolished soon afterwards.

Weare was part of the hundred of Bempstone.

== Governance ==
The parish council has responsibility for local issues, including setting an annual precept (local rate) to cover the council's operating costs and producing annual accounts for public scrutiny. The parish council evaluates local planning applications and works with the local police, district council officers, and neighbourhood watch groups on matters of crime, security, and traffic. The parish council's role also includes initiating projects for the maintenance and repair of parish facilities, as well as consulting with the district council on the maintenance, repair, and improvement of highways, drainage, footpaths, public transport, and street cleaning. Conservation matters (including trees and listed buildings) and environmental issues are also the responsibility of the council.

For local government purposes, since 1 April 2023, the village comes under the unitary authority of Somerset Council. Prior to this, it was part of the non-metropolitan district of Sedgemoor, which was formed on 1 April 1974 under the Local Government Act 1972, having previously been part of Axbridge Rural District.

It is also part of the Wells and Mendip Hills county constituency represented in the House of Commons of the Parliament of the United Kingdom. It elects one Member of Parliament (MP) by the first past the post system of election.

== Religious sites ==
St. Gregory's Church dates from the 11th century and has been designated by English Heritage as a Grade I listed building. In the churchyard are a 15th-century cross, and a 19th-century church room. In 1257 the church was granted to St Augustine's Abbey in Bristol and after the dissolution of the monasteries given to the dean and chapter of Bristol Cathedral.

== Education ==
Weare has a First School (teaching Reception through year 4) with a pre-school nursery on-site. Weare Academy First School and Rainbow Woods Pre-school was founded in 1895 and is part of Wessex Learning Trust. Also in the village is a private pre-school nursery called Notting Hill Pre-school.

== Notable residents ==
- Alfred Brice, Welsh international rugby union forward who played club rugby for Aberavon and Cardiff, was born in Weare.
- Frankie Howerd, an English comedian, who lived nearby at Wavering Down in Cross, is buried in St. Gregory's Church graveyard.
