= Because of Mr Darrow =

Because of Mr Darrow is a comedy stage play by Miles Tredinnick. It was first produced in London in 1982 at the Finborough Arms Theatre in Earl's Court and later transferred to the Grove Theatre in Hammersmith. It was recorded as a radio play for the Royal Free Hospital, Hampstead's in-house radio station in 1985.
