= Tony Roper =

Tony Roper may refer to:

- Tony Roper (racing driver) (1964–2000), NASCAR driver
- Tony Roper (actor) (born 1941), Scottish actor, comedian, playwright and writer
