= Green Grow the Rushes, O =

English folk song

"Green Grow the Rushes, O" (alternatively "Ho" or "Oh") (also known as "The Twelve Prophets", "The Carol of the Twelve Numbers", "The Teaching Song", "The Dilly Song", or "The Ten Commandments"), is an English folk song (Roud #133). It is sometimes sung as a Christmas carol. It often takes the form of antiphon, where one voice calls and is answered by a chorus.

The song is not to be confused with Robert Burns's similarly titled "Green Grow the Rashes".

It is cumulative in structure, with each verse built up from the previous one by appending a new stanza. The first verse is:

I'll sing you one, O
Green grow the rushes, O
What is your one, O?
One is one and all alone
And evermore shall be so.

There are many variants of the song, collected by musicologists including Sabine Baring-Gould and Cecil Sharp from the West of England at the start of the twentieth century. The stanzas are clearly much corrupted and often obscure, but the references are generally agreed to be both Biblical and astronomical.

== Lyrics ==
The twelfth, cumulated, verse runs:

I'll sing you twelve, O
Green grow the rushes, O
What are your twelve, O?
Twelve for the twelve Apostles
Eleven for the eleven who went to heaven,
Ten for the ten commandments,
Nine for the nine bright shiners, (Note: Or "Nine for the nine that shine by night")
Eight for the April Rainers. (Note: Or "April Showerers", or occasionally "Eight for the eight bold Rangers", or "for the eight bow rainers" i.e. 8 colours of the rainbow)
Seven for the seven stars in the sky, (Note: Or "Seven for the seven who went to Heaven")
Six for the six proud walkers, (Note: Or "brown walkers")
Five for the symbols at your door, (Note: Or "my door")
Four for the Gospel makers,
Three, three, the rivals,
Two, two, the lily-white boys,
Clothed all in green, O (Note: Or "Clothe them all in green, oh oh" or "Dressèd all in green, o o", or "Clad them all in Green, O", or "All adorned in green, O")
One is one and all alone (Note: Or "One is one and one alone", "One and one is all alone", "One is one and stands alone", or "One is one and always one")
And evermore shall be so.

== Origins ==
The lyrics of the song are, in many places, exceedingly obscure, and present an unusual mixture of Christian catechesis, astronomical mnemonics, and what may be pagan cosmology. The musicologist Cecil Sharp, influential in the folklore revival in England, noted in his 1916 One Hundred English Folksongs that the words are "so corrupt, indeed, that in some cases we can do little more than guess at their original meaning".

The song's origins and age are uncertain: however, a counting song with similar lyrics, but without the 'Green grow the rushes' chorus, was sung by English children in the first half of the 19th century. (Note: In the Notes and Queries version of 1868, a chorus is not mentioned, but the song began "What shall we sing O? We shall sing the ones O. The complete sequence, as recalled by the 1868 correspondent from his boyhood, ran: Twelve twelve Apostles, Eleven arch-angels, Ten ten commandments, Nine bright shiners (?) Eight Gabriel angels. Seven were the stars of heaven. Six broad waters. Five tumblers on a board, And four gospel writers. Three three divers (?) Two two lily white boys And they were clothed in green, O. One is one and all alone, And ever more shall be so. The correspondent added "It was sung in a monotone.") By 1868 several variant and somewhat garbled versions were being sung by street children as Christmas carols. Sharp states that the song was very common in Somerset and the whole of the West of England.

"Green grow the rushes, Ho" (or "O"), the chorus, is not included in Sharp's version, which has simply the call and refrain "Come and I will sing to you. What will you sing to me? I will sing you one-er-y. What is your one-er-y? One is One ..." However, Sharp records that "a form of this song, 'Green grow the rushes, O' is known at Eton", that it was printed in English County Songs, and that Arthur Sullivan had included a version in the Savoy opera The Yeomen of the Guard. Sharp discusses at length the similar Hebrew song "Echad Mi Yodea" (Who Knows One?), which accumulates up to thirteen and is sung at many Jewish Passover seders. (Note: The Hebrew song has "Who knoweth 13? I, saith Israel, know 13: 13 divine attributes, 12 tribes, 11 stars, 10 commandments, 9 months preceding childbirth, 8 days preceding circumcision, 7 days in the week, 6 books of the Mishnah, 5 books of the law, 4 matrons, 3 patriarchs, 2 tables of the covenant; but One is our God, who is over the heavens and the earth.")

== Interpretation ==
The twelve stanzas may be interpreted as follows:

Twelve for the twelve Apostles

This refers to the twelve Apostles of Jesus. Sharp states that there were no variants of this line.

Eleven for the eleven who went to heaven

These are the eleven Apostles who remained faithful (minus Judas Iscariot), or possibly St Ursula and her 11,000 companions.

Ten for the ten commandments

This refers to the Ten Commandments given to Moses.

Nine for the nine bright shiners

The nine may be an astronomical reference: the Sun, Moon and five planets known before 1781 yields seven and to this may be added the sphere of the fixed stars and the Empyrean, or it may refer to the nine orders of angels. Sharp records no variants in Somerset, but that Sabine Baring-Gould found a Devon variant "The nine delights" which Sharp glosses as "the joys of Mary".

Eight for the April Rainers

Refers to the Hyades star cluster, called the "rainy Hyades" in classical times, and rising with the sun in April; the Greeks thought of the Hyades as inaugurating the April rains.

Seven for the seven stars in the sky

The seven are probably the Seven Sisters, the Pleiades star cluster. Other options include Ursa Major, or the seven traditional planets. Alternatively, they could be the seven stars of Revelation chapter 1, verse 16, which are held in the right hand of Christ and explained as referring to the seven angels of seven of the early Christian churches.

Six for the six proud walkers

This may be a corruption of 'six proud waters', a reference to the six jars of water that Jesus turned into wine at the wedding feast at Cana of Galilee, (John 2:6) which Sharp notes was suggested by the editors of English County Songs. Or it may refer to Ezekiel 9:2 where six men with swords come in a vision of the prophet to slaughter the people, whose leaders (8:16) have committed such sins as turning East to worship the Sun, and "have filled the land with violence".

Five for the symbols at your door

May refer to the marks of blood that God commanded the Israelites to put upon their doorways at the Exodus (cf Exodus 12:7). It may also allude to the practice of putting a pentagram at the door of a house to ward off witches and evil spirits in the late Middle Ages and the Early Modern period, and is alluded to in literary works. John Timpson's book Timpson's England states that it refers to five symbols displayed above the doorways of houses that would shelter Catholic priests. He gives an example of a house where these can still be seen. (Note: Sharp records unexplained variants "the boys upon the pole", "the thimble over the ball", "the plum boys at the bowl" and "the plum boys in the brow".)

Four for the Gospel makers (Note: Or Gospel writers)

This refers to the four Evangelists, Matthew, Mark, Luke, and John.

Three, three, the rivals

'Rivals' may be a corruption of Riders, Arrivals, or Wisers, referring to the three Magi of the Nativity. The suggestion of the Trinity leaves the rivals unexplained. Perhaps it is not intended to mean 'three competitors' but rather, the 4th century rival philosophical controversies about the trinitarianism: The nature of God as three entities? The rivalry was about which wording could be accepted by a majority, and so would become established as part of the orthodox Christian creed. Another possibility is the trio of Peter, James, and John, often mentioned together in the Gospels, who had a dispute "among them as to which of them was considered to be greatest" (Luke 22:24).

Two, two, the lily-white boys
Clothed all in green, Ho (Note: Or Clothe them all in green, Oh)

Many traditions hold that John the Baptist, like Jesus, was born without original sin, making them the lily-white boys. "The infant [John the Baptist] leaped in her [Elizabeth's] womb" (Luke 1:41).

This may refer to the story of the Transfiguration of Jesus where Moses and Elijah appear with Jesus in clothes of 'dazzling white'. The dressed in green would then refer to St. Peter's suggestion that the disciples build shelters of branches for Moses, Elijah, and Jesus. Robert Graves suggested that the reference is the defeat at Yule of Holly King by the Oak King.

Sharp cites Baring-Gould's suggestion of an astronomical mnemonic, the Gemini twins (Castor and Pollux) or "signs for Spring". In support of this, Gemini is the northernmost constellation in the zodiac, therefore high in the winter sky in the northern hemisphere where the aurora borealis on occasion clothes the heavenly twins in green.

Another explanation is that the statues of St. John and St. Mary which, in traditionally configured Anglican and Roman Catholic churches, flank the crucifix on the altar reredos or the rood screen were bound with rushes to cover them, during Holy Week. (Note: During Holy Week, from Palm Sunday until Easter Day, all statues, crosses, and crucifixes are traditionally covered from view, and all flowers are removed from the Church.) The two figures were portrayed in similar garments, hence lily-white [boys], and wrapped in rushes they were clothed all in green. Except that they weren't boys.

There is an alternate version:

Two, two, the lily white pair, clothen all in green, Ho

which may refer to Adam and Eve.

W.W. Reade implied that the stanza refers to ovates, who performed sacrifices for the druids. Normally they would be dressed in white, but their sacerdotal robes would be green. According to the writer and folklorist Tom Slemen, such practices were still being performed in secret in the last century, by a cult known as "The Lily White Boys" in the North West of England.

One is one and all alone (Note: Alternates: One is one and one alone or One is one and stands alone.)

This appears to refer to God.

== Variants ==
Apart from the Notes and Queries and the Hebrew versions already mentioned, the following variants are known.

=== The Twelve Apostles ===
A variant, sung in the American Ozarks, is entitled The Twelve Apostles. Its twelfth, cumulated, verse, is:

Come an' I will sing!
What will you sing?
I will sing of twelve.
What of the twelve?
Twelve of the twelve apostles,
Leven of the saints that has gone to Heaven,
Ten of the ten commandments,
Nine of the sunshines bright an' fair,
Eight of the eight archangels,
Seven of the seven stars in the sky,
Six of the cheerful waiters,
Five of the ferrymen in the boat,
Four of the gospel preachers,
Three of them were strangers,
Two of the little white babes
Dressed in the mournin' green.

=== The Dilly Song ===
A similar variant is found in Winston Graham's The Twisted Sword (1990), the penultimate book in the Poldark series. It is sung by a Cornish choir on Christmas Eve. Current 93 recorded a version on their 1988 album Earth Covers Earth. English folksinger Kate Rusby recorded a rendition of "The Dilly Carol" for her 2015 Christmas album The Frost is All Over:

Come and I will sing you
What will you sing O?
I will sing One O.
What is your One O?

Twelve are the Twelve Apostles
Leven are the 'leven will go to Heaven
Ten are the Ten Commandments
Nine is the moonshine bright and clear
Eight are the Eight Archangels
Seven are the Seven Stars in the sky
Six the Cheerful Waiter
Five is the Ferryman in the boat
Four are the Gospel Praychers
Three of them are strangers
Two of them are Lilly-white babes
Clothed all in green-o
One of them is all alone and ever shall remain so.

== Alternative titles ==
- I'll Sing You One Oh
- The Carol of the Twelve Numbers
- The Twelve Apostles
- The Dilly Song
- The Dilly Carol
- The Counting Song
- Come and I Will Sing You
- Stay and I’ll Sing

== Related works ==
- The spiritual "Children, Go Where I Send Thee" has a similar format, counting down from ten or twelve biblical references.
- "Echad Mi Yodea" ("Who Knows One?"), a Hebrew song sung at the end of the Jewish Passover seder, has a very similar structure, counting up to thirteen using biblical and religious references.
- The song "The Ten Commandments", on Figgy Duff's album After The Tempest is a variant, omitting the last two symbols.
- A filk song titled "High Fly the Nazgul-O!" uses the same tune but the lyrics have been changed to refer to The Lord of the Rings.
- The comedy character Rambling Syd Rumpo sang a parody called "Green Grow My Nadgers, O" on the Round the Horne radio comedy programme.
- In the Gilbert & Sullivan opera The Yeomen of the Guard, the duet "I Have a Song to Sing, O" was inspired by a variant of this song, beginning "Come, and I will sing you".
- In The Children of Green Knowe, by Lucy M. Boston, Tolly sings the first two verses of the song.
- In the "Too Many Christmas Trees" episode of the 1960s U.K. TV series The Avengers, Steed sings the first two verses of this song to avoid having his mind influenced by his adversaries with psychic powers.
- The Society for Creative Anachronism kingdom of Ealdormere has a filk version of the song, using the tune and the count-down format; the final line is "And one for the land of Ealdormere that ever more shall be so".
- The Two Ronnies performed a satirical version as members of a Russian Choir. "Green" was changed to "Red". Memorable lyrics included: "Six for the Common Market / Five pence a mile to drive your car / And four pounds just to park it / Three P for a rotten cup of tea / Tu-tu for women's lib / Now they've burned their bras - O! / One is one, and all alone, and that is Greta Garbo".
- "Red Fly the Banners, O" is a Marxist-Leninist version of the song.
- Twelve of Anthea Fraser's novels featuring fictional detective David Webb reference lines of the song.
- The song is sung by Mary Ann "Polly" Nichols preceding her murder in Alan Moore's From Hell. Though there is no record of Nichols knowing the song or being known to sing it, Moore admits in his annotations that he included the song to tie into the book's theme of the pagan symbolism of Britain - as well as it being a song likely to be sung by a citizen of London in the 1800s.
- A variation of this song using nature references and extending only from one to five is performed by an animated turtle in children's TV show Sesame Street.
- Jilly Cooper's novel Rivals references the song several times: the three companies are described as the "three rivals" and lines from the song are sung by characters.
- The Canadian folk rock band Great Big Sea recorded a version titled "Come and I Will Sing You" on their 2005 album The Hard and the Easy.
- Terry Pratchett's novel Hogfather features two brothers that share the last name "Lilywhite"; the book also contains a fictional holiday carol "The Lilywhite Boys".
- The American band R.E.M. wrote a song named "Green Grow the Rushes" that was released in 1985 on their album Fables of the Reconstruction.
- Jonathan Stagge's (pseud. see Patrick Quentin) mystery novel Death's Old Sweet Song (1946) has a series of murders referencing lines of the song.
- Australian writer Garth Nix's Old Kingdom book series incorporates a version of the song, as well as the idea of Nine Bright Shiners, into its cosmology.
- The song is referenced in Shirley Jackson's novel Hangsaman.
- A much-corrupted version of the song appears in Irene Hunt's novel Across Five Aprils, which she cites as having heard from her grandfather.

== See also ==
- List of Christmas carols
