= Disney Magazine =

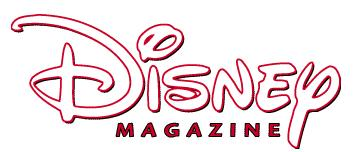

- Cover of the Spring 1997 issue
- Categories: Children, Entertainment, News
- Frequency: Quarterly
- Circulation: Worldwide
- Publisher: The Walt Disney Company
- Founder: The Walt Disney Company
- Founded: December 1965
- First issue: Winter 1965-66 (as Disney News)
- Final issue: Summer 2005 (as Disney Magazine)
- Company: The Walt Disney Company
- Country: United States of America
- Based in: Anaheim, California
- Language: English
- Website: see below
- ISSN: 0262-3463
- OCLC: 31326679

Disney Magazine was an official Disney magazine that was published quarterly from December 1965 to April 2005. The Disney Magazine, otherwise known as Disney News Magazine, was the “Official Magazine for Magic Kingdom Club Families”. The magazine was sent out four times a year, with one edition per season and was free to members of the Magic Kingdom Club (MKC).

== History ==
The magazine began life as Disney News in December 1965. The first issue was 16 pages long, and the cover showed Walt Disney surrounded by several costumed characters in front of Disneyland's Sleeping Beauty Castle. The magazine was initially a free benefit for members of the MKC but later started charging a cover price (discounted for members).

The publication changed its name to The Disney Magazine in March 1994 to better reflect the increased size and content of the magazine. It became simply "Disney Magazine" in the summer 1996 issue.

== The Magic Kingdom Club ==
For people that were a part of the Magic Kingdom Club, they were sent the Disney Magazine for free. This fan-based club, was a way for southern California residents to have a discounted admission price into the park. When Walt Disney World opened in 1971, the program became nationwide, allowing anyone the opportunity for a cheaper admission, as well as added benefits such as vacation packages.

== Bob Baldwin ==
Over his 30 years with The Walt Disney Company, Baldwin held many roles, one of which was the Worldwide Director of the Magic Kingdom Club. From 1978-1994 he ran the MKC, and spent most of his time in Japan and Europe over seeing the production of Disneyland Paris and Disneyland Tokyo.

When he was not running the MKC, Baldwin was also the publisher of Disney Magazine for quite some time.

== The First Issue ==
The very first issue of Disney News was published in the Winter of 1965. The 16 page print contained information on what was going on in the park, dates to visit, ticket prices, and special events for Magic Kingdom Club members.

The cover featured an image of Walt Disney surrounded by his famous characters including Mickey Mouse and Minnie Mouse. The whole gang is gathered in front of Sleeping Beauty’s castle at the Disneyland Resort in California. At the time, this was the only Disney park in the world.

This would turn out to be the only edition of the magazine with Walt on the cover during his lifetime. Walt died on December 15, 1966, due to lung cancer. His death came shortly after the plans for Walt Disney World in Orlando, Florida were announced. The magazine never announced a formal statement on Disney's death.

== End of the Magazine ==
When Disney decided to shut down the MKC in January 2001, the magazine continued, but circulation numbers began dropping.

Publication ended with the Summer 2005 issue. Subscribers were offered subscriptions to either FamilyFun or Disney Adventures, or refunds. The magazine's website said the end was due to an increase of people choosing to find information on the Internet, and thus lack of readership.
