= Animal Games =

Studio album by London
- Released: February 1978
- Recorded: 1977
- Studio: IBC, London
- Genre: Punk rock
- Label: MCA
- Producer: Simon Napier-Bell

London album chronology
Animal Games (1978)	London The Punk Rock Collection (1997)

Singles from Animal Games
- 1. "Everyone's a Winner" Released: May 1977; 2. "Summer of Love" Released: August 1977; 3. "Animal Games" Released: November 1977

Professional ratings
Review scores
Source	Rating
AllMusic	4.5/5 stars

Animal Games is the only album recorded by the original line-up of the British punk band London. Recorded throughout 1977 at the IBC Studios in London, the album was actually released in February 1978 after the group had disbanded. The album contained all the band's singles - "Everyone's A Winner", "Summer of Love" and "Animal Games" although the mix of "Everyone's a Winner" is different from the single version. The catalogue number was MCA MCF 2823. The album was also released on music cassette TC - MCF 2823.

In 1997 Captain Oi! Records released a 'best of London' CD called London The Punk Rock Collection that contains all the tracks to be found on Animal Games. Animal Games was re-released in heavy 220 gram vinyl with full original UK artwork by Malkodiria Records in 2001.

The record was produced by Simon Napier-Bell and engineered by Hugh Jones and Andy Miller. The album sleeve was designed by Chris Townson.

In 2012 the band released a follow-up album to Animal Games called Reboot.

== Track listing/composer ==
Side 1

1. No Time (Riff Regan)
2. Animal Games (Riff Regan, Dave Wight, Jon Moss, Steve Voice)
3. Reaction (Riff Regan & Steve Voice)
4. Everyone's a Winner (Riff Regan)
5. Summer of Love (Riff Regan)

Side 2

1. Us Kids Cold (Riff Regan, Dave Wight, Jon Moss, Steve Voice)
2. Young (Riff Regan)
3. Good Looking Girls (Riff Regan & Steve Voice)
4. Out On The Skids (Riff Regan & Steve Voice)
5. Speed Speed (Riff Regan & Steve Voice)
6. Swinging London (Riff Regan, Dave Wight, Jon Moss, Steve Voice)

== Personnel ==
- Riff Regan - Lead vocals
- Jon Moss - Drums
- Steve Voice - Bass & backing vocals
- Dave Wight - Guitar
