= Tkandz =

Nigerian-British rapper

- Born: Ayotomiwa Akande; June 23, 2006 (age 20); Lagos, Nigeria
- Genres: Hip-hop; British rap; drill
- Occupations: Rapper; singer; songwriter
- Instrument: Vocals
- Works: Singles
- Years active: 2021–present

Ayotomiwa Akande (born June 23, 2006), known professionally as Tkandz, is a Nigerian-British rapper from Essex, who is currently based in London. Akande generated worldwide acclaim with the release of his track "Now or Never" with Cxsper, which went viral on social media and charted in multiple territories.

== Early life ==
Akande was born in Lagos, Nigeria, and moved to the United Kingdom at a young age. He taught himself how to make music on BandLab at the age of 15.

== Career ==
=== Beginning, early singles, and breakthrough (2022–2025) ===
In 2022, Akande released his first song, titled "Rainy Days" with Kes and T'jugga. His second release, "No Sleep", featuring T'jugga and Shiloh Dynasty began to go viral on social media, marking his official breakout single. After his breakout, Akande would continue to release music, finding a resurgence in his career when he released his most-streamed single, titled "Now or Never". The track went viral on TikTok, and would also become Akande's first-ever track to debut on the Billboard Global 200, peaking at number 152. "Now or Never" also entered Spotify's Top 50 daily charts in the UK, Poland, and the Netherlands, among others. Additionally, the professional football club Paris Saint-Germain FC (PSG FC), used the audio in one of their TikTok posts. Lamine Yamal of FC Barcelona also used the audio in his post. Magazine Marie Claire also used the audio in one of their TikTok posts.

=== Singles and Prodigy (2026–present) ===
Entering 2026, it was announced that Akande would be performing at his first Rolling Loud festival in Australia. On 5 February 2026, Tkandz released the remix to his viral track, titled "Now or Never II", which saw a feature from Lil Baby. On 11 February 2026, NME featured the rapper on their The NME 100: Essential Emerging Artists for 2026 list. On 19 March 2026, Tkandz released his track "One Hit Wonder". The track serves as the lead single to his upcoming EP, Prodigy. On 31 March 2026, Rolling Loud announced that Tkandz would be making his debut at Rolling Loud Orlando following his rise to stardom. On May 21, 2026, Akande released his debut EP titled Prodigy.

== Discography ==
=== Charted singles ===
Title	Year	Peak chart positions									
Title	Year	UK	AUT	GER	IRE	NLD	NOR	NZ Hot	SWE	SWI	WW
"Now or Never" (with Cxsper)	2025	28	4	6	42	34	64	8	51	4	108
