= It's Now or Never! =

1991 stage comedy by Miles Tredinnick

It’s Now or Never!
- First Edition UK cover
- Author: Miles Tredinnick
- Language: English
- Genre: stage play
- Publisher: Warner Chappell Plays Ltd
- Publication date: 1991
- Publication place: United Kingdom
- Media type: Print (paperback)
- Pages: 98p.
- ISBN: 978-0-85676-148-5
- OCLC: 26356729

It's Now or Never! is a stage comedy written by Miles Tredinnick. It was published in 1991 by Warner Chappell Plays and first produced at the Queen's Theatre in Hornchurch, England in 1994. It starred Tony Roper and Peter Polycarpou and was produced by Rod Coton and Joe Scott-Parkinson in association with the Queen's Theatre Hornchurch. It was directed by Marina Calderone. The play is a sequel to the author's earlier Laugh? I Nearly Went to Miami!

== Characters & synopsis ==
- Tom Weals - the biggest Elvis Presley fan in the world.
- Alice Martin - Tom's fiancée.
- Keith Clark - plumber and fellow Elvis fan.
- Lydia - works in dry-cleaners.
- Elvis - Keith's neighbour.
- Daphne Wood - a newspaper journalist.
- Inspector Olvera - police officer.

Elvis Presley fanatic Tom and his fiancée Alice arrive in Spain from Colchester in preparation for their long-awaited wedding. Keith Clark, a plumber and fellow Elvis fanatic, has offered them the use of his villa outside Marbella while he is in London, but their arrival has been predated by a sighting by Keith of the real Elvis, alive and hiding out in a nearby villa!

Unbeknownst to Alice, who is not much of an Elvis fan, Keith talks Tom into helping him kidnap Elvis to sell the story to the British tabloid press. Things go according to plan until the victim appears to die in their custody. The ensuing confusion resulting from the attempts to hide their hysteria (and the body) from Alice while convincing The Sunday Insider of their conquest leads to chaos as a variety of ‘Elvises’ appear and disappear and identities change by the moment in this fast-paced and frenetic comedy.

== Bibliography ==
- It's Now or Never! (Josef Weinberger Ltd) ISBN 0-85676-148-6
