= Frankie Howerd =

British actor (1917–1992)

Frankie Howerd OBE
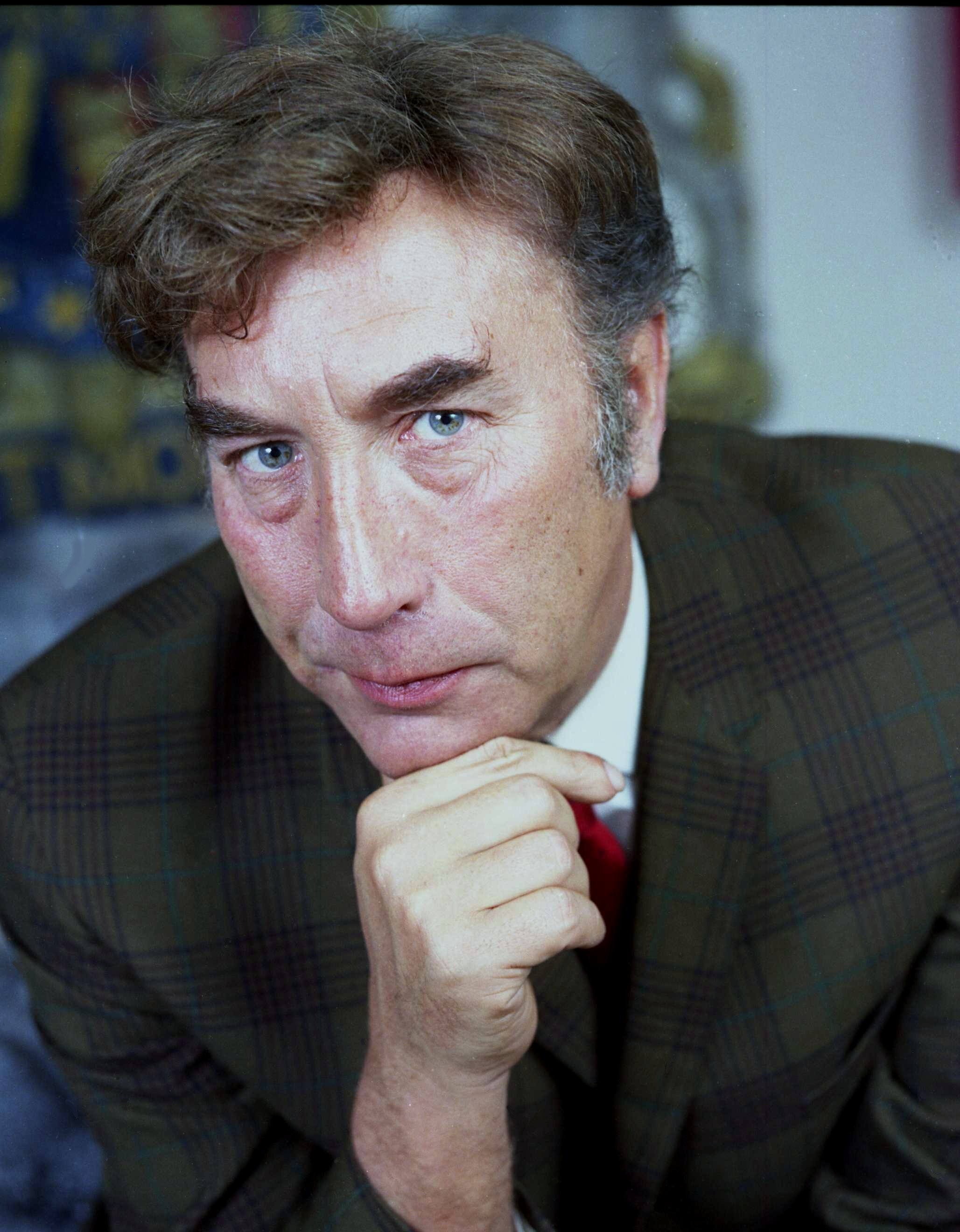
- Portrait by Allan Warren, 1976
- Born: Francis Alick Howard; 6 March 1917; York, England
- Died: 19 April 1992 (aged 75); Fulham, London, England
- Resting place: St. Gregory's Church, Weare, Somerset, England
- Education: Shooters Hill Grammar School
- Occupations: Actor; comedian
- Years active: 1946–1992
- Partner: Dennis Heymer (1958–1992)

Francis Alick Howard (6 March 1917 – 19 April 1992), better known by his stage-name Frankie Howerd, was an English actor and comedian.

== Early life ==
Howerd was born the son of a soldier Francis Alfred William (1887–1934) and Edith Florence Howard (née Morrison, 1888–1962), at the City Hospital in York, England, in 1917 (not 1922 as he later claimed). His mother worked at the Rowntree's factory. The family lived in Hartoft Street, which he later described as "a poorish area of the city near the River Ouse". He retained an affection for his home city, to which he often returned.

When his father was posted to Woolwich, the family moved to Eltham, London while he was a young child, and he was educated at Shooter's Hill Grammar School in Shooter's Hill.

== Career ==
His first stage appearance was at age 13 but his early hopes of becoming a serious actor were dashed when he failed an audition for the Royal Academy of Dramatic Art. He began to entertain during World War II service in the British Army. It was at this time that he adapted his surname to Howerd "to be different". In 1944 he became a bombardier in Plymouth, was promoted to sergeant, and on 6 June 1944 was part of the D-Day effort but was stuck on a boat off Normandy. Despite suffering from stage fright, he continued to work after the war, beginning his professional career in the summer of 1946 in a touring show called For the Fun of It.

His act was soon heard on radio, when he made his debut, in early December 1946, on the BBC's Variety Bandbox programme with a number of other ex-servicemen. His profile rose in the immediate postwar period (aided with material written by Eric Sykes, Galton and Simpson and Johnny Speight). Sykes had headed a rival concert party during the war and was asked by Howerd if he could provide his material; Sykes obliged and offered to write anything more Howerd needed. Sykes punctuated the material with various 'ooh's and 'ahh's to provide "punctuation pauses" in the delivery, but Howerd decided to deliver these verbatim. Howerd then toured the Music Hall circuit with an act including what became his standard catch-phrases such as "titter ye not". He also became a regular in the 1950s editions of the weekly hard-copy comic Film Fun.

In 1954 he made his screen debut opposite Petula Clark in The Runaway Bus, which had been written for his specific comic talent. Filming took five weeks, with a budget of £45,000.

He then experimented with different formats and contexts, including stage farces, Shakespearean comedy roles, and television sitcoms. At the start of the 1960s, he began to recover his old popularity, initially with a season at Peter Cook's satirical Establishment Club in Soho in London. He was boosted further by success on That Was the Week That Was (TW3) in 1963 and on stage with A Funny Thing Happened on the Way to the Forum (1963–1965), which led into regular television work. In 1966 and 1967, he co-hosted a 90-minute Christmas show called The Frankie and Bruce Christmas Show with Bruce Forsyth, featuring many top acts of the day.

During the 1960s and 1970s, he was involved in shows for the BBC and Thames Television (as well as Frankie Howerd Reveals All for Yorkshire Television in 1980). Ray Galton and Alan Simpson wrote for him from 1964 to 1966 when he worked for the BBC and also for a one-off show for Thames, Frankie Howerd meets the Bee Gees, shown on 20 August 1968. He was known for his seemingly off-the-cuff remarks to the audience, especially in the show Up Pompeii! (1969–70), which was a direct follow-up from Forum. His television work was characterised by direct addresses to camera and by his littering monologues with verbal tics such as "Oooh er, missus" and "Titter ye not". A later sale of his scripts, however, showed that the seemingly off-the-cuff remarks had all been meticulously planned. Barry Cryer said of his technique: "What he could do with a script was amazing, like all the great performers. He transformed something you'd just written – what you hoped was in a Frankie Howerd idiom – but when you heard him do it, my God, it was something else; – it was gossiping over the garden wall, the apparent waffle – he was like a tightrope walker, you thought he's going to fall off in a minute, you thought, 'Come on, Frank', we're waiting for a laugh, and then, suddenly, Bang. He knew exactly what he was doing." Another feature of his humour was to feign innocence about his obvious and risqué double entendres, while mockingly censuring the audience for finding them funny.

Howerd appeared as Francis Bigger, one of the lead characters in 1967's Carry On Doctor, of which Variety noted, "Added zest is given by the inclusion of Frankie Howerd as a quack 'mind-over-matter' doctor who becomes a reluctant patient. Howerd's brilliantly droll sense of comedy is given plenty of scope."

The success of the film version of Up Pompeii in 1971 saw British exhibitors vote him the ninth most popular star at the British box office that year. He would play versions of the character Lurcio in Up the Chastity Belt (Lurkalot), also in 1971, and Up the Front (Boot Boy Lurk) in 1972.

In 1971 Howerd recorded, with June Whitfield, a comedy version of the song "Je t'aime", previously recorded by Jane Birkin and Serge Gainsbourg, in which she featured as "Mavis" alongside Howerd's "Frank", and a third unexplained sleeping partner named "Arthur". The song was included in the 2004 CD re-issue of Oh! What a Carry On!.

In 1976, Howerd appeared in The Frankie Howerd Show on CBC Television in Canada. It received good ratings but was not renewed.

In 1978, Howerd appeared in the big-budget Hollywood musical Sgt. Pepper's Lonely Hearts Club Band playing Mean Mr Mustard, acting alongside musical and film talent such as Peter Frampton, the Bee Gees, George Burns, Alice Cooper, Aerosmith and Steve Martin. He was cast by producer Robert Stigwood as he was on Stigwood's record label at the time. The film was a critical and commercial flop. Since Howerd was not well known to American audiences, this may have been his biggest exposure in the US.

There was a cabaret tour of New Zealand in 1979. In 1982, Howerd appeared in the televised versions of Gilbert and Sullivan's Trial by Jury (as the Learned Judge) and H.M.S. Pinafore (as Sir Joseph Porter, KCB). He performed a comedy-duet with Cilla Black on Cilla Black's Christmas (1983).

After six years without a regular television show in the United Kingdom (though he had hosted a one-off UK version of The Gong Show for Channel 4, which was critically panned and was not commissioned for a full series), Howerd returned to TV screens in 1987 in the Channel 4 show Superfrank!, scripted by Miles Tredinnick and Vince Powell. In the last years of his career, Howerd developed a following with student audiences and performed a one-man show at universities and in small theatrical venues. He was also a regular guest on the late night BBC Radio 1 programme Into the Night, hosted by Nicky Campbell.

In 1990, he contributed to the last recording studio collaboration between Alan Parsons and Eric Woolfson, on the album Freudiana, performing "Sects Therapy".

Howerd often worked with Sunny Rogers (1913–2005), who was his accompanying pianist from 1960 onwards. She appeared in his TV and live theatre shows including his last major West End appearance – his one-man show – at the Garrick Theatre in 1990. He also occasionally performed with accompanist Vera Roper (1908–2001), of Southend-on-Sea, who was billed as "Madam Vere-Roper".

== Honours ==
He was appointed OBE in 1977.

== Personal life ==
Throughout his career, Howerd hid his potentially career-destroying homosexuality from both his audience and his mother, Edith. (Sexual acts between consenting males were illegal in England and Wales until 1967.) In 1958, he met sommelier Dennis Heymer at the Dorchester Hotel while dining with Sir John Mills; Howerd was 40 and Heymer was 28. Heymer became his lover as well as manager, and stayed with him for more than thirty years, until Howerd's death, with Heymer helping to revive Howerd's flagging career in the 1960s. However, the two had to remain discreet as Howerd feared being blackmailed if anyone beyond his immediate circle found out. The relationship was explored in 2008 in a drama for BBC Four, Rather You Than Me, starring David Walliams and Rafe Spall.

Backstage, Howerd was notoriously bold in his advances, and was known for his promiscuity. One of Howerd's former boyfriends was comic actor Lee Young who created the TV sitcom Whoops Baghdad (1973) for him. Howerd's uncomfortable relationship with his sexuality – he once allegedly said to Cilla Black, "I wish to God I wasn't gay" – as well as his depressive mental state, led him to seek resolution through a series of different methods. Heymer would often drop Howerd off on Friday at his psychiatrist, who would ply him with LSD over the weekend. This experience was later the subject of the March 2015 BBC Radio 4 drama Frankie Takes a Trip.

In his early career, Howerd suffered from a stutter, which caused him some distress, but which he turned to an advantage in developing his delivery style as a comic.

For the last 20 years of Howerd's life, he and Heymer lived in Wavering Down, a house in the village of Cross, Somerset, under the Mendip Hills. After Howerd's death, Heymer curated Howerd's collection of memorabilia until his own death in 2009.

== Death ==
Having contracted a virus during a Christmas trip to the Amazon in 1991, Howerd suffered respiratory problems at the beginning of April 1992 and was taken to a clinic in London's Harley Street, but was discharged at Easter. He collapsed and died of heart failure two weeks later, on the morning of 19 April 1992, aged 75. Two hours before he died, he was speaking on the telephone to his TV producer about new ideas for his next show.

Howerd's death came one day after that of fellow comedian Benny Hill, but as Hill had died alone at his home, it was not yet known he was dead. Some newspapers ran an obituary of Howerd which featured a quote, ostensibly from Hill, saying that "We were great, great friends". The quote was released by Dennis Kirkland, a friend of Hill who acted as his press agent; Kirkland had issued the statement himself after being unable to contact Hill.

Howerd was buried at St. Gregory's Church in Weare, Somerset. In May 2009, when Heymer died, he was buried near him.

== Legacy ==
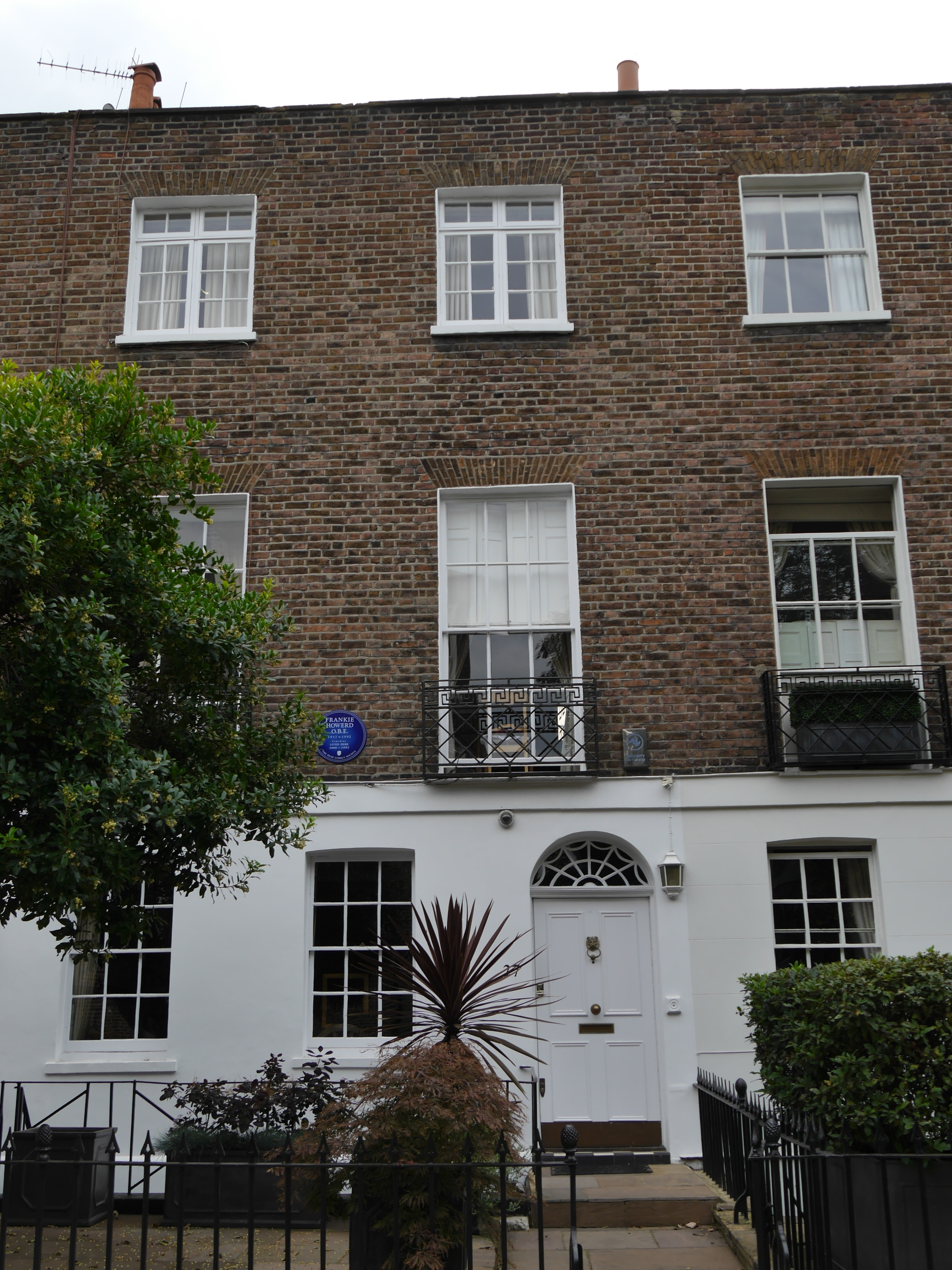
27 Edwardes Square, London

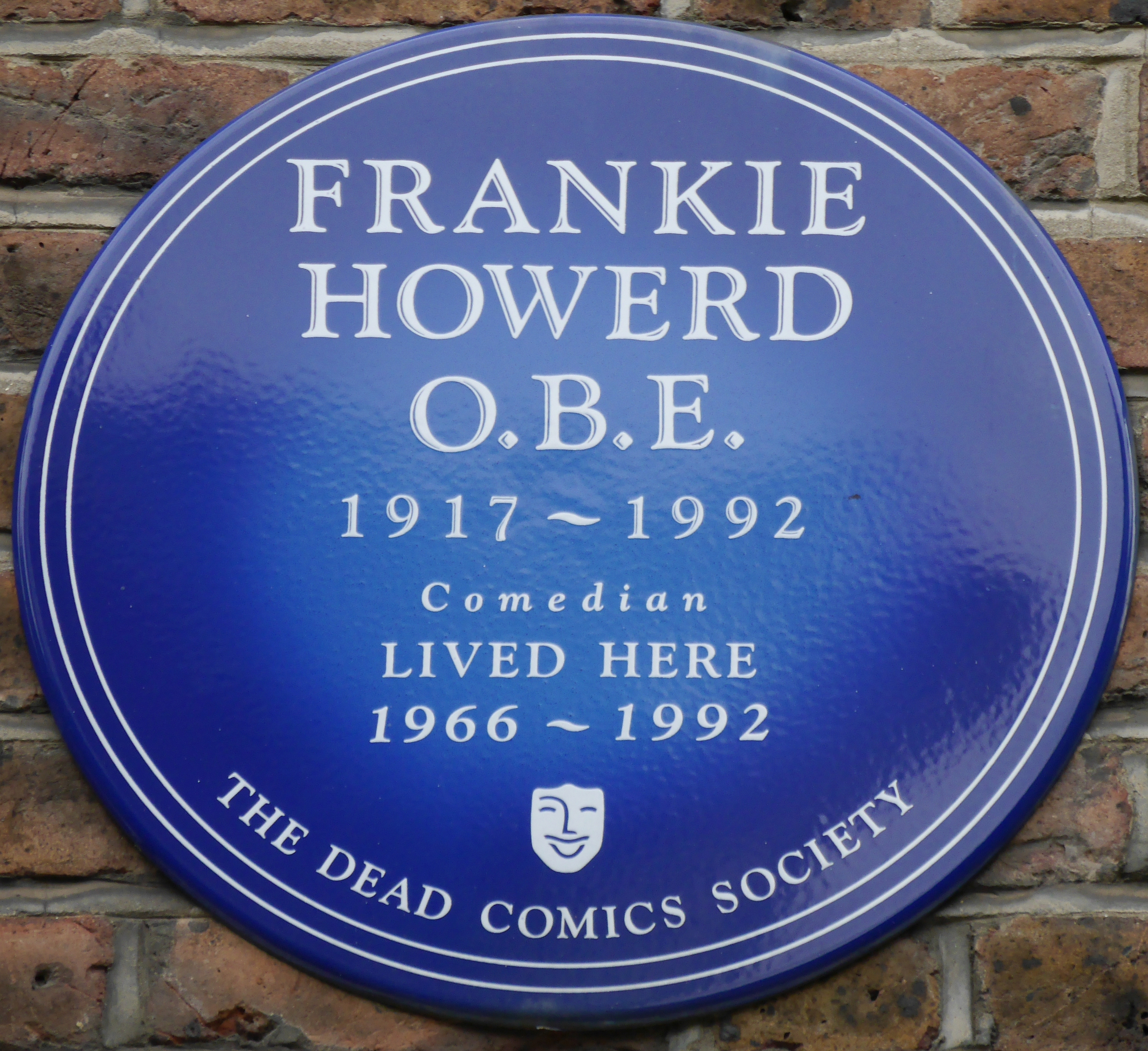
Blue plaque at Edwardes Square, London

A BBC TV biography about Frankie Howerd, Rather You Than Me, was broadcast by BBC Four on 9 April 2008, and repeated on 10 February 2013. The script was written by Peter Harness, after extensive interviews with Howerd's partner, Dennis Heymer. The comedian David Walliams was cast as Howerd.

On 15 May 2009, Heymer died in the home, Wavering Down, that he and Howerd had shared. He was 79. Wavering Down is now a tourist attraction and, in the summer, hosts concerts and opens regularly as a museum of Howerd's collection of memorabilia and personal effects such as his false teeth and ill-fitting toupee, to raise funds for charity.

Howerd also lived at 27 Edwardes Square, Kensington, London W8. The house bears a blue plaque installed by the Dead Comics' Society in 1993. In March 1999 former colleagues and friends and Howerd's sister Betty attended a fund-raising weekend in York and a blue plaque was placed on the Cumberland Street entrance to the Grand Opera House. The inscription reads: "Frankie Howerd OBE 1917-1992. Son of York". In 2016, a York Civic Trust plaque was unveiled at 53, Hartoft Street, Howerd's childhood home, by York-born actor Mark Addy and the Lord Mayor of York.

The church hall of St Barnabas Church, Eltham, was re-named the Frankie Howerd Centre in the 1980s and was opened by Howerd himself.

Howerd's career was described by the comedian Barry Cryer as being "a series of comebacks".

== Works ==
=== Recordings ===
==== Singles ====
- "Three Little Fishies" (1949), Harmony A1001, acc. by Billy Ternent and His Orchestra
- "English As She Is Spoken"/"I'm The Man Who's Deputising for the Bull" (1952), Columbia Records, written by Eric Sykes, acc. by Billy Ternent and His Orchestra
- "All's Going Well"/"Nymphs and Shepherds" (1953), Philips Records PB214, with Margaret Rutherford
- "Up Je t'aime" (1971), with June Whitfield

==== Albums ====
- At The Establishment and at the BBC (1963, Decca, scripted by Barry Took and Marty Feldman)
- Please Yourselves (1976, Polydor, scripted by David Nobbs and David McKellar)

=== Radio ===
Sources:

- Variety Bandbox (1946-1950 as guest/resident comedian, 28 Sep 1952 very special guest for final edition)
- Fine Goings On (1951, 14 Eps, 4 Jan to 5 Jul)
- Frankie Howerd Goes East (1952, 8 Eps, 23 Apr to 11 Jun)
- The Frankie Howerd Show (1953, 16 Eps, 23 Nov to 8 Mar)
- Now Listen! (1954, 6 Eps, 27 Aug to 8 Oct)
- The Frankie Howerd Show (1954, Special from Earls Court, 30 Aug)
- The Frankie Howerd Show (1955, 8 Eps, 22 Mar to 12 Apr)
- The Frankie Howerd Show (1955, 14 Eps, 2 Oct to 22 Jan)
- Frankie Howerd in 'Puss in Gumboots' (1956, 25 Dec)
- Fine Goings On (1958, 20 Eps, 2 Apr to 13 Aug)
- Desert Island Discs (1959, 28 Sep)
- Frankie's Bandbox (1960, 13 Eps, 5 Apr to 28 Jun)
- Frankie Howerd! (1966, 10 Eps, 24 Jul to 25 Sep). Labelled 'The Frankie Howerd Show' in repeats
- The Frankie Howerd Show (1973, 8 Eps, 10 Jun to 22 Jul), with Miss Lyme recording Frankie's memoirs
- The Frankie Howerd Show (1974, 7 Eps, 27 Oct to 8 Dec)
- The Frankie Howerd Show (1975, 6 Eps, 28 Sep to 2 Nov)
- The Frankie Howerd Variety Show (1978, 6 Fortnightly Eps, 10 Oct to 19 Dec)
- Desert Island Discs (1982, 23 Jan)
- Loose Ends Christmas Special: Carry On Up Yer Cinders (1990, 22 Dec), Feat Frankie Howerd

=== Television ===
- Frankly Howerd (1959)
- That Was The Week That Was (1962) – Himself
- The Frankie Howerd Show (1964-1966)
- East of Howerd (1966)
- Howerd's Hour (1968)
- Carry On Christmas (1969) – Robert Browning / Fairy Godmother
- Up Pompeii! (1969–1970) – Lurcio
- Whoops Baghdad (1973) – Ali Oopla
- Further Up Pompeii! (1975) – Lurcio
- The Frankie Howerd Show (1976)
- Up The Convicts (1976) – Jonathan Shirk
- The Howerd Confessions (1976)
- Frankie Howerd Reveals All (1980)
- Frankie Howerd Strikes Again (1981)
- Then Churchill Said to Me (1982)
- The Blunders (1986) – cartoon series voiced by Howerd
- Superfrank! (1987) – Himself
- All Change (1989) – Uncle Bob
- Frankie Howerd on Campus (1990)
- Further Up Pompeii (1991) – Lurcio
- Frankie's On... (1992)

=== Video ===
- Frankie Howerd at His Tittermost (1991) at the Birmingham Hippodrome

=== Selected filmography ===
- The Runaway Bus (1954) – Percy Lamb
- The Ladykillers (1955) – The Barrow Boy
- An Alligator Named Daisy (1955) – M.C. at Alligator Rally (uncredited)
- Jumping for Joy (1956) – Willie Joy
- A Touch of the Sun (1956) – William Darling
- Further Up the Creek (1958) – Bosun
- Watch It, Sailor! (1961) – Church organist (guest appearance)
- The Fast Lady (1962) – Road workman in hole
- The Cool Mikado (1963) – Ko-Ko Flintridge
- The Mouse on the Moon (1963) – Himself
- The Great St. Trinian's Train Robbery (1966) – Alphonse of Monte Carlo / Alfred Askett
- Carry On Doctor (1967) – Francis Bigger
- Carry On Up the Jungle (1970) – Professor Inigo Tinkle
- Up Pompeii (1971) – Lurcio
- Up the Chastity Belt (1971) – Richard / Lurkalot
- Up the Front (1972) – Lurk
- The House in Nightmare Park (1973) – Foster Twelvetrees
- Sgt Peppers Lonely Hearts Club Band (1978) – Mr. Mustard

== Selected bibliography ==
- Howerd, Frankie (1976). On the Way I Lost It. W. H. Allen & Co., ISBN 0-491-01807-X.
- Robert Ross (2001). The Complete Frankie Howerd. Reynolds and Hearn, ISBN 1-903111-08-0.
- Graham McCann (1 October 2004). Frankie Howerd: Stand-Up Comic (illustrated ed.). HarperCollins UK. ISBN 1-84115-310-9.
