= Pentameters Theatre =

Pub theatre in Hampstead, London, England

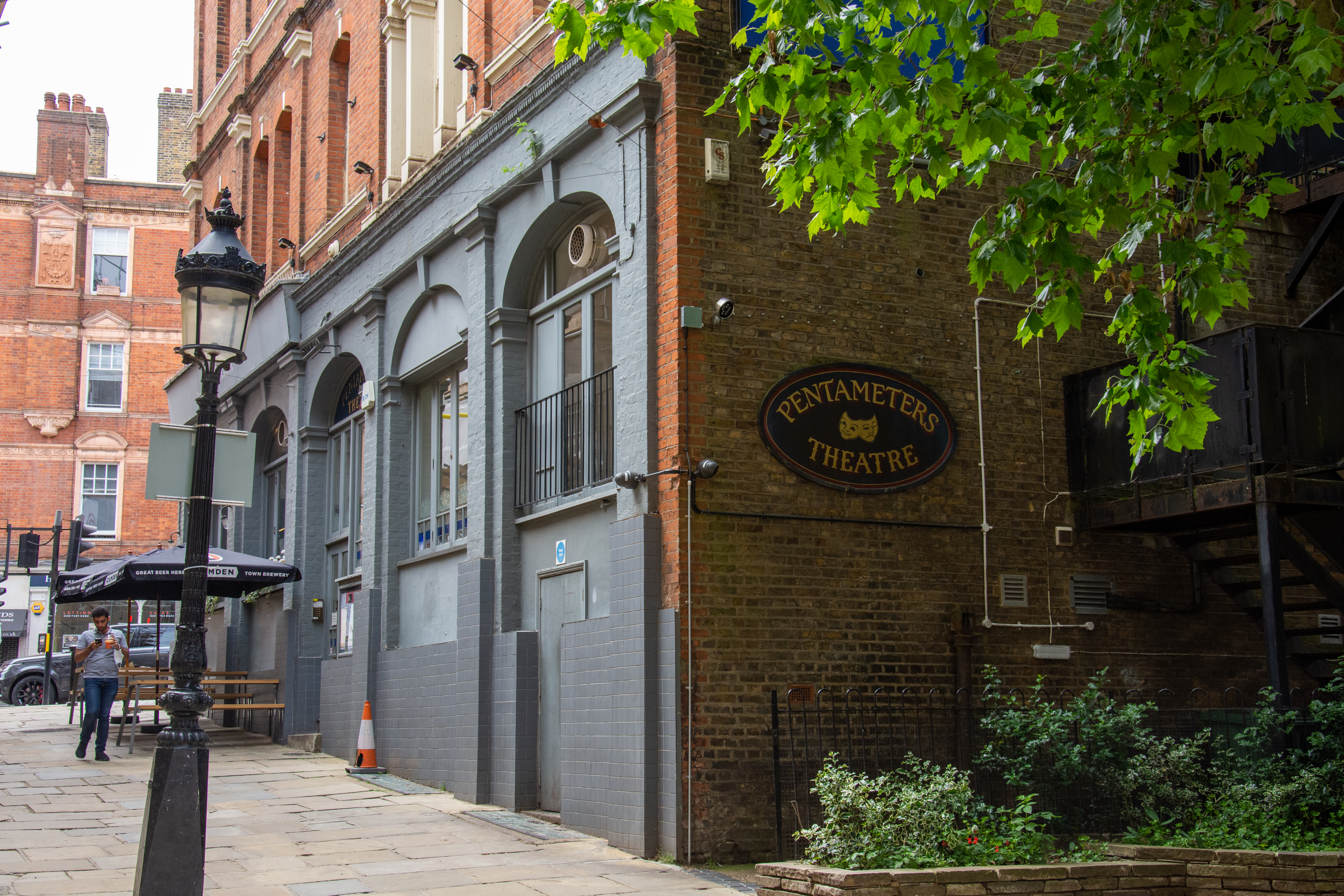
- Interactive map of Pentameters Theatre
- Location: Hampstead; London, NW3; United Kingdom
- Coordinates: 51.555792°N 0.17866°W
- Owner: Léonie Scott-Matthews
- Capacity: 60
- Type: fringe theatre
- Public transit: Hampstead

Construction
- Opened: 1968; 58 years ago

Website
- pentameters.co.uk

The Pentameters Theatre was founded in 1968 and is still run by artistic director Leonie Scott-Matthews, a well known Hampstead resident. Until 2025 it had operated as a 60-seat fringe venue in the London Borough of Camden, located above the Horseshoe public house, in the space now occupied by Circle & Star Theatre.

== History of the theatre ==
The theatre began in a disused skittle alley in the basement of the Freemason's Arms, Hampstead, in August 1968. It moved to an open-air site and also to the Haverstock Arms before moving to The Horseshoe in October 1971. It was founded to present poets reading their work in an informal theatrical pub setting.

== Recent years ==
Scott-Matthews was appointed a BEM in the New Years Honours list 2020 for services to British Theatre and the community in Hampstead. In 2025, The Stage reported that Pentameters Theatre had been evicted from the pub and a new company was being set up in its place by the actor Steve Furst. Pentameters has indicated its intention to continue operating despite the eviction.
