= The Embassy Lark =

- Genre: Sitcom
- Running time: 30 minutes
- Country of origin: United Kingdom
- Language(s): English
- Home station: BBC Light Programme; BBC Radio 2
- Syndicates: BBC Radio 4 Extra
- Starring: Frank Thornton; Derek Francis
- Original release: 15 March 1966 – 11 June 1968
- No. of episodes: 42

The Embassy Lark is a radio comedy series broadcast from 1966 to 1968 as a spin-off from The Navy Lark. It was written by Lawrie Wyman and starred Frank Thornton and Derek Francis. It was produced by Alastair Scott Johnston. Three series, of 13, 14 and 15 episodes, were made.

The show was set in the British Embassy in the fictional country of Tratvia and was concerned with the various (mis)adventures of the British Ambassador Sir Jeremy Crighton-Buller (Francis) and his First Secretary Henry Pettigrew (Thornton) as they tried to keep smooth relations between Tratvia, Whitehall and the other Embassies (China, the USSR and The U.S.). Plots included a sudden requirement to hold a multinational concert in Tratvia with a major hydro-electric contract going to the best entertainment, a boundary dispute over oil fields and numerous examples of the Tratvian authorities attempting to get as much money or services from the Embassy staff as possible. Although written as a broad farce and straight-ahead sitcom, there was thus an undercurrent of xenophobic satire also present. Tratvia was an absolute monarchy, ruled by the fat and greedy, but always very sly, King Hildebrand III. Although never specifically located, Tratvia seems likely to have been a loose parody of the Balkans.

Like all Wyman's comedy, a lot of mileage was gained from peculiar accents, with the other Ambassadors being the most frequent target. Unlike later spin-off The Big Business Lark, there was a crossover between this and the parent series with Francis appearing in both series and Leslie Phillips making an appearance in his Navy Lark character of "silly ass" Sub-Lieutenant Phillips in the spin-off. Also in one episode, HMS Troutbridge visits Tratvia with Ronnie Barker as Commander Bell and Able Seaman Johnson, Stephen Murray as Lt Murray and Lawrie Wyman as Tiddy all reprising characters from The Navy Lark though there were no other characters from the previous series in the show. Richard Caldicot and Heather Chasen also both appeared in separate episodes though not as their Navy Lark characters.

Off-air recordings of all 42 episodes have survived and are readily available from Old Time Radio sites and newsgroups. Occasional repeats have turned up on BBC Radio 4 Extra.

The episode "National Grumpschnog Week" has been released as an extra on the BBC's "Navy Lark Series 8" compendium of CDs.

== Episodes ==
None of these episodes originally had titles. These titles are taken from the episode listings in the booklets for The Navy Lark CD sets.

=== Series 1 (1966) ===
Broadcast on Tuesdays at 7:31pm in the Light Programme.

| No. overall | No. in series | Title | Original release date | Recording date |
|---|---|---|---|---|
| 1 | 1 | "The New Abassador" | 15 March 1966 | 13 June 1965 |
| 2 | 2 | "Overseas Economy" | 22 March 1966 | 5 December 1965 |
| 3 | 3 | "Security" | 29 March 1966 | 12 December 1965 |
| 4 | 4 | "The Princess" | 5 April 1966 | 19 December 1965 |
| 5 | 5 | "National Grumpshnog Week" | 12 April 1966 | 2 January 1966 |
HMS Troutbridge visits Tratvia with Ronnie Barker as Commander Bell and Able Seaman Johnson, Stephen Murray as Lt Murray and Lawrie Wyman as Tiddy
| 6 | 6 | "A Trip to London" | 19 April 1966 | 9 January 1966 |
| 7 | 7 | "The Spy" | 26 April 1966 | 16 January 1966 |
| 8 | 8 | "The Tratvian Jails" | 3 May 1966 | 23 January 1966 |
| 9 | 9 | "The Tratvian State Casino" | 10 May 1966 | 30 January 1966 |
| 10 | 10 | "The Hydro-Electric Scheme" | 17 May 1966 | 6 February 1966 |
| 11 | 11 | "The Party" | 24 May 1966 | 13 February 1966 |
| 12 | 12 | "Mr Pettigrew's Promotion" | 31 May 1966 | 20 February 1966 |
| 13 | 13 | "The Turkish Ambassador" | 7 June 1966 | 27 February 1966 |

=== Series 2 (1967) ===
Broadcast on Tuesdays at 9:00pm in the Light Programme, except for episodes 10-14, which were broadcast at 8:45pm.

| No. overall | No. in series | Title | Original release date | Recording date |
|---|---|---|---|---|
| 14 | 1 | "The Grand Order" | 17 January 1967 | 9 October 1966 |
| 15 | 2 | "The Wine Festival" | 24 January 1967 | 9 October 1966 |
| 16 | 3 | "Economic Problems" | 31 January 1967 | 16 October 1966 |
| 17 | 4 | "The Birthday Surprise" | 7 February 1967 | 16 October 1966 |
| 18 | 5 | "A Parking Problem" | 14 February 1967 | 23 October 1966 |
| 19 | 6 | "Tania Nostrova" | 21 February 1967 | 23 October 1966 |
| 20 | 7 | "The Oil Rig" | 28 February 1967 | 30 October 1966 |
| 21 | 8 | "The Launching" | 7 March 1967 | 30 October 1966 |
| 22 | 9 | "The Missing Document" | 14 March 1967 | 6 November 1966 |
| 23 | 10 | "Students' Exchange" | 21 March 1967 | 6 November 1966 |
| 24 | 11 | "The French Ambassador" | 28 March 1967 | 20 November 1966 |
| 25 | 12 | "Power Cuts" | 4 April 1967 | 20 November 1966 |
| 26 | 13 | "The Comprehensive School" | 11 April 1967 | 11 December 1966 |
| 27 | 14 | "The Weekend" | 18 April 1967 | 11 December 1966 |

=== Series 3 (1968) ===
Broadcast on Tuesdays at 8:45pm on Radio 1 and Radio 2, except for episode three, which was only broadcast on Radio 2.

| No. overall | No. in series | Title | Original release date | Recording date |
|---|---|---|---|---|
| 28 | 1 | "The King's Hostess" | 5 March 1968 | October |
| 29 | 2 | "A Question of Convenience" | 12 March 1968 | October |
| 30 | 3 | "Sir Jeremy Goes on Holiday" | 19 March 1968 | 15 October 1967 |
| 31 | 4 | "Up the Pole" | 26 March 1968 | 22 October 1967 |
| 32 | 5 | "The Leak" | 2 April 1968 | 29 October 1967 |
| 33 | 6 | "The China Figures" | 9 April 1968 | 5 November 1967 |
| 34 | 7 | "Sub Lt Phillips Drops In" | 16 April 1968 | 19 November 1967 |
Featuring Leslie Phillips in his role from The Navy Lark.
| 35 | 8 | "The GNIT Regalia" | 23 April 1968 | 3 December 1967 |
| 36 | 9 | "The Picnic" | 30 April 1968 | 3 December 1967 |
| 37 | 10 | "The Embassy Party" | 7 May 1968 | 10 December 1967 |
| 38 | 11 | "Mr Pettigrew's Life Story" | 14 May 1968 | 10 December 1967 |
| 39 | 12 | "The Temporary British Embassy" | 21 May 1968 | 31 December 1967 |
| 40 | 13 | "An Every Day Story" | 28 May 1968 | 7 January 1967 |
| 41 | 14 | "The Day Off" | 4 June 1968 | 14 January 1967 |
| 42 | 15 | "The Freeze" | 11 June 1968 | 14 January 1967 |
