= Lawrie Wyman =

British scriptwriter (1923–1982)

Lawrence Caulfield Wyman (20 December 1923 – 25 March 1982) was a British comedy scriptwriter.

Born in Brentford, Middlesex, he served in the army during the Second World War. He later became a scriptwriter at the BBC, working with comedians such as Michael Howard and Derek Roy. In the early 1950s he linked up with writer Len Fincham, and co-wrote scripts for Morecambe and Wise, Peter Brough, Peter Jones, Jewel and Warriss, and others.

In 1958, he approached BBC producer Alastair Scott Johnston with an idea for a comedy series using actor Jon Pertwee, based around the exploits of a military unit. This developed into The Navy Lark, one of the most successful comedy series in British radio history, starring Pertwee, Leslie Phillips, and Stephen Murray, and also featuring Ronnie Barker. The series ran through 244 episodes until 1977, with Wyman credited as writer or co-writer throughout, and generated several spin-off series including The Embassy Lark and The Big Business Lark on radio, and HMS Paradise on television.

Soon after the radio series started in 1959, Wyman co-wrote, with Sid Colin, the script for the unsuccessful film The Navy Lark. He also worked with co-writer George Evans on scripts for Bless This House, Love Thy Neighbour and Carry On Dick.

Wyman died in Lambeth, London, in 1982 at the age of 58.
