= The Navy Lark (film) =

1959 British film by Gordon Parry

- Directed by: Gordon Parry
- Written by: Lawrie Wyman; Sid Colin
- Produced by: Herbert Wilcox
- Starring: Cecil Parker; Ronald Shiner; Leslie Phillips
- Cinematography: Gordon Dines
- Edited by: Basil Warren
- Music by: Tommy Reilly
- Distributed by: Twentieth Century-Fox
- Release date: 1959
- Running time: 78 minutes
- Country: United Kingdom
- Language: English

The Navy Lark is a 1959 British comedy film directed by Gordon Parry and starring Cecil Parker, Ronald Shiner and Leslie Phillips, Gordon Jackson and Hattie Jacques. It was based on The Navy Lark radio series broadcast on the BBC Light Programme.

It was one of the last films from Herbert Wilcox.

== Plot ==
Captain Povey has built a reputation for shutting down redundant naval bases, and now has his eye on the minesweeping detachment on Boonsey (a fictional Channel Island, 55 mi (89 km) off Portsmouth). Arriving on inspection, he is told tales of finding many mines in the sea there and, not believing them, goes out in the minesweeper HMS Compton (played by HMS Reedham). The crew were supposed to find "Bessy", a mine-shaped object used to collect Lifeboat funds but found a real mine instead, which Pouter bashes about in an effort to take it apart. Released, it explodes nearby and this convinces Povey that the incompetents there are not up to the job and he decides on using a competent crew to do the job.

Chief Petty Officer Banyard uses his "Pullson's Fulminator Mark III" trick (it does not exist) to delay their decommissioning and what started off as a thin folder goes around the military offices and comes back to Povey's office as a mountain of paper work. He sees through it and goes back to the island only to be told there has been an outbreak of "Yellow Fever" there. He is taken in and leaves but decides to return and the trick is revealed as life is back to normal there. Now more than ever he is determined to shut them all down.

Gaston Higgins, a Frenchman, owns the local bar and when he gets drunk he talks of revolution and kicking the British off the island. They decide to use him and say they are under siege from revolutionaries. Povey knows this is another trick and officially gives them three days to leave the island, but his bosses and the government believe the story when they get reports from a reporter, Lieutenant Binns, who was sent there to take photographs. Questions are asked by the British and French governments and Povey's career is on the line as he is told to sort this out as the British do not run from the French.

Povey goes to the island and a fake attack on Gaston and his men is launched but Povey finds out it was all a hoax. Ready to hand out courts-martial all round, Povey is confronted with a picture Binns took of him leading an all-out attack on what is now known to be a hoax, which will be front-page news across the world tomorrow. Stanton talks him into seeing sense and Povey, with his career in tatters if it gets out, tears up his report. He leaves and life goes back to normal on the island. On the way back to Portsmouth, their boat hits another real sea mine and Povey, Binns and the others are left to swim back to base.

== Cast ==
- Cecil Parker as Commander Stanton
- Ronald Shiner as Chief Petty Officer Banyard
- Leslie Phillips as Lieutenant Pouter
- Elvi Hale as Leading WREN Heather Stark
- Nicholas Phipps as Captain Povey
- Cardew Robinson as Lieutenant Binns
- Gordon Jackson as Leading Seaman Johnson
- Harold Kasket as Gaston Higgins
- Hattie Jacques as fortune teller
- Reginald Beckwith as CNI
- Kenneth J. Warren as Brown
- Wanda Ventham as Mabel
- Richard Coleman as Lieutenant Bates
- Llewellyn Rees as Admiral Troutbridge
- Clive Morton as Rear Admiral
- Gordon Harris as Group Captain
- Van Boolen as Fred
- Gordon Whiting as Commander
- Tom Gill as Naval Commander
- Walter Hudd as Naval Captain

== Production ==
It was filmed mainly at West Bay, Bridport, Dorset. The film was produced at Walton-on-Thames.

Only Phillips had appeared on the radio version – all other parts were recast.

The character name Admiral Troutbridge is a nod to the radio series where the ship is called HMS Troutbridge, the ship being named after the Admiral.

== Relationship to radio series ==
According to Jon Pertwee's co-written memoir, published shortly after his death in 1996, the film was also supposed to star Pertwee and Dennis Price, both of whom were key members of the cast in the original radio series. However, according to Pertwee this did not happen as the film's producer Herbert Wilcox refused to employ Price "because he was gay." Pertwee stated that he was among those who objected to Price not being in the film and believed that this contributed to his own replacement in the cast by Shiner. Pertwee noted that the film "bombed" and believed that this was due to the fact that audiences did not consider the film to be The Navy Lark due to the absence of himself, Price and fellow radio series cast member Stephen Murray. A nod to the radio series appears during the fake revolution in the news headlines of The Daily Telegraph referring to "Admiral Troutbridge". The plot has similarities to the episode "The Multiple Mines" (Series 1, Episode 9).

== Critical reception ==
The Monthly Film Bulletin wrote: "The usual farcical situations are tamely explored; there are the usual weary jokes ('How did you get through Dartmouth? – I turned left at Lyme Regis.'); and a marked absence of gusto makes the transition from half-hour radio programme to feature-length film seem a rather wearisome business."

Kinematograph Weekly said it "made a splash".
