= List of The Navy Lark episodes =

This is a list of episodes of the BBC Radio comedy The Navy Lark. Also listed are episodes of The TV Lark which replaced The Navy Lark with the same cast of characters, before being replaced itself by the fifth series of The Navy Lark. All episodes were written by Laurie Wyman, except for series 12-15 which were written by Laurie Wyman and George Evans, and produced by Alastair Scott Johnston unless otherwise indicated.

These episodes originally did not have titles. Titles here are taken from the series box sets and the 60th Anniversary collection. Alternate titles from repeat listings are included when applicable.

As of 2023, one episode is missing from the BBC archives: The TV Lark episode 9, "The Top Secret Rocket Trials".

== Series overview ==
Series	Episodes	Originally released			Timeslot
Series	Episodes	First released	Last released	Network	Timeslot
1	16	29 March 1959	12 July 1959	Light Programme	Sunday 7:00 pm
2	26	16 October 1959	8 April 1960	Light Programme	Friday 7:30 pm
3	20	2 November 1960	15 March 1961	Light Programme	Wednesday 7:31 pm
4	26	15 September 1961	9 March 1962	Light Programme	Wednesday 7:31 pm
S	1	25 December 1962		Overseas Service	TBC
TV	10	25 January 1963	29 March 1963	Light Programme	Friday 8:00 pm
5	6	5 April 1963	10 May 1963	Light Programme	Friday 8:00 pm
6	19	27 September 1963	31 January 1964	Light Programme	Friday 8:00 pm
7	13	11 July 1965	3 October 1965	Light Programme	Sunday 2:00 pm
S	1	25 December 1965		World Service	TBC
8	13	4 September 1966	27 November 1966	Light Programme	Sunday 1:30 pm
9	20	2 July 1967	12 November 1967	Light Programme (1–13); Radio 2 (14–20)	Sunday 1:30 pm (1–13); Sunday 2:00 pm (14–20)
10	18	13 October 1968	9 February 1969	Radio 2	Sunday 2:00 pm
11	16	28 December 1969	12 April 1970	Radio 2	Sunday 2:00 pm (1–14); Sunday 2:01 pm (15–16)
12	10	16 May 1971	18 July 1971	Radio 2	Sunday 2:01 pm
13	13	26 March 1972	18 June 1972	Radio 2	Sunday 2:02 pm
14	13	29 July 1973	21 October 1973	Radio 2	Sunday 2:02 pm
15	11	9 November 1975	18 January 1976	Radio 2	Sunday 2:02 pm
S	1	16 July 1977		Radio 2	Sunday 2:02 pm
S	1	14 November 1992		Radio 2	Saturday 7:30 pm

== Episodes ==
=== Series 1 (1959) ===
No. overall	No. in series	Title	Original release date	Recording date
1	1	"The Missing Jeep"	29 March 1959	22 March 1959
2	2	"Operation Fag End"	5 April 1959	7 January 1959
This was the pilot episode.
3	3	"Number One's Chair"	12 April 1959	15 March 1959
4	4	"The Fairground Lights"	19 April 1959	29 March 1959
5	5	"The Comfort Fund"	26 April 1959	5 April 1959
6	6	"Stuck Up the Inlet"	3 May 1959	12 April 1959
7	7	"The Admiral's Party"	10 May 1959	19 April 1959
8	8	"The Hank of Heather"	17 May 1959	26 April 1959
9	9	"The Multiple Mines"	24 May 1959	17 May 1959
10	10	"The Gun Mechanism Test"	31 May 1959	24 May 1959
11	11	"The Whittlesea Bay Yacht Regatta"	7 June 1959	31 May 1959
12	12	"The Psychology Test"	14 June 1959	7 June 1959
13	13	"A Watch on the Initiative Test"	21 June 1959	14 June 1959
14	14	"An Exercise in Filming"	28 June 1959	21 June 1959
15	15	"The Smuggling Spy"	5 July 1959	28 June 1959
16	16	"The Whittlesea Carnival and Fete"	12 July 1959	28 June 1959

=== Series 2 (1959–60) ===
No. overall	No. in series	Title	Original release date	Recording date
17	1	"New at the Helm"	16 October 1959	4 October 1959
18	2	"Fatso's Box Brownie"	23 October 1959	11 October 1959
19	3	"Bringing Back the Barge"	30 October 1959	18 October 1959
20	4	"The Mock Action"	6 November 1959	25 October 1959
21	5	"Going Dutch"	13 November 1959	1 November 1959
22	6	"The Figurehead"	20 November 1959	8 November 1959
23	7	"Gunboat to Goomba"	27 November 1959	15 November 1959
Episode released in The Navy Lark Collection: Series 12
24	8	"Johnson Finds Treasure"	4 December 1959	22 November 1959
25	9	"The Charter Trip to Antarctica"	11 December 1959	29 November 1959
26	10	"Cementing Relations"	18 December 1959	6 December 1959
27	11	"Strike Up the Band"	25 December 1959	13 December 1959
28	12	"The Route March"	1 January 1960	20 December 1959
Episode released in The Navy Lark Collection: Series 7.
29	13	"The Trip Up the Thames"	15 January 1960	10 January 1960
30	14	"The Radar Talk-Down System"	15 January 1960	10 January 1960
Episode released in The Navy Lark Collection: Series 12.
31	15	"A Crisp Romance"	22 January 1960	17 January 1960
32	16	"The Lighthouse Lark"	29 January 1960	24 January 1960
33	17	"Pertwee Posted to Portsmouth"	5 February 1960	31 January 1960
34	18	"Johnson's Diet"	12 February 1960	7 February 1960
35	19	"Tug-of-War"	19 February 1960	14 February 1960
36	20	"Return to Portarneyland"	26 February 1960	21 February 1960
Episode available as part of The Navy Lark: 60th Anniversary Special Edition release from Audible & ITunes as a bonus download with the download-only version (not included on the CD-version).
37	21	"The Cross Country Run"	4 March 1960	28 February 1960
38	22	"The Morning After"	11 March 1960	6 March 1960
39	23	"The Admiral's Present"	18 March 1960	13 March 1960
40	24	"Secret Mission to Calais"	25 March 1960	20 March 1960
41	25	"Mr Murray Goes Sick"	1 April 1960	27 March 1960
42	26	"The Portarneyland Fishing Limit"	8 April 1960	27 March 1960

=== Series 3 (1960–61) ===
No. overall	No. in series	Title	Original release date	Recording date
43	1	"In Portsmouth for a Re-Fit"	2 November 1960	9 October 1960
N/A	N/A	"The Wrens' Reunion"	Unaired	5 November 1960
The team took part in a special appearance on stage at the Royal Festival Hall, in the presence of The Queen and The Queen Mother, in celebration of the WRNS 21st anniversary. The 20 minute performance was not broadcast, but a recording survives. Episode released in The Navy Lark Collection: Series 2 Part 2.
44	2	"Refitting Ebenezer Pertwee"	9 November 1960	16 October 1960
45	3	"Sea Trials of the Poppadom"	16 November 1960	23 October 1960
46	4	"Mutiny Aboard Troutbridge"	23 November 1960	30 October 1960
47	5	"The Exploding Biscuits"	30 November 1960	6 November 1960
48	6	"Sir Willoughby Takes Over the Island"	7 December 1960	13 November 1960
49	7	"Mount Rumpus Atoll"	14 December 1960	20 November 1960
50	8	"The 50th Show: Mr Murray's Houseboat"	21 December 1960	27 November 1960
51	9	"Johnson's Birthday"	28 December 1960	4 December 1960
Crew of HMS Troubridge in audience.
52	10	"Povey's Unexpected Leave"	4 January 1961	11 December 1960
53	11	"Families' Day"	11 January 1961	18 December 1960
54	12	"Falmouth Ghost Ship"	18 January 1961	1 January 1961
55	13	"Onabushkan Flu"	25 January 1961	8 January 1961
56	14	"The Efficiency Expert"	1 February 1961	15 January 1961
57	15	"The Floggle Grummit Missile"	8 February 1961	29 January 1961
58	16	"The Hitch-Hiking Counterfeiter"	15 February 1961	29 January 1961
59	17	"Commodore Goldstein"	22 February 1961	19 February 1961
60	18	"Mr Phillips Has Navigation Tuition"	1 March 1961	19 February 1961
61	19	"CPO Pertwee and the Laundry"	8 March 1961	26 February 1961
62	20	"The Surprise Wedding"	15 March 1961	5 March 1961
Episode released in The Navy Lark Collection: Series 6 Part 2

=== Series 4 (1961–62) ===
No. overall	No. in series	Title	Original release date	Recording date
63	1	"Returning from Leave"	15 September 1961	10 September 1961
64	2	"Captain Povey's Spy"	22 September 1961	10 September 1961
65	3	"The Secret of Nessie's Youth"	29 September 1961	17 September 1961
66	4	"The Northampton Hunt Ball"	6 October 1961	17 September 1961
67	5	"Hijacked!"	13 October 1961	24 September 1961
68	6	"Admiral Troutbridge"	20 October 1961	1 October 1961
69	7	"Relatives and Reservations"	27 October 1961	8 October 1961
70	8	"Humgrummits on the High Seas"	3 November 1961	15 October 1961
71	9	"Are Captain and Mrs Povey Married?"	10 November 1961	29 October 1961
72	10	"Cine Cameras at Sea"	17 November 1961	5 November 1961
73	11	"The Civilian Adjustment Course"	24 November 1961	12 November 1961
74	12	"A Hole Lieutenant"	1 December 1961	19 November 1961
75	13	"Spy Catching in Casablanca"	8 December 1961	26 November 1961
76	14	"Mount Pot Erupts"	15 December 1961	5 November 1961
77	15	"Captain Povey's Shop"	22 December 1961	3 December 1961
78	16	"Leading Seaman Goldstein's Party"	29 December 1961	10 December 1961
79	17	"The Invitation"	5 January 1962	17 December 1961
80	18	"The Cornish Exercise"	12 January 1962	31 December 1961
Recording found by Radio Circle over Christmas 2022. Aired on Radio 4 Extra Spring 2023.
81	19	"A Strange Hobby"	19 January 1962	7 January 1962
82	20	"Mr Phillips Gets Engaged"	26 January 1962	14 January 1962
83	21	"The Sinking of the Bubble Car"	2 February 1962	21 January 1962
84	22	"Long Jonathan Pertwee"	9 February 1962	28 January 1962
85	23	"The Admiral's Accident Report"	16 February 1962	4 February 1962
86	24	"Over the Sea to Rosyth"	23 February 1962	11 February 1962
87	25	"The Return of Sir Frederick Flatley"	2 March 1962	18 February 1962
88	26	"The Ship's Concert"	9 March 1962	25 February 1962

=== Christmas special (1962) ===
No. overall	No. in series	Title	Original release date	Recording date
N/A	N/A	"Calling The Antarctic"	25 December 1962	4 December 1962
Not broadcast in the UK. Released on The Navy Lark Collection: Series 4, Vol 2.

=== The TV Lark (1963) ===
Released in The Navy Lark Collection: Series 5.

No. overall	No. in series	Title	Original release date	Recording date
N/A	1	"Opening Night"	25 January 1963	20 January 1963
N/A	2	"The Prestige Show"	1 February 1963	27 January 1963
N/A	3	"Z Ambulances"	8 February 1963	3 February 1963
N/A	4	"House of Commons"	15 February 1963	10 February 1963
N/A	5	"Back to Portsmouth"	22 February 1963	17 February 1963
N/A	6	"On Safari"	1 March 1963	24 February 1963
N/A	7	"Ship Ahoy!"	8 March 1963	3 March 1963
N/A	8	"The Portarneyland Election"	15 March 1963	10 March 1963
N/A	9	"The Top Secret Rocket Trials"	22 March 1963	17 March 1963
Recording missing.
N/A	10	"Back in the Navy"	29 March 1963	24 March 1963
The production team travels to Admiralty Records to film another episode of Ship Ahoy! only to find out they've never left the Navy owing to a scheme by Pertwee. NB: This is the only episode to have different opening and closing theme music.

=== Series 5 (1963) ===
No. overall	No. in series	Title	Original release date	Recording date
89	1	"First Day out of Dock"	5 April 1963	31 March 1963
90	2	"The New Barmaid"	12 April 1963	7 April 1963
91	3	"A Deliberate Bashing"	19 April 1963	14 April 1963
92	4	"Whittlesea Regatta"	26 April 1963	21 April 1963
93	5	"HMS Troutbridge gets a Rocket"	3 May 1963	28 April 1963
94	6	"The Ghost Ship"	10 May 1963	5 May 1963

=== Series 6 (1963–64) ===
No. overall	No. in series	Title	Original release date	Recording date
95	1	"Wren Chasen Returns"	27 September 1963	22 September 1963
96	2	"On the Carpet"	4 October 1963	29 September 1963
97	3	"The Bungalese Spies"	11 October 1963	6 October 1963
98	4	"Troutbridge's Party"	18 October 1963	13 October 1963
99	5	"Rescuing Admirals"	25 October 1963	20 October 1963
100	6	"Demise of the Depth Charges"	1 November 1963	27 October 1963
101	7	"The Struggle for Promotion"	8 November 1963	3 November 1963
102	8	"Navigation by Computer"	15 November 1963	10 November 1963
103	9	"Stormy Weather"	22 November 1963	17 November 1963
104	10	"Chasing the Kepeac"	29 November 1963	24 November 1963
105	11	"The Submerged Island"	6 December 1963	1 December 1963
106	12	"The Sicilian Secret Agent"	13 December 1963	8 December 1963
107	13	"Germany's Troutbridge"	20 December 1963	15 December 1963
108	14	"Confirming Povey's Rank"	27 December 1963	22 December 1963
109	15	"The Calais Dock Strike"	3 January 1964	29 December 1963
110	16	"Johnson's Memoirs"	10 January 1964	5 January 1964
111	17	"The Emperor of Tratvia"	17 January 1964	12 January 1964
112	18	"Open Day"	24 January 1964	19 January 1964
113	19	"Stuck on a Sandbank"	31 January 1964	26 January 1964

=== Series 7 (1965) ===
No. overall	No. in series	Title	Original release date	Recording date
114	1	"Taking Some Liberties"	11 July 1965	22 November 1964
115	2	"Smugglers in the Solent"	18 July 1965	29 November 1964
116	3	"Mr Murray is Victimised"	25 July 1965	6 December 1964
117	4	"The Poveys Move House"	1 August 1965	20 December 1964
118	5	"Captain Povey Reports Sick"	8 August 1965	20 December 1964
119	6	"Admiral Pertwee's Fleet"	15 August 1965	3 January 1965
120	7	"Let Loose With a Chopper"	22 August 1965	10 January 1965
121	8	"Making a Right Pig's Breakfast"	29 August 1965	17 January 1965
122	9	"The Mysterious Pudding Mine"	5 September 1965	24 January 1965
123	10	"The Hovercraft Training Course"	12 September 1965	31 January 1965
124	11	"The Sabotaged Floggle-Toggle Box"	19 September 1965	7 February 1965
125	12	"The Portarneyland Training Exercise"	26 September 1965	21 February 1965
126	13	"Going On Leave to Croydon"	3 October 1965	21 February 1965

=== Christmas special (1965) ===
No. overall	No. in series	Title	Original release date	Recording date
N/A	N/A	"Hitting the Ice Floe"	25 December 1965	TBA
Not broadcast in the UK. Released on The Navy Lark Collection: Series 7.

=== Series 8 (1966) ===
No. overall	No. in series	Title	Original release date	Recording date
127	1	"Where Is Troutbridge?" "Searching for Their Ship"	4 September 1966	1 May 1966
128	2	"The Float a Peddle Fiddle?" "Float-a-Peddling Their Way Through"	11 September 1966	8 May 1966
129	3	"A Sticky Business" "Gumming Up The Works"	18 September 1966	15 May 1966
130	4	"Buoys Will Be Buoys" "Buoying Up"	25 September 1966	22 May 1966
131	5	"Steamship Day"	2 October 1966	29 May 1966
132	6	"Farewell to HMS Varsity"	9 October 1966	5 June 1966
133	7	"The Army Lark"	16 October 1966	12 June 1966
134	8	"Just the Ticket"	23 October 1966	10 July 1966
135	9	"Mr Phillips' Promotion"	30 October 1966	10 July 1966
136	10	"Pertwee and the Tratvian Beer"	6 November 1966	19 June 1966
137	11	"The PM Papa"	13 November 1966	26 June 1966
138	12	"Getting Rid of Pertwee"	20 November 1966	24 July 1966
139	13	"Off to Sea at Last"	27 November 1966	24 July 1966

=== Series 9 (1967) ===
No. overall	No. in series	Title	Original release date	Recording date
140	1	"Back from the Antarctic" "Having Been Towing"	2 July 1967	5 March 1967
141	2	"Fishing off the Faroes"	9 July 1967	5 March 1967
142	3	"A Filthy Ferryboat" "Cleaning Up"	16 July 1967	12 March 1967
143	4	"Jigsaws and Jemmies" "Doing a Disastrical"	23 July 1967	12 March 1967
144	5	"The Naval Review" "Deliberately Abandoned"	30 July 1967	19 March 1967
145	6	"The Curious Caravan Case"	6 August 1967	19 March 1967
146	7	"Frenchmen in J.41"	13 August 1967	2 April 1967
147	8	"The Police Drop In"	20 August 1967	2 April 1967
148	9	"Mr Murray's Endurance Course"	27 August 1967	9 April 1967
149	10	"Women in the Wardroom" "Have Been Redecorating"	3 September 1967	9 April 1967
150	11	"Troutbridge's Silver Jubilee Party" "Celebrating Their Important Anniversary"	10 September 1967	7 May 1967
151	12	"CECIL the Navigation Computer" "Computerising"	17 September 1967	16 April 1967
152	13	"A Russian Rendezvous" "Seeing Red"	24 September 1967	16 April 1967
153	14	"The Bugged and Burgled Beer"	1 October 1967	23 April 1967
154	15	"Picking Up the Poppadom"	8 October 1967	23 April 1967
155	16	"Cuthbert Joins the Navy"	15 October 1967	30 April 1967
156	17	"The Flying Machine" "Frustrating the Spark of Invention"	22 October 1967	30 April 1967
157	18	"When Sub-Lt Phillips Was at Dartmouth" "Doing Some Historical Research"	29 October 1967	7 May 1967
158	19	"A Fishy Business" "Frying Up"	5 November 1967	14 May 1967
159	20	"Troutbridge in Quarantine" "Have Been Painting Pink Spots"	12 November 1967	14 May 1967

=== Series 10 (1968–69) ===
No. overall	No. in series	Title	Original release date	Recording date
160	1	"Troutbridge Electrifies Portsmouth" "Lighting Up"	13 October 1968	6 October 1968
161	2	"The Redundancy Drive"	20 October 1968	13 October 1968
162	3	"The Smugglers Return"	27 October 1968	20 October 1968
163	4	"Commander Trotter Takes Charge"	3 November 1968	20 October 1968
164	5	"The Anti-Submarine Missile"	10 November 1968	3 November 1968
165	6	"Sub-Conductor Phillips" "Accredited"	17 November 1968	10 November 1968
166	7	"The South Kawowan Summit"	24 November 1968	10 November 1968
167	8	"Pertwee's Enlistment Expires" "Avoiding Redundancy"	1 December 1968	17 November 1968
168	9	"Captain Povey Takes Over"	8 December 1968	24 November 1968
169	10	"Sir Willoughby Goes to Kawowa"	15 December 1968	8 December 1968
170	11	"The Padre's Birthday"	22 December 1968	8 December 1968
171	12	"The Portsmouth Kiosk"	29 December 1968	15 December 1968
172	13	"The Radio Beacon"	5 January 1969	22 December 1968
173	14	"Mr Phillips' Wrong Uniform"	12 January 1969	5 January 1969
174	15	"Harold Wilson Reviews the Fleet"	19 January 1969	12 January 1969
175	16	"The Relief of the Weather Ship" "Weathering"	26 January 1969	12 January 1969
176	17	"The Mickey Mouse Toothbrush" "Bunging Up"	2 February 1969	19 January 1969
177	18	"The Brick Smugglers"	9 February 1969	26 January 1969

=== Series 11 (1969–70) ===
No. overall	No. in series	Title	Original release date	Recording date
178	1	"Commander Murray and the Squatters"	28 December 1969	19 October 1969
179	2	"What is the SSE?"	4 January 1970	26 October 1969
180	3	"Pertwee Climbs Up the Promotion Ladder"	11 January 1970	2 November 1969
181	4	"Stranded"	18 January 1970	9 November 1969
182	5	"Sir Willoughby's Party"	25 January 1970	16 November 1969
183	6	"The Fleet Initiative Test"	1 February 1970	30 November 1969
184	7	"CPO Pertwee's Long Service Medal"	8 February 1970	30 November 1969
185	8	"The Phenomenal Pertwee Tug"	15 February 1970	7 December 1969
186	9	"The Security Clampdown"	22 February 1970	14 December 1969
187	10	"The Anniversary and the Washing"	1 March 1970	21 December 1969
188	11	"The Forbodians Hijack Troutbridge"	8 March 1970	15 February 1970
189	12	"Number One Gets Married"	15 March 1970	15 February 1970
190	13	"The Honeymooners Return"	22 March 1970	22 February 1970
191	14	"CPO Pertwee and the Lead Half Crowns"	29 March 1970	22 February 1970
192	15	"Sub-Lt Phillips to Leave for Dartmouth"	5 April 1970	1 March 1970
193	16	"The Mark 31 Radar"	12 April 1970	1 March 1970

- Frank Thornton guest starred as Nathaniel Pertwee in episode 8 in place of Jon Pertwee who was ill.

=== Series 12 (1971) ===
No. overall	No. in series	Title	Original release date	Recording date
194	1	"The Put-a-Horse-out-to-Graze Fund"	16 May 1971	18 April 1971
195	2	"Impressions for Survival"	23 May 1971	18 April 1971
196	3	"The Beard-Growing Race"	30 May 1971	2 May 1971
197	4	"The Mysterious Radio Signals"	6 June 1971	2 May 1971
198	5	"Operation Recovery"	13 June 1971	9 May 1971
199	6	"The Slogan Contest"	20 June 1971	9 May 1971
200	7	"Sir Willoughby at Shanghai"	27 June 1971	16 May 1971
201	8	"Operation Cowes Barge"	4 July 1971	16 May 1971
202	9	"Number One's Anniversary"	11 July 1971	23 May 1971
203	10	"The Loch Ness Monster"	18 July 1971	23 May 1971

=== Series 13 (1972) ===
No. overall	No. in series	Title	Original release date	Recording date
204	1	"The TV Documentary"	26 March 1972	9 January 1972
205	2	"The POW Escape Exercise"	2 April 1972	2 January 1972
206	3	"Number One's Married Quarters"	9 April 1972	16 January 1972
207	4	"The Newhaven-Dieppe Smuggling Run"	16 April 1972	23 January 1972
208	5	"The Bumble Spit Lighthouse Affair"	23 April 1972	30 January 1972
209	6	"The Tonipouhaha Treasure"	30 April 1972	6 February 1972
210	7	"The USA Navigator Swap"	7 May 1972	13 February 1972
211	8	"Son of a Sea Lord"	14 May 1972	20 February 1972
212	9	"Hypnotising Ramona"	21 May 1972	27 February 1972
213	10	"The Master of Sardinia"	28 May 1972	5 March 1972
214	11	"Opportunity Knockers"	4 June 1972	5 March 1972
215	12	"Friday the 13th"	11 June 1972	19 March 1972
216	13	"The New NAAFI"	18 June 1972	19 March 1972

=== Series 14 (1973) ===
No. overall	No. in series	Title	Original release date	Recording date
217	1	"The Montezula Revolution"	29 July 1973	21 January 1973
218	2	"The Island Swordfish"	5 August 1973	14 January 1973
219	3	"Bunged in the Rattle"	12 August 1973	28 January 1973
220	4	"Kangaroo Polka"	19 August 1973	18 February 1973
221	5	"The Digital Isles Go Unstable"	26 August 1973	18 February 1973
222	6	"Egbert Hitches a Ride"	2 September 1973	11 March 1973
223	7	"Povey — An Admiral at Last"	9 September 1973	11 March 1973
224	8	"The Bergholm Horse Trials"	16 September 1973	18 March 1973
225	9	"Captain Povey's Wig"	23 September 1973	18 March 1973
226	10	"The Brain Pill"	30 September 1973	25 March 1973
227	11	"Operation Showcase"	7 October 1973	25 March 1973
228	12	"CPO Pertwee — Yachtmonger"	14 October 1973	1 April 1973
229	13	"The Talpinium Shell"	21 October 1973	8 April 1973

=== Series 15 (1975–76) ===
No. overall	No. in series	Title	Original release date	Recording date
230	1	"Sequel to the Talpinium Shell"	9 November 1975	17 August 1975
231	2	"NANA"	16 November 1975	17 August 1975
232	3	"Helen, The New Wren"	23 November 1975	31 August 1975
233	4	"Relief for Station 150"	30 November 1975	31 August 1975
234	5	"Black is Beautiful"	7 December 1975	14 September 1975
235	6	"Sidney and the Stamp"	14 December 1975	14 September 1975
236	7	"Commander Murray Becomes a Showjumper"	21 December 1975	21 September 1975
237	8	"Horrible Horace"	28 December 1975	28 September 1975
238	9	"Officers and Gents' Lib"	4 January 1976	28 September 1975
239	10	"The Case of the HGM Mark 5"	11 January 1976	5 October 1975
240	11	"Uncle Wilberforce Pertwee"	18 January 1976	5 October 1975

== Silver Jubilee special (1977) ==
No. overall	No. in series	Title	Original release date	Recording date
241	1	"The Jubilee Navy Lark" "The BBC Are Sending the Bill to Buckingham Palace"	16 July 1977	26 June 1977
Released in The Navy Lark Collection: Series 15.

== Reunion special (1992) ==
No. overall	No. in series	Title	Original release date	Recording date
N/A	N/A	"The Troutbridge Reunion" sketch in The Light Entertainment Show	16 November 1992	18 October 1992
Written by George Evans. Produced by Richard Willcox and Dirk Maggs. Released in The Navy Lark Collection: Series 15.

== Retrospective specials ==
=== Left Hand Down a Bit ===
Broadcast 13 May 2006 on BBC Radio 7.

A selection of episodes over 3 hours presented by Leslie Phillips.

Episodes Featured:

- "Operation Fag End" (January 1959)
- "The Hank of Heather" (April 1959)
- "The Lighthouse Lark" (January 1960)
- "A Deliberate Bashing" (April 1963)
- "When Sub-Lt Phillips Was at Dartmouth" (October 1967)
- "The Jubilee Navy Lark" (July 1977)

The Leslie Philips links were released on The Navy Lark Collection: Series 10.

=== The Reunion ===
Broadcast 31 August 2008 10:15 am on BBC Radio 4.

Sue MacGregor presents the series which reunites a group of people intimately involved in a moment of modern history. She brings together some of the original team behind The Navy Lark. Participants included June Whitfield, Leslie Phillips, George Evans, Heather Chasen and Tenniel Evans.
