= The Culture Vultures =

- Genre: Sitcom
- Written by: Colin Mares; Tim Brooke-Taylor; David Climie
- Starring: Leslie Phillips, Jonathan Cecil, Peter Sallis, Sally Faulkner
- Country of origin: United Kingdom
- No. of series: 1
- No. of episodes: 5

Production
- Producer: Graeme Muir
- Running time: 30 minutes

Original release
- Network: BBC1
- Release: 24 April – 22 May 1970

The Culture Vultures is a British sitcom that aired on BBC1 in 1970. The series starred Leslie Phillips as a university lecturer and three episodes were co-written by Tim Brooke-Taylor. The entire series was wiped and is no longer accessible.

== Background ==
The Culture Vultures was originally going to be piloted in Comedy Playhouse, but it was decided it was good enough to go straight to a series. After the second episode, the lead Leslie Phillips collapsed with an internal haemorrhage. He recovered enough to return to the series. His next sitcom lead would be Casanova '73.

== Cast ==
- Leslie Phillips as Dr Michael Cunningham
- Jonathan Cecil as Dr Ian Meredith
- Peter Sallis as Professor George Hobbes
- Sally Faulkner as Vivienne

== Plot ==
Dr Michael Cunningham is a senior lecturer in anthropology at the University of Hampshire. A gambler and womaniser, his quest for an easy life is frequently interrupted by his friends and colleagues. His casual attitude leads to clashes with his seniors. He enjoys the campus nightlife and is always looking for an opportunity to travel.

== Episodes ==
The series aired on Fridays at 7:55 pm. In line with the BBC's archival policy of the time, all five episodes were wiped and none are thought to survive.

No.	Title	Original release date
1	"The Indiscreet Interview"	24 April 1970
Dr Cunningham is in trouble with the Vice-Chancellor after an indiscreet television interview and he fights to keep his job.
2	"Rake's Progress"	1 May 1970
One of Cunningham's colleagues says he has invented a foolproof system of predicting the roulette wheel.
3	"Double, Double, Toil and Trouble"	8 May 1970
An efficiency expert looks into the running of the University and threatens Cunningham's trip to the West Indies.
4	"Practical Demonstrations"	15 May 1970
Dr Cunningham has to look after a visiting American professor and discovers he could get a round the world the trip investigating student unrest.
5	"Spring Fever"	22 May 1970
Cunningham overlooks management selection tests and is forced to use some apparatus for a different purpose.
