= HMS Paradise =

British TV comedy series (1964–1965)

- Genre: Sitcom
- Written by: Maurice Wiltshire; Lawrie Wyman; Lew Schwarz
- Directed by: Bill Hitchcock
- Starring: Frank Thornton; Robin Hunter
- Composer: Malcolm Lockyer
- Country of origin: United Kingdom
- Original language: English
- No. of series: 1
- No. of episodes: 26

Production
- Producer: Sid Colin
- Running time: 30 minutes
- Production company: Associated-Rediffusion Television

Original release
- Network: ITV
- Release: 16 July 1964 – 7 January 1965

HMS Paradise is a British comedy television series that originally aired on ITV between 1964 and 1965. It is set at a Royal Navy station on an island off the Dorset coast where very little actual work takes place. The show bore strong similarities to The Navy Lark, a popular radio series. All episodes are now considered to be lost.

== Main cast ==
- Frank Thornton as Commander Fairweather
- Robin Hunter as Lieutenant Pouter
- Richard Caldicot as Captain Turvey
- Ronald Radd as CPO Banyard
- Angus Lennie as Able Seaman Murdoch
- Priscilla Morgan as Amanda
- Graham Crowden as Commander Shaw
- Ambrosine Phillpotts as Mrs. Turvey

The characters of Lieutenant Pouter and CPO Banyard had previously appeared in the film version of The Navy Lark. Commander Shaw appeared also featured in both the film and several radio episodes of The Navy Lark.

A number of notable actors appeared in individual episodes of the series including Patrick Troughton, Wendy Richard, Donald Hewlett, Clive Dunn, Cardew Robinson, Sheree Winton, Martine Beswick, John Bluthal, Ernest Clark, Barbara Hicks, Pat Coombs, Robert Dorning, Howard Lang, Hugh Latimer and Brian Oulton.

== Bibliography ==
- Wagg, Stephen. Because I Tell a Joke or Two: Comedy, Politics and Social Difference. Routledge, 2004.
