= Reedham Swing Bridge =

Double-track railway swing bridge in United Kingdom

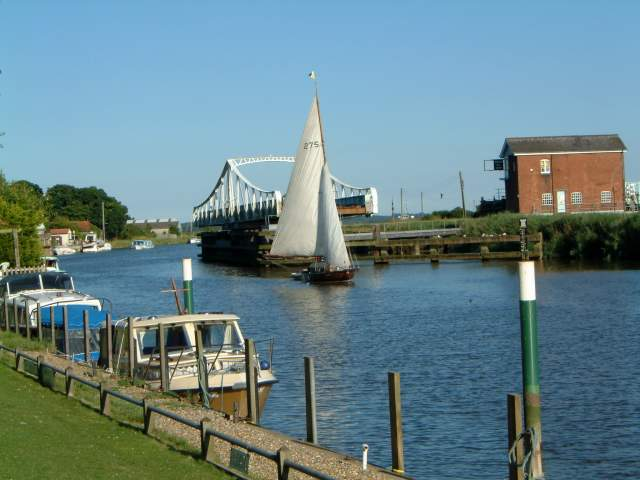
- Coordinates: 52.55887°N 1.57237°E
- Carries: Wherry railway line
- Crosses: River Yare
- Locale: Reedham, Norfolk, England
- Maintained by: Network Rail

Characteristics
- Design: Swing bridge
- Width: 54.5 feet (16.6 m)
- Clearance below: 10 feet (3.05 m)

Rail characteristics
- No. of tracks: 2
- Track gauge: 1,435 mm (56.5 in)

History
- Inaugurated: 1903
- Replaces: Single-track swing bridge of 1840s

Reedham Swing Bridge, on the site of a Victorian swing bridge, is still in use at Reedham, Norfolk, England.

It carries the Wherry railway line, between Norwich and Lowestoft, across the River Yare near Reedham railway station.

The original single track bridge was commissioned by Sir Samuel Morton Peto in the 1840s to allow the passage of wherry boats, which were too tall to pass under conventional bridges. The current bridge dates from 1902 to 1903 prior to the doubling of the track.

The bridge is operated from the 1904 Reedham Swing Bridge signal box. In a typical year, it is opened 1,300 times.
