= Reedham, Norfolk =

Village and civil parish in Norfolk, England

Coordinates: 52.56018°N 1.56889°E

Reedham
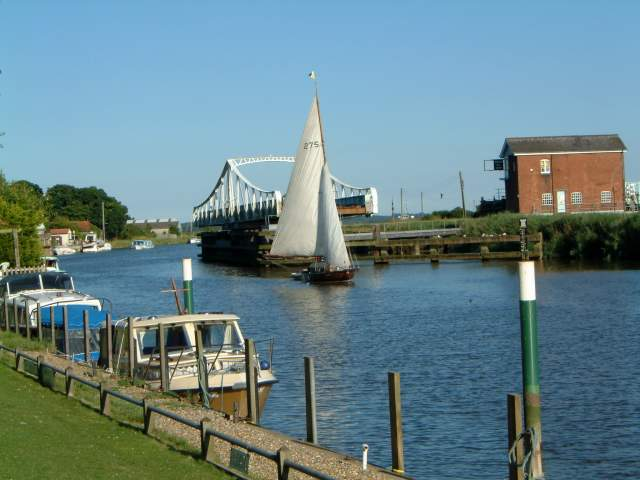
- Reedham Swing Bridge

- Location within Norfolk
- Area: 12.45 km^{2} (4.81 sq mi)
- Population: 1,207 (2011)
  - Density: 97/km^{2} (250/sq mi)
- OS grid reference: TG420018
- Civil parish: Reedham
- District: Broadland
- Shire county: Norfolk
- Region: East
- Country: England
- Sovereign state: United Kingdom
- Post town: NORWICH
- Postcode district: NR13
- Dialling code: 01493
- Police: Norfolk
- Fire: Norfolk
- Ambulance: East of England
- UK Parliament: Broadland and Fakenham

Reedham is a village and civil parish in the English county of Norfolk and within The Broads. It is on the north bank of the River Yare, 12 miles (19 km) east of the city of Norwich, 8 mi (13 km) south-west of the town of Great Yarmouth and the same distance north-west of the Suffolk town of Lowestoft. The village's name means 'reedy homestead/village' or 'reedy hemmed-in land'.

== History ==
Before the draining of the marshes towards Great Yarmouth, Reedham was a coastal village which included a Roman lighthouse. Fragments of Roman brick and stone can be found in the local church.

King Edmund of East Anglia is said to have lived here. The Fastolf family, whose most celebrated member was Sir John Fastolf, are recorded here from the 13th century.

On 21 February 1944, two United States Air Force B-17s from the 385th Bombardment Group collided above Reedham. All 21 crew members died in the crash. The two bombers were on their way back to RAF Great Ashfield after a bombing run on Diepholz Air Base.

=== Windmills ===
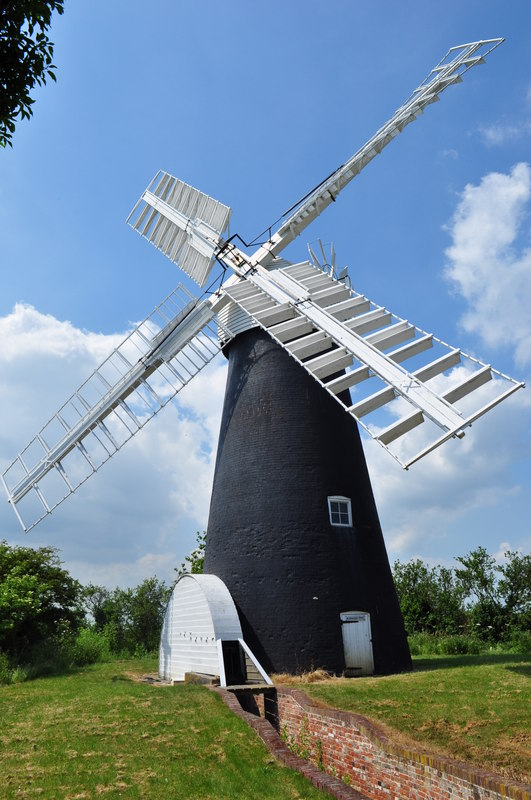
Polkey's Mill

Reedham has had a number of windmills. Most were drainage mills, although there were two corn mills.

- Berney Arms Mill. A tower mill standing in 1797. A saw, cement and drainage mill. It was demolished in 1865 and replaced by a new mill.
- Berney Arms Mill. A tower mill built in 1865. A cement and drainage mill. It was working until c.1948 and has been preserved.
- Cadge's Mill. A tower mill built in 1870. A drainage mill working until 1941, it has been conserved.
- North Mill. A tower mill built in the 19th century. A drainage mill, it was disused by 1904. The empty tower survives.
- Polkey's Mill. A tower mill built in the 19th century. A drainage mill, it was working until 1941. Restored to working order in the 2000s.
- Reedham Ferry Mill. A tower mill built in the 1840s. A drainage mill, it was working until c.1936. Converted to holiday accommodation in the late 1950s.
- Mill Road Mill. A tower mill for grinding corn. Standing in 1815, it was burnt down in 1912.
- A post mill stood near the railway station. A corn mill, it was standing in 1854. Still standing c.1920.

== Geography ==
The civil parish includes a significant area of nearby marshland, together with the famously isolated settlement of Berney Arms. It has an area of 4.81 mi^{2} (12.5 km^{2}) and in the 2001 census had a population of 925 in 406 households, increasing to a population of 1,207 in 505 households at the 2011 census.

For the purposes of local government, the parish lies within the district of Broadland.

== Transport ==
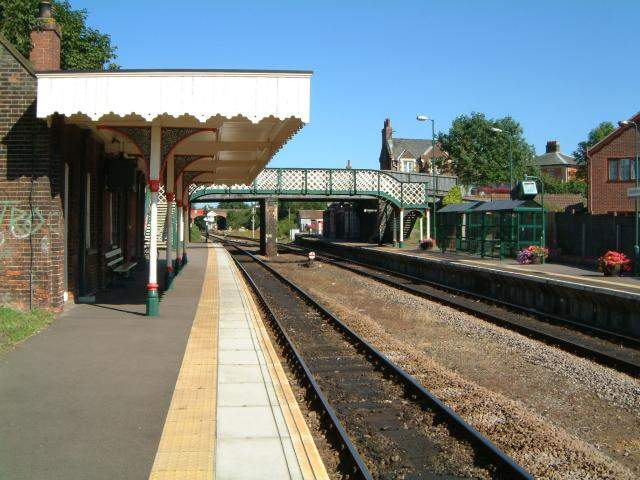
Reedham station

Reedham railway station is a stop on the Wherry Lines. Services provided by Greater Anglia connect the village with Norwich, Lowestoft and Great Yarmouth (via Berney Arms). The line to Lowestoft crosses the river on Reedham Swing Bridge.

Reedham Ferry, a chain ferry just outside the village, is the only road crossing point on the River Yare between Norwich and Great Yarmouth.

The village is served by two bus routes, operated by Our Bus and Ambassador Travel; they link the area to Acle, Beighton, Cantley and Gorleston.

== See also ==
- HMS Reedham was a Ham-class minesweeper
