= High Flight (film) =

1957 British film by John Gilling

- Theatrical poster
- Directed by: John Gilling
- Screenplay by: Ken Hughes; Joseph Landon; John Gilling; Jack Davies (story)
- Produced by: Phil C. Samuel
- Starring: Ray Milland; Kenneth Haigh; Anthony Newley; Bernard Lee
- Cinematography: Ted Moore
- Edited by: Jack Slade
- Music by: Douglas Gamley; Eric Coates (High Flight March); Kenneth V. Jones; Walford Davies (composer); Anthony Newley (composer) (Note: Newley composed and sang "The Open Boat Song", his first major song credit. Originally written as a ballad; it was performed in a small stage review in 1952.)
- Production company: Warwick Films
- Distributed by: Columbia Pictures
- Release date: 12 September 1957 (World Premiere)
- Running time: 89 minutes colour (Europe); 86 minutes black and white (US)
- Country: United States
- Language: English

High Flight is a 1957 British CinemaScope Cold War film, directed by John Gilling and starring Ray Milland, Bernard Lee and Leslie Phillips.

The title of the film was derived from the 1941 poem of the same title by Pilot Officer John Gillespie Magee Jr., an Anglo-American aviator who flew for the Royal Canadian Air Force (RCAF) and lost his life in 1941 over RAF Cranwell, where much of the film was shot. (Note: The poem, "High Flight" has endured as a favourite poem among aviators and recently, astronauts; even President Ronald Reagan, on the occasion of the loss of the Challenger Space Shuttle. It serves as the official poem of the Royal Canadian Air Force and Royal Air Force and it is required to be recited by memory by fourth class cadets (freshmen) at the United States Air Force Academy (USAFA) where it is also depicted in its Field House.)

== Plot ==
A group of flight cadets arrive at RAF Cranwell to begin a three-year training course to become RAF pilots. Amongst the group is Tony Winchester, who makes a memorable entrance by landing his civilian Taylorcraft Auster aircraft with his girlfriend aboard on the RAF runway just ahead of a de Havilland Vampire jet trainer piloted by Wing Commander Rudge.

During the Second World War, Winchester's father had been Rudge's commanding officer and was killed protecting Rudge, who had disobeyed orders. Winchester is a difficult individual who harbours animosity towards Rudge over his father's death. Another of the aspiring pilots is the scientific minded Roger Endicott who is also determined to create a working flying saucer. Endicott's flying radio-controlled model develops difficulties and crashes into the middle of a Bishop's tea party.

Winchester does not learn the meaning of teamwork and is nearly killed when he disobeys orders, flying into a storm. Rudge demands his resignation but reconsiders, remembering his own rash behaviour had been the cause of the death of Winchester's father. Rudge ultimately selects Winchester to fly in a precision aerial team training for the Farnborough Airshow. When the squadron is temporarily posted to a forward base in West Germany, Winchester flies close to hostile territory near the inner-German border and is nearly shot down by East German anti-aircraft guns firing across the border. The wounded airman and his stricken aircraft are rescued by Rudge, who brings him back safely to a crash landing at his home base. Finally, Winchester comes to understand his role in the RAF and that he is part of a team effort.

== Cast ==
As appearing in screen credits (main roles identified):

Actor	Role
Ray Milland	Wing Commander Granite Rudge
Bernard Lee	Flight Sergeant Harris
Kenneth Haigh	Anthony "Tony" Winchester
Anthony Newley	Cadet Roger Endicott
Kenneth Fortescue	John Fletcher
Sean Kelly	Cadet Day
Helen Cherry	Louise Dawson
Leslie Phillips	Squadron Leader Blake
Duncan Lamont	Weapons Corporal
M. E. Clifton James	Field Marshal Montgomery
Kynaston Reeves	Air Minister
John Le Mesurier	Commandant
Jan Brooks	Diana
Jan Holden	Jackie
Frank Atkinson	Parker
Ian Fleming	Bishop
Nancy Nevinson	Bishop's wife
Grace Arnold	Commandant's wife
Hal Osmond	barman
Bernard Horsfall	radar operator
George Woodbridge (actor)	farmer

High Flight Lobby card

== Production ==
Irving Allen and Albert Broccoli commissioned Jack Davies to write a screenplay about the present day Royal Air Force. Davies visited various RAF stations in Britain and Germany as well as the RAF College at Cranwell. "To say that I was impressed with what I saw and learnt was an understatement", said Davies. "These young men who fly daily at supersonic speeds are the flower of our youth. They work hard and they play hard." Ken Hughes worked on the script

Photography was originally scheduled around No. 111 Squadron RAF, nicknamed "Treble One" or "Tremblers", stationed at RAF Wattisham. The squadron was in the process of, or had been recently selected as the Royal Air Force Fighter Command Aerobatics Display Team, which became known as the Black Arrows. Film of the team at the 1956 Farnborough Airshow was featured. When inclement weather interrupted filming at their home base, the production moved to RAF Leuchars in Fife. Scotland, base of No. 43 Squadron RAF. RAF Leuchars later stood in for RAF Wunsdorf in West Germany. Principal photography which began on 10 April 1957, also took place at RAF Cranwell, Lincolnshire, using not only the facility but also film of the graduating ceremony of a training course, as well as RAF Chivenor, Devon, United Kingdom.

The use of RAF Percival Provost piston and de Havilland Vampire T.11 jet training aircraft and operational Hawker Hunter fighter aircraft heightened the authenticity of the film. During the course of production at RAF Leuchars, a Hunter "wheeled up" which allowed the film crew to use the wreck to simulate a Hunter crash. When the RAF did not allow the film crew to use an operational airframe as a camera aircraft, one Hunter was converted into a "PR" version, specially modified at great cost, to carry a forward-facing Cinemascope camera. A screen was drawn on the front windscreen of the camera Hunter with a chinagraph crayon. The pilot was instructed to fill the windscreen with aircraft. Additional air-to-air shots were taken from an Avro Lincoln bomber. (Note: A blatant continuity error occurs in Winchester's solo flight in a Vampire T.11 when stock in-flight and landing footage of a single-seat Vampire fighter are interspersed with live-action and animation shots of the jet trainer.) Other aircraft visible in the film include Handley Page Hastings transport aircraft and Bristol Sycamore helicopters.

The casting of Ray Milland was typical of the Warwick Films productions, in using the star power of a Hollywood actor but in the case of Milland, he was also well suited to the film and its subject matter. During the 1930s and into the 1940s, the Welsh-born actor had moved to Hollywood and during the Second World War, had served as a civilian instructor for the United States Army Air Forces.

The movie was Anne Aubrey's first appearanace for Warwick Films. The company put her under long-term contract.

Filming began on 2 April 1957. However, as early as November 1956 Gilling was filming plane footage.

== Release ==
The film had a Gala World Premiere on 12 September 1957 at the Empire, Leicester Square. Released in England during Battle of Britain Week, High Flight did not fare well with critics. The film was a commercial success, leading to a studio re-release in 1961.

== Reception ==
=== Box office ===
In 1959 Irving Allen said Warwick Productions lost money on the film.

=== Critical ===
Variety wrote "Some rather stirring final air sequences save this... from utter mediocrity."

The Monthly Film Bulletin wrote:

Saddled with an absurd story concerning an irascible air cadet and a Wing Commander with a guilt complex, High Flight never really recovers from its banal central situation; also its emphasis on the glamour and high jinks of R.A.F. life sometimes gives it the appearance of a gaudy recruiting poster. Neither is the playing especially convincing: Ray Milland gives a tired and curiously strained performance, while Kenneth Haigh is made to repeat the more tiresome characteristics of his stage Jimmy Porter. The flying scenes, however, are entirely praiseworthy, being expertly shot and, in the concluding scenes, notably well composed for the wide screen.

Flight magazine noted that the aviation theme dominated, with 40 minutes of film time devoted to flying sequences.

In British Sound Films: The Studio Years 1928–1959 David Quinlan rated the film as "average", writing: "Superb flying scenes fail to compensate for ridiculous plot."

Later reviewers commented that the film was "... well written and acted. Lots of authentic jet flying sequences".

Leonard Maltin wrote: " (a) stale British drama of recruits in training for the RAF ... Last reel, in the air, (was the) only exciting part."

Filmink wrote "the movie is of interest today for plane buffs and the plot’s similarities to Top Gun with Kenneth Haigh as the cocky Tom Cruise figure. There was no romance. Depart from formula at your peril!"

== Home video release ==
Although rarely seen on television and at times the US version, only in black and white, is broadcast, a DVD in colour is now available.

== See also ==
- List of American films of 1957
