= Jan Holden =

British actress (1931–2005)

- Born: Valerie Jeanne Wilkinson; 9 May 1931; Southport, Lancashire, England
- Died: 11 October 2005 (aged 74); London, England
- Education: Lowther College
- Alma mater: Old Vic
- Occupation: Actress
- Years active: 1954–1989
- Television: Fabian of the Yard, Douglas Fairbanks Jr., Presents, The Champions, The Vise, The Avengers, The Cheaters, The Saint, The Baron, Harper's West One, Are You Being Served?, Casanova '73, Agony, O Happy Band!
- Spouse(s): Edwin Richfield (m. 1952; div. 1973) Louis Manson (m. 1988; died 2004)
- Children: 3 (6 Step children)
- Relatives: Amanda Holden (great niece)

Valerie Jeanne Wilkinson (9 May 1931 – 11 October 2005) was an English actress known as Jan Holden, using her mother's maiden name as a stage name. In theatre she was known for her performances in light comedy and appeared in several television series during the 1950s, 1960s and 1970s.

== Early life ==
Born in Southport, Lancashire, Jeanne Wilkinson, as she then was, spent her early childhood in India, where her father was a senior manager at the Swadeshi Cotton Mills in Kanpur. At the age of six, she and her twin brother Geoffrey were sent to schools in the hills near Simla. Getting there took a two-day train journey. The term lasted nine months, and there were three months at home during the cool season. The schools were not mixed, so she and her brother only met at church on Sundays. Holden was heartbroken when her twin brother drowned during the early 1960s.

On the outbreak of the Second World War, Holden and her mother returned to Britain, where she became a boarder at Lowther College in North Wales. When the war ended, her mother returned to India while Jan stayed at her school and lived with school friends during the holidays. At the age of eighteen, she was offered places at the Royal Academy of Dramatic Art, the Old Vic School, and the Bristol Old Vic, but her father declined to pay the fees, as he disapproved of her ambition to go on the stage. Eventually, he was persuaded to allow her to take a directors' course at the Old Vic, where she was one of two pupils chosen as assistant stage managers.

== Career ==
After the Old Vic, Holden turned to repertory, where she met her first husband, the actor Edwin Richfield. The couple married in 1952, while they were both appearing in a stage version of The Blue Lamp.

Holden was an elegant actress, known for her arresting pale blue eyes. She made her West End debut in 1958 in Speaking of Murder at St Martin's Theatre, which was followed by The Tunnel of Love, a farce at the Apollo Theatre.

=== Television ===
Her television credits included Fabian of the Yard, Douglas Fairbanks Jr., Presents, The Champions, The Vise, The Avengers, Bird of Prey, The Cheaters, The Saint, The Baron, Harpers West One, Are You Being Served?, Casanova '73, Agony and O Happy Band!.

== Personal life ==
Holden's marriage to actor Edwin Richfield broke down in 1973, leaving her with three teenage children.

In 1988, she married Louis Manson, a solicitor and businessman, but she was already in poor health and remained so during her final two decades. In 1999, one of her twin daughters died from a brain tumour, but she remained cheerful and courageous until her own death in 2005. She was survived by her husband, the son and remaining daughter of her first marriage, and two stepdaughters and four stepsons.

== Filmography ==
Holden's film appearances included:

- The Hornet's Nest (1955) – Miss Wentworth
- I Am a Camera (1955) – Clive's party guest
- No Smoking (1955) – Receptionist
- Fire Maidens from Outer Space (1956) – Fire maiden
- Assignment Redhead (1956) – Sally Jennings
- Quatermass 2 (1957) – Young girl
- High Flight (1957) – Jackie
- The Whole Truth (1958) – Party guest
- The Camp on Blood Island (1958) – Nurse
- A Woman Possessed (1958) – Mary
- Passionate Summer (1958) – Air hostess
- Links of Justice (1958) – Elsie
- The Stranglers of Bombay (1959) – Mary Lewis
- Escort for Hire (1960) – Elizabeth
- Never Let Go (1960) – Mrs. Hurst
- The Primitives (1962) – Cheta
- The Saint (episode: "The Persistent Parasites", 1965) – Vera
- The Saint (episode: "The Fast Women", 1967) – Cynthia Quillen
- Work Is a Four-Letter Word (1968) – Mrs. Price
- The Haunted House of Horror (1969) – Peggy
- The Best House in London (1969) – Lady Dilke
- One Brief Summer (1971) – Elizabeth
- Dominique (1978) – Ballard's secretary
