= The Navy Lark =

British radio sitcom (1959–1977)

- The Navy Lark title card featuring photos of (clockwise from top right) Leslie Phillips, Jon Pertwee and Stephen Murray
- Genre: Sitcom
- Running time: 30 minutes
- Country of origin: United Kingdom
- Language: English
- Home station: BBC Light Programme; BBC Radio 2
- Syndicates: BBC Radio 4 Extra
- Starring: Leslie Phillips; Jon Pertwee; Stephen Murray; Dennis Price; Judy Cornwell; Heather Chasen; Ronnie Barker; Richard Caldicot; Michael Bates; Tenniel Evans
- Written by: Lawrie Wyman; George Evans
- Original release: 29 March 1959 – 16 July 1977
- No. of episodes: 244 (including specials) (list of episodes)

The Navy Lark is a radio sitcom about life aboard a British Royal Navy frigate named HMS Troutbridge (a play on HMS Troubridge, a Royal Navy destroyer) based in HMNB Portsmouth. In Series 1 and 2, the ship and crew were stationed offshore at an unnamed location known simply as "The Island". In Series 2, this island was revealed to be owned by Lt. Cdr. Stanton.

For most of its run the show starred Leslie Phillips, Jon Pertwee and Stephen Murray, whose names rotated in order of precedence with each new episode over the entire 15-series run. The programme was transmitted on the BBC Light Programme and subsequently BBC Radio 2. It was produced by Alastair Scott Johnston.

Episodes of The Navy Lark series have been replayed on BBC Radio 4 Extra.

== Plot ==
Episodes were self-contained, although there was continuity within the series, and sometimes a reference to a previous episode might be made. A normal episode consisted of Sub Lt Phillips, scheming Chief Petty Officer Pertwee, and bemused Lt. Murray trying to get out of trouble they created for themselves without their direct superior, Commander (later Captain) "Thunderguts" Povey finding out. Scenes frequently featured a string of eccentric characters, often played by Ronnie Barker or Jon Pertwee. Over the course of the programme Lt Murray marries Admiral Ffont-Bittocks' daughter Rita.

The Republic of Potarneyland, a country situated somewhere on the Indian subcontinent, is featured in several episodes. Over the course of the series, it is revealed that Potarneyland had recently been granted independence from Great Britain, and had joined NATO because the Potanis considered it to be a "free gift scheme". During Series 3 of The Navy Lark, a Potarneyland frigate, the Poppadom, appears in several episodes manned by various Potani officers voiced by Michael Bates and Ronnie Barker.

== Cast ==
- Dennis Price as Lieutenant Dennis Price ("Number One") (Series 1, 4)
- Leslie Phillips as Sub-Lieutenant Leslie Phillips (Series 1-15), Captain McDoom (Series 13-14)
- Jon Pertwee as Chief Petty Officer "Jonsy" Pertwee (Series 1-15), Commander Ambrose Weatherby (Series 8-15), Vice-Admiral Buttenshaw (Series 10-12), Vice-Admiral "Burbly" Burwasher (Series 12-15), The Master (Series 13-14)
- Stephen Murray as Lieutenant/Lieutenant Commander Stephen Murray ("Number One") (Series 2-15), Lord Quirk (Series 12-13)
- Richard Caldicot as Commander/Captain Henry Povey (Series 1-15)
- Ronnie Barker as Able Seaman "Fatso" Johnson (Series 1-9), Lieutenant Commander/Commander Archibald Stanton (Series 1-7), Intelligence (Series 2-9), Harold Golfball (Series 3-7, 9), Mr. Merrivale (Series 3-4, 6-9), Commander Bell (Series 5-9), Lieutenant Queeg (Series 6-9), Captain Hardcastle (Series 8-9)
- Heather Chasen as WREN Heather Chasen (Series 1-4, 6-15), Mrs. Ramona Povey (Series 2-4, 6-15), Lady Amelia Todhunter-Brown (Series 2-4, 6-8, 10, 12-14), Second Officer Jean Maclootie (Series 9), Rita Murray (née Ffont-Bittocks) (Series 11-15), Myrtle Pertwee (Series 11-13, 15), WREN Simpkins (Series 12-13)
- Tenniel Evans as Able Seaman/Leading Seaman Taffy Goldstein (Series 1-15), Ebenezer "Nunkie" Pertwee (Series 1-15), the Admiral (Series 1-6), Sir Willoughby Todhunter-Brown (Series 2-4, 6-14), Admiral Ffont-Bittocks (Series 7-15), Lieutenant Deacon (Series 12-14)
- Michael Bates as Commander Shaw (Series 1), Able Seaman Ginger (Series 1-7, 9-12, 14), Commander Bracewell (Series 2-6, 8-13), Mad Pierre (Series 2, 13-14), Lieutenant Bates (Series 3-7, 10), Samuel Pepys Washington-Burt (Series 3-7, 9), Rear Admiral Ironbridge (Series 4-6, 9-14), the Padre (Series 6-15), Flag Lieutenant Claude Dingle (Series 7-12), Captain Ignatius Aloysius Atcheson (Series 8-15), Lieutenant Birkett (Series 12-14), Vice Admiral Prout (Series 13-15)
- Judy Cornwell as WREN Judy Cornwell (Series 4)
- Janet Brown as WREN Vera Timkins (Series 5)
- Lawrie Wyman as Able Seaman Tiddy (Series 6, 10-11), Intelligence (Series 10-13), various
- April Walker as WREN Samantha Barrett (Series 15). April had been contracted to appear as the new companion to Jon Pertwee in Doctor Who but was replaced before filming began after Pertwee objected.

Guests:

- Pamela Buck as Joyce ("Operation Fag End")
- Derek Francis as Sir Jeremy Crighton-Buller ("Pertwee and the Tratvian Beer")
- Gretta Gouriet as Helen ("Helen, The New Wren")
- Nigel Graham as Able Seaman Simpson ("The Smugglers Return"), Leading Seaman Harper ("The Anti-Submarine Missile"), and Clarence ("Sub-Conductor Phillips")
- Miriam Margolyes as Gloria ("The Island Swordfish")
- Elizabeth Morgan as Mary Wilson ("Harold Wilson Reviews the Fleet"), the miniskirted spy ("The Relief of the Weather Ship"), Pussy Abundance ("The Tonipouhaha Treasure"), and Lady Fabia ("Povey — An Admiral at Last")
- Amanda Murray (Stephen Murray's daughter) as WREN Amanda Murray ("Confirming Povey's Rank"), Fenella Star ("A Filthy Ferryboat"), WREN Amanda Martin ("Jigsaws and Jemmies"), and Mandy ("The Portsmouth Kiosk")
- Chic Murray as Lieutenant Queeg ("The Digital Isles Go Unstable" and "Egbert Hitches a Ride")
- Pete Murray as himself ("The Case of the HGM Mark 5")
- Alan Reeve-Jones as Commander Trotter ("Commander Trotter Takes Charge" and "The South Kawowan Summit"), Herr Kapitan Hans ("Captain Povey Takes Over"), and Harold Wilson ("Harold Wilson Reviews the Fleet")
- Norma Ronald as WREN Veronica Penfold ("The Mysterious Radio Signals"), Miss Belinda Bottomley ("Operation Cowes Barge"), and Maisie Clinger ("Number One's Anniversary")
- Frank Thornton as Henry Pettigrew ("Pertwee and the Tratvian Beer") and CPO Nathaniel Pertwee ("The Phenomenal Pertwee Tug")
- June Tobin as Maisie ("A Crisp Romance") and Charlotte Stanton ("Families' Day")
- Jan Waters as WREN Jan Waters ("Taking Some Liberties" and "Smugglers in the Solent")
- June Whitfield as Freda ("The TV Documentary"), Madam Elvira Pertwee ("Hypnotising Ramona"), and the Mistress ("Captain Povey's Wig" and "The Talpinium Shell")

== Background ==
Jon Pertwee is frequently quoted as having suggested the idea of a forces comedy based on the Royal Navy, but Alastair Scott Johnston and writer Lawrie Wyman both contemplated an Air Force- and an Army-themed sitcom before going to the BBC with The Navy Lark. Wyman included ideas based on excuses for late return from leave and other misdemeanours from HMS Troubridge bulletins. He worked with George Evans (Pertwee's personal scriptwriter) from quite early on, but Alastair Scott Johnston did not want him named until the 12th series onward.

== Production ==
A Radio Times magazine extract from 1960, showing the cast of the show and promoting the show's return.

The series used accents and characterised voices to supplement the humour, as well as a good deal of innuendo.

The show's theme tune was "Trade Wind Hornpipe" written and performed by Tommy Reilly on a Barry Music compilation of short interlude pieces published in 1958 on BMC118. In one episode, The Return of Sir Frederick Flatley, a brief snippet of the theme tune is heard when Lieutenant Bates tries to connect the ship to a whaling ship by radio and accidentally "connects" to the actual radio.

The programme was strong on creating identifiable characters; the listener was able to clearly differentiate each person Laurie Wyman created, many of whom acquired enduring catchphrases, most notably from Sub Lieutenant Phillips: "Corrrrr", "Ooh, nasty...", "Oh lumme!", and "Left hand down a bit". "Ev'rybody down!" was a phrase of CPO Pertwee's, necessitated by a string of incomprehensible navigation orders by Phillips, and followed by a sound effect of the ship crashing. Also, whenever Pertwee had a menial job to be done, Able Seaman Johnson was always first in line to do it, inevitably against his will: "You're rotten, you are!". The telephone response from Naval Intelligence (Ronnie Barker), was always an extremely gormless and dimwitted delivery of "'Ello, Intelligence 'ere" or "This is intelligence speakin'".

Other recurring verbal features were the invented words "humgrummit" and "floggle-toggle" which served to cover all manner of unspecified objects ranging from foodstuffs to naval equipment. Unspecified illnesses include "the twingeing screws", an illness to which Pertwee was a martyr, especially when hearing about being under sailing orders. Ronnie Barker's versatile contributions were recognised and Laurie Wyman (later known as Lawrie Wyman) was asked by the producer to write more parts for Barker.

Dennis Price returned for a guest appearance in the fourth series episode A Hole Lieutenant. Other 'guest stars' included April Walker, Norma Ronald and June Whitfield.

== Radio spin-offs ==
=== The TV Lark ===
The TV Lark was intended to be a replacement for The Navy Lark starting with what would have been the programme's fifth series. This situation came about due to the head of light entertainment believing that "forces"-based humour had become dated and television was the next "big thing", so Lawrie Wyman was ordered to create a show with the same cast in an independent TV station situation. Alastair Scott Johnston and Wyman tried to stop this but were overruled: hence, the arrival of The TV Lark.

The entire crew had been drummed out of the service and hired by Troutbridge TV Ltd. Janet Brown joined the cast due to the absence of Heather Chasen for this series. However, mainly due to public pressure, the production team of Alastair Scott Johnston and Laurie Wyman managed to revert the show to nautical capers. Storylines in The TV Lark nudged back to naval origins across the ten episodes until they were finally reunited with Troutbridge, which continued for another six episodes as the fifth series of The Navy Lark.

=== The Embassy Lark ===
Also written by Wyman, three series of The Embassy Lark were broadcast from 1966 to 1968. It starred Frank Thornton and Derek Francis.

The show was set in the British Embassy in the fictional country of Tratvia and was concerned with the various (mis)adventures of the British Ambassador Sir Jeremy Crighton-Buller (Francis) and his First Secretary Henry Pettigrew (Thornton) as they tried to keep smooth relations between Tratvia, Whitehall and the other Embassies (China, the USSR and the U.S.). Ronnie Barker, Stephen Murray, Lawrie Wyman, and Leslie Phillips reprised their Navy Lark roles in two episodes. Francis and Thornton also appeared in character in one episode of The Navy Lark.

=== The Big Business Lark ===
Another Wyman creation, The Big Business Lark was broadcast as one series in 1969. It starred Jimmy Edwards and Frank Thornton

The show is set in the boardroom of fictional company British United Plastics, and concerns the business machinations of the chairman, Sir Charles Boniface (Edwards), and his son and deputy chairman, Frank Boniface (Thornton). Gwen Cherrell played the secretary. The Times Obituary column reported her death on the 24th of April, 2019, on the 18th of May.

== Adaptations ==
=== Film and television ===
In 1959, a film version was released, also called The Navy Lark. Written by Laurie Wyman and Sid Colin and directed by Gordon Parry, it stars Cecil Parker, Ronald Shiner, Elvi Hale, Leslie Phillips and Nicholas Phipps. The setting was changed where "The Island" was named Boonsey, a fictional Channel Island. According to Jon Pertwee's co-written memoir, published shortly after his death in 1996, the film was also supposed to star Pertwee and Dennis Price. However, according to Pertwee the film's producer Herbert Wilcox refused to employ Price "because he was gay." Pertwee was among those who objected to Price not being in the film and believed that this contributed to his own replacement in the cast by Shiner. Pertwee noted that the film "bombed" and said audiences did not consider the film to be The Navy Lark due to the absence of himself, Price and Stephen Murray.

Wyman co-wrote with three other writers a television sitcom HMS Paradise (Associated-Rediffusion, 1964–5) set in a naval shore establishment in which Caldicot played Captain Turvey, but only one series was made. The entire series is considered lost.

=== Radio adaptations ===
The show was cut from 30 to 27 minutes by BBC Transcription services, then the discs were exported around the world except for South Africa. Springbok Radio broadcast to English speaking listeners from their Durban studios, but because it was a commercial station, the BBC refused to allow the station to re-broadcast the recorded shows. However, the station acquired the scripts from Wyman and edited them to around twenty-five minutes each, to accommodate the commercial breaks. The revised show was recorded by local actors in front of a live audience. All the UK associations were kept for the South African audiences.
