= My Wife Jacqueline =

- Genre: Sitcom
- Written by: A.P. Dearsley
- Starring: Leslie Phillips; Joy Shelton; Anthea Holloway
- Country of origin: United Kingdom
- No. of series: 1
- No. of episodes: 6

Production
- Producer: Dicky Leeman
- Running time: 30 minutes

Original release
- Network: BBC Television Service
- Release: 30 July – 22 October 1952

My Wife Jacqueline is a British sitcom that aired on the BBC Television Service in 1952. It starred Leslie Phillips and Joy Shelton as a young married couple. For Phillips it was his first lead in a television serial.

== Cast ==
- Leslie Phillips – Tom Bridger
- Joy Shelton – Jacqueline Bridger
- Desmond Llewelyn – Keith Appleyard
- Anthea Holloway – Margaret
- Edward Dentith – Trevor Mathews
- Virginia Carol – Gwendoline
- Delphi Lawrence – Peggy de Varney
- David Keir – Reverend Osborne
- H.G. Stoker – General Bridger

== Episodes ==
My Wife Jacqueline aired on Wednesdays at around 8.30pm. The programme was broadcast live from Lime Grove Studios and believed never to have been recorded.

#	Episode Title	Original Broadcast Date
1	"The Mysterious Complaint"	30 July 1952
2	"The Agonies of Courtship"	13 August 1952
3	"Common Interests"	10 September 1952
4	"Getting Margaret Married"	24 September 1952
5	"The Landed Proprietor"	8 October 1952
6	"Happily Ever After"	22 October 1952

== Reception ==
In his 2006 autobiography, Hello, Phillips said "The script was as light as a feather, with characters who appeared to live in a social, political and cultural vacuum that made Mrs Dale's Diary look like a profound study of social history." He also said "we were all surprised how this production reached the public."
