= HMS Reedham =

Minesweeper of the Royal Navy

History

United Kingdom
- Name: HMS Reedham
- Namesake: Reedham
- Builder: Saunders-Roe
- Launched: 19 August 1958
- Completed: 20 November 1958
- Fate: Sold August 1966

General characteristics
- Class & type: Ham-class minesweeper
- Notes: Pennant number(s): M2723 / IMS60

HMS Reedham was one of 93 ships of the Ham-class of inshore minesweepers.

The ship was named after Reedham in Norfolk. It portrayed the fictional HMS Compton in the 1959 film The Navy Lark.
