= Desmond Llewelyn =

Welsh actor (1914–1999)

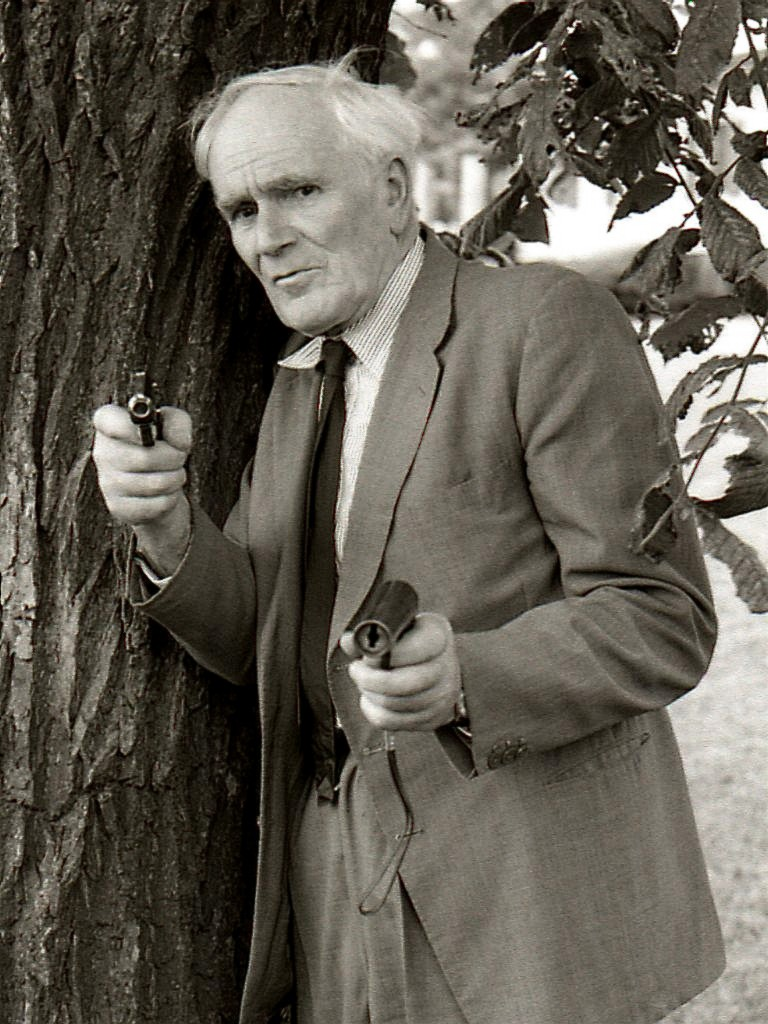
- Llewelyn as Q in Sweden while promoting Octopussy in 1983
- Born: Desmond Wilkinson Llewelyn; 12 September 1914; Newport, Monmouthshire, Wales
- Died: 19 December 1999 (aged 85); Eastbourne, East Sussex, England
- Education: Royal Academy of Dramatic Art
- Occupation: Actor
- Years active: 1939–99
- Spouse: Pamela Pantlin (m. 1938)
- Children: 2
- Military career
- Allegiance: United Kingdom
- Branch: British Army
- Service years: 1939–45
- Rank: Second Lieutenant
- Unit: Royal Welsh Fusiliers
- Conflicts: World War II

Signature
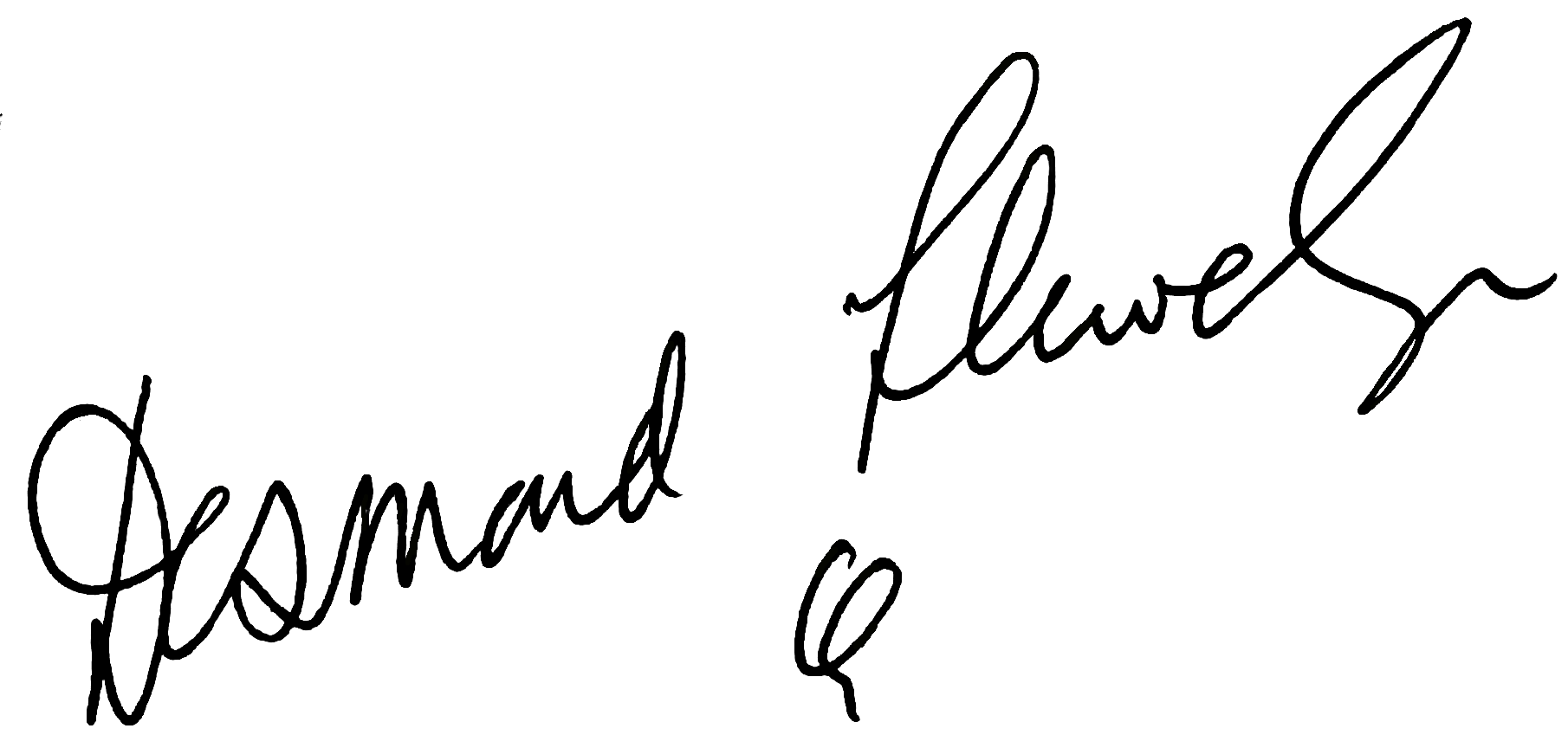

Desmond Wilkinson Llewelyn (Welsh: [ɬɛˈwɛlɪn]; 12 September 1914 – 19 December 1999) was a Welsh actor. He was best known for his role as Q, MI6's quartermaster, in 17 of the Eon-produced James Bond films between 1963 and 1999.

== Early life ==
Blaen-y-Pant House, the birthplace of Desmond Llewelyn

Llewelyn was born on 12 September 1914 at Blaen-y-Pant House in Bettws in Newport, the son of Mia (née Wilkinson) and Ivor Llewelyn. Desmond's father was a coal mining engineer, who notably purchased the first Bentley production automobile, a Bentley 3-litre from W. O. Bentley in 1921. His paternal grandfather, Llewelyn Llewelyn of Kings Hill, was the High Sheriff of Monmouthshire as well as General Manager of the Powell-Dyffryn Steam Coal Company.

While Llewelyn originally wanted to be a minister, he became involved in theatrical productions during his education at Radley College. Initially working as a stagehand, he was encouraged to take on more acting roles by his fellow pupil Dennis Price. During his education, Llewelyn gained renown as a skilled sportsman, particularly as a rugby player and he remained a fan of the game throughout his life. The young Llewelyn would play rugby for Newport RFC and can be seen wearing the club tie in The Living Daylights as well as that of Malpas Cricket Club in Octopussy.

Despite the objections of his father, Llewelyn decided to pursue an acting career, and was accepted into the Royal Academy of Dramatic Art in 1934. In 1937 Llewelyn found work with a number of small stage roles, working with Matthew Forsyth and the Forsyth Players, and it was through this company that Llewelyn met Pamela Mary Pantlin whom he married in 1938. The following year, Llewelyn appeared in his first feature film, the British comedy Ask a Policeman.

=== War service ===
Llewelyn's nascent acting career was paused by the outbreak of war in 1939, when he was commissioned as a second lieutenant in the Royal Welch Fusiliers. In 1940, his unit was engaged in fighting an entire Panzer division for several days near the French city of Lille, but they were overrun in attempting to retreat to Dunkirk, and Llewelyn was captured. He spent the remainder of the war in prisoner of war camps, first at Laufen, before he was transferred to Colditz Castle (Oflag IV-C) following his attempted escape from Laufen by tunnelling out. Llewelyn remained imprisoned at Colditz until it was liberated by Allied forces in 1945.

== Acting career ==
After the war, Llewelyn continued his career as an actor, returning to television work in Sir Robert Atkins' 1946 film of A Midsummer Night's Dream. He also acted on stage with Laurence Olivier and Vivien Leigh, before appearing in Olivier's 1948 film Hamlet. Llewelyn continued to gain work in television, notably portraying Mr Hyde in The Strange Case of Dr. Jekyll and Mr. Hyde, as well as roles in TV series My Wife Jacqueline, The Adventures of Robin Hood and The Invisible Man.

In 1950, Llewelyn drew on both his war experience and Welsh background to play a supporting role as "'77 Jones" a Welsh tank commander in the film They Were Not Divided directed by Terence Young. Throughout the 1950s, Llewelyn appeared in a number of small roles in films such as The Lavender Hill Mob, Valley of Song, A Night to Remember, Knights of the Round Table, Sword of Sherwood Forest, and he appeared in the 1961 Hammer Horror film The Curse of the Werewolf.

=== James Bond series ===
In 1963, Terence Young asked Llewelyn to read for the part of Quartermaster Major Boothroyd in From Russia with Love, the second release in the official Bond film series. Both Young and Ian Fleming wanted 'Q' to be portrayed as a Welshman with a strong Welsh accent, and Young had Llewelyn use a broad South Wales accent in They Were Not Divided. Llewelyn fought against the idea suggesting that such a character would never have been allowed to rise to the rank of Major in the British service. Llewelyn persuaded them that the character should have an upper-class English accent, with Llewelyn later stating that he played him as a "toffee nosed Englishman ever since".

Llewelyn would go on to become a staple of the film series for over thirty years, appearing in all but two EON-produced Bond films during his lifetime (the exceptions being 1962’s Dr. No and 1973's Live and Let Die). In total, Llewelyn played 'Q' in seventeen films, appearing in more Bond films than any other actor and playing opposite each of the first five Bond actors: Sean Connery, George Lazenby, Roger Moore, Timothy Dalton and Pierce Brosnan.

In 1967, Llewelyn portrayed 'Q' alongside Lois Maxwell's Miss Moneypenny in an EON-produced television documentary entitled Welcome to Japan, Mr. Bond. This promotional film was included in the 2006 Special Edition DVD release of You Only Live Twice.

His last appearance as 'Q' before his death was in The World Is Not Enough in 1999. During his briefing of 007 in the film, Q introduces John Cleese's character, R, as his heir presumptive, and the film alludes to Q's retirement, to which Bond, after seeing Q, expresses his hope that it will not be any time soon. Q's response is to admonish Bond to "always have an escape plan", after which he lowers himself through the floor of his lab. Llewelyn had stated not long before his death that he had no plans to retire and that he would continue playing Q "as long as the producers want me and the Almighty doesn't".

The part of 'Q' would make Llewelyn immensely popular among Bond fans and one of British cinema's most recognisable character actors. As such, Llewelyn would front a number of Bond related commercials, including two promotions for the video games GoldenEye 007 and Tomorrow Never Dies.

=== Other roles ===
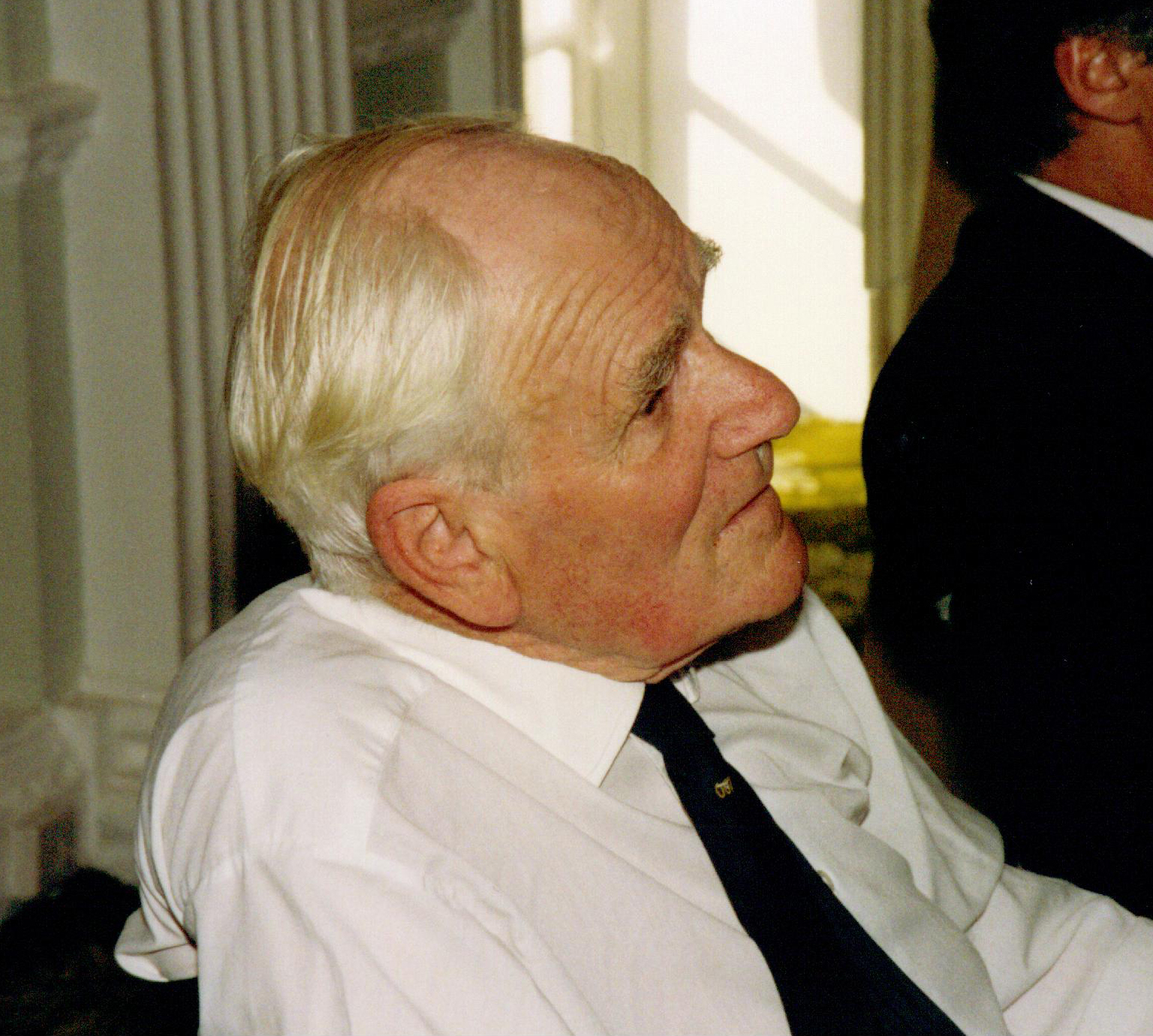
Llewelyn in 1992

Llewellyn continued to act in other roles throughout his tenure as 'Q', notably appearing the 1963 film Cleopatra (as a Roman senator), and the 1981 PBS production of Dr. Jekyll and Mr. Hyde, and he had a small role in the musical Chitty Chitty Bang Bang (1968), which was itself based on a children's book by Bond author Ian Fleming. Llewelyn would also appear as Geoffrey Maddocks ('The Colonel') in the British television series Follyfoot from 1971 to 1973, and the BBC Wales production The Life and Times of David Lloyd George with Philip Madoc.

The Bond film Live and Let Die was filmed during the third series of Follyfoot, and Llewelyn was written out of the series for three episodes so he could appear in the film. However, the Bond producers ultimately decided to leave the character out of the film anyway, much to Llewelyn's annoyance.

He was the subject of This Is Your Life in 1995 when he was surprised by Michael Aspel at London's Hyde Park Hotel, during a press launch for the new Bond film, GoldenEye.

== Personal life ==
Llewelyn married Pamela Mary Pantlin in Kensington in May 1938. The couple had two sons, Charles Ivor (b. 1949) and Justin Cather (1953–2012). Despite playing an inventor in the Bond films, Llewelyn always maintained that he was totally lost in the world of technology, a trait that also plagued his successors, John Cleese and Ben Whishaw. A biography entitled Q: The Biography of Desmond Llewelyn was written by Sandy Hernu, and it was subsequently released on 1 November 1999.

=== Death ===
On 19 December 1999, Llewelyn was driving alone from a book signing event when his Renault Mégane collided head-on with a Fiat Bravo on the A27 near the village of Berwick, East Sussex. Llewelyn sustained massive internal injuries and was airlifted by helicopter to Eastbourne District General Hospital, where he died soon afterward at the age of 85. The driver of the Fiat, a 35-year-old man, was seriously injured but survived; a woman in her thirties was also in the Fiat and suffered minor injuries. An inquest recorded a verdict of accidental death.

Llewelyn's death occurred three weeks after the premiere of The World Is Not Enough. His funeral took place at St Mary the Virgin Church in Battle, Sussex on 6 January 2000, and was followed by a private cremation at Hastings Crematorium, with Llewelyn's ashes given to his family. A memorial service subsequently took place in London in March 2000. Speakers included his sons Justin and Ivor, as well as Roger Moore, who starred with Llewelyn in six of his seven Bond films

His widow, Pamela Mary Llewelyn, died in East Sussex in 2001, aged 88. His son, Justin Llewelyn, died in 2012, aged 59.

=== Legacy ===
In March 2026, Desmond Crescent and Llewelyn Road, two roads in Swindon, Wiltshire were named after Llewelyn, in reference to a nearby filming location for The World Is Not Enough.

== Partial filmography ==
=== Film ===
Year	Title	Role	Notes
1939	Ask a Policeman	Headless Coachman	Uncredited
1947	Captain Boycott	Gentleman on Train	Uncredited
1948	Hamlet	Extra	Uncredited
1949	Adam and Evelyne	Undetermined Supporting Role	Uncredited
1949	The Chiltern Hundreds	First Guardsman	Uncredited
1950	Guilt Is My Shadow	Pub customer	
1950	They Were Not Divided	'77 Jones	
1951	The Lavender Hill Mob	First Guardsman	Uncredited
1953	Valley of Song	Lloyd as Schoolmaster	
1953	Operation Diplomat	Police Constable at barrier	Uncredited
1953	Knights of the Round Table	A Herald	Uncredited
1958	A Night to Remember	Seaman at Steerage Gate	Uncredited
1958	Further Up the Creek	Chief Yeoman	Uncredited
1958	Corridors of Blood	Assistant at operations	Uncredited
1959	Sapphire	Police Constable	Uncredited
1960	Sword of Sherwood Forest	Wounded Fugitive	Uncredited
1961	Gorgo		Uncredited
1961	The Curse of the Werewolf	First Footman	Uncredited
1962	Only Two Can Play	Clergyman on Bus	Uncredited
1962	The Pirates of Blood River	Tom Blackthorne	Uncredited
1963	Cleopatra	Senator	Uncredited
1963	From Russia with Love	Major Boothroyd/Q	
1963	The Silent Playground	Dr. Green	
1964	Goldfinger	Q	
1965	The Amorous Adventures of Moll Flanders	Jailer	Uncredited
1965	Thunderball	Q	
1967	You Only Live Twice	Q	
1968	Chitty Chitty Bang Bang	Mr. Coggins	
1969	On Her Majesty's Secret Service	Q	
1971	Diamonds Are Forever	Q	
1974	The Man with the Golden Gun	Q	
1977	The Spy Who Loved Me	Q	
1979	The Golden Lady	Professor Dixon	
1979	Moonraker	Q	
1981	For Your Eyes Only	Q	
1983	Octopussy	Q	
1985	A View to a Kill	Q	
1987	The Living Daylights	Q	
1988	Prisoner of Rio	Commissioner Ingram	
1989	Licence to Kill	Q	
1992	October 32nd	Professor Mycroft	
1995	GoldenEye	Q	
1997	Tomorrow Never Dies	Q	
1999	The World Is Not Enough	Q	

=== Television ===
Year	Title	Role	Notes
1952	BBC Sunday Night Theatre	Pandimilgo	Episode: "The Wanderer"
1952	My Wife Jacqueline	Keith Appleyard	4 episodes
1958	The Adventures of Robin Hood	Two Fingers	Episode: "Little Mother"
1958	The Invisible Man	Det. Sergeant	Episode: "Blind Justice"
1959	ITV Play of the Week	John Redmond	Episode: "Parnell"
1959–1963	No Hiding Place	Various	2 episodes
1960–1968	Dixon of Dock Green	Various	3 episodes
1961–1967	Emergency Ward 10	Fergus de la Roux/Constable	3 episodes
1960	How Green Was My Valley	Mr. Evans	Episode: "Proposal and Disposal"
1960	Saturday Playhouse	Sergeant Harris	Episode: "Home and the Heart"
1964	The Sullavan Brothers	Colonel Barlow	Episode: "A Plea of Provocation"
1964	Gideon's Way	Commander - Traffic Division	Episode: "State Visit"
1965	Danger Man	Charles	Episode: "The Ubiquitous Mr. Lovegrove"
1967	Mickey Dunne	Lord Boutard	Episode: "The Hon. Bird"
1968	Virgin of the Secret Service	Count Kolinsky	Episode: "Russian Roundabout"
1968	City '68	Headmaster	Episode: "Where Did You Get That Hat?"
1970	Codename	Barrett	Episode: "A Walk with the Lions"
1971	Doomwatch	Thompson	Episode: "Flight into Yesterday"
1971	Softly, Softly: Task Force	Somers	Episode: "Something Big"
1971–1973	Follyfoot	The Colonel	
1973	Some Mothers Do 'Ave 'Em	Air Commodore Drew	Episode: "The R.A.F. Reunion"
1974	The Nine Tailors	Sir Charles Thorpe	Episode 1
1974	The Pallisers	Speaker	Part 23
1975	The Love School	Thomas Combe	Episode: "Seeking the Bubbles"
1975	A Man in the Zoo	Chairman	TV film
1976	Wodehouse Playhouse	Rev. Sidney Gooch	Episode: "Anselm Gets His Chance"
1976	The Onedin Line	President	Episode: "Loss of the Helen May"
1977	Eustace and Hilda	Sir John Staveley	Episode: "The Sixth Heaven"
1978	Wilde Alliance	Colonel Thripp	Episode: "Well Enough Alone"
1978	Lillie	Lord Dudley	Episode: "The Jersey Lily"
1979	Hazell	Bell	Episode: "Hazell and the Suffolk Ghost"
1979–1980	BBC2 Playhouse	Major Bill Whittal/Papa	2 episodes
1980	Dr. Jekyll and Mr. Hyde	Sir Danvers Carew	TV film
1981	The Life and Times of David Lloyd George	Lord Lansdowne	Episode: "No. 10"
1982	Play for Today	Official in Dream	Episode: "Soft Targets"

Preceded by Peter Burton	Q (in Eon James Bond films); 1963–1999	Succeeded by John Cleese
Records
Preceded by Johnny Weissmuller; Mickey Rooney	Playing the same role in most movies 17; 1999	Incumbent
