= The Big Business Lark =

- Genre: Sitcom
- Running time: 30 minutes
- Country of origin: United Kingdom
- Language: English
- Home station: BBC Radio 1; BBC Radio 2
- Syndicates: BBC Radio 4 Extra
- Starring: Jimmy Edwards; Frank Thornton
- Original release: 6 July – 28 September 1969
- No. of episodes: 13

The Big Business Lark is a radio comedy sitcom of partly satirical form broadcast in 1969. It stars Jimmy Edwards and Frank Thornton and was written by Lawrie Wyman as a spin-off from The Navy Lark, although no characters crossed over between the two shows. In a sense, the spin-off element was in The X Lark name format.

The show is set in the boardroom of fictional company British United Plastics, and concerns with the business machinations of the chairman, Sir Charles Boniface (Edwards), and his son and deputy chairman, Frank Boniface (Thornton). Plots included landing an order to provide the Red Army with plastic tents, a trip to America to make a good deal from another board member's mistake and an attempt to find a plastic novelty made by the firm for breakfast cereal boxes.

The main production ingredient of the company is a patented indestructible plastic named Polystumer. It can be molded for statues (Ep 11), used for novelty items (Ep 10), used as armour for tanks in which capacity it can repel mortar bombs (Ep 12) or used for plastic clothing (Ep 2) carpets, bathroom fixtures and fittings (Ep 1).

The comedy was more broad farce than subtle satire with Edwards playing a bluff, hard-drinking, chauvinist old rogue character and Thornton his more proper sidekick, analogous to the same role he played against Derek Francis in the other Navy Lark spin-off, The Embassy Lark.

Thirteen episodes were made and off-air recordings of all episodes are in circulation.

Gwen Cherrell played the secretary. The Times Obituary column reported her death on the 24th. of April, 2019, on the 18th. of May.

== Episodes ==
All episodes were written by Lawrie Wyman and produced by Alistair Scott Johnston. These episodes were broadcast on Sundays at 2:00pm on Radio 1 and Radio 2

None of these episodes originally had titles. The titles below are taken from the closing announcements of the episode.

No.	Title	Original release date	Recording date
1	"Leading You Through"	6 July 1969	15 June 1969
2	"Cruising on the River"	13 July 1969	22 June 1969
3	"Taking You Through"	20 July 1969	29 June 1969
4	"Disposing of a Relative"	27 July 1969	13 July 1969
5	"Playing Ducks"	3 August 1969	13 July 1969
6	"Taking Orders"	10 August 1969	27 July 1969
7	"Strike Breaking"	17 August 1969	3 August 1969
8	"Dining Out"	24 August 1969	10 August 1969
9	"Initiating You Through"	31 August 1969	24 August 1969
10	"Searching For Liberty"	7 September 1969	8 August 1969
11	"Contracting Out"	14 September 1969	7 September 1969
12	"Destructing"	21 September 1969	14 September 1969
13	"Advertising"	28 September 1969	21 September 1969
