= Frank Thornton =

English actor (1921–2013)

- Thornton as Captain Peacock in Are You Being Served?
- Born: Frank Thornton Ball; 15 January 1921; Dulwich, London, England
- Died: 16 March 2013 (aged 92); Barnes, London, England
- Occupation: Actor
- Years active: 1947–2013
- Spouse: Beryl Evans (m. 1945)
- Children: 1

Frank Thornton Ball (15 January 1921 – 16 March 2013), professionally known as Frank Thornton, was an English actor. He was best known for playing Captain Peacock in the television sitcom Are You Being Served? and its sequel Grace & Favour (also titled Are You Being Served? Again!) and as Herbert "Truly" Truelove in television sitcom Last of the Summer Wine.

== Early life ==
Frank Thornton Ball was born in Dulwich, London, the son of Rosina Mary (née Thornton) and William Ernest Ball. His father was an organist at St Stephen's Church, Sydenham Hill, where Frank learned to play the organ for a short while. Music proved too difficult for him, however, and he wanted to act from an early age.

His father, who worked in a bank, wanted him to get a "proper" job, so he began working in insurance after leaving Alleyn's School. He soon enrolled at a small acting school, the London School of Dramatic Art, and took evening classes. After two years working at the insurance company, he was invited to become a day student at the acting school and persuaded his father to finance his studies.

During the Second World War, Thornton was evacuated along with the drama school, and his first job was touring with four plays in Ireland, beginning in County Tipperary. After that he served as an airman in the Royal Air Force before ending the war as an officer. From the rank of leading aircraftman he was commissioned as a pilot officer on probation (emergency) on 1 December 1944. On 1 June 1945 his commission was confirmed and he was promoted to flying officer (war substantive). He was demobilised in 1947.

== Marriage ==
On 5 June 1945, Thornton married actress Beryl Evans in West Wickham. The couple had a daughter, Jane.

== Career ==
Almost immediately after demobilisation, Thornton joined a repertory company. He appeared in the farce The Party Spirit in the West End alongside Robertson Hare and Ralph Lynn. His first credited screen role was in the film Radio Cab Murder (1954). After working on stage and in a few films during the 1950s, he became a familiar face on British television, specialising in comedy but initially starred in the TV series William Tell as Heinburgher in episode 23, "The Surgeon". He also appeared frequently in early 1960s series such as The Four Just Men and Gideon's Way.

He was a regular on It's a Square World, and appeared in British sitcoms such as Hancock ("The Blood Donor", 1961), Steptoe and Son, Sykes, The Goodies and Love Thy Neighbour. He appeared in the Danger Man episodes "The Assassin" as Pepe and "Find and Return" as an airport official in 1961, and as a tailor in The Sentimental Agent episode 'Scroll of Islam' (1963). He worked with Dick Emery, Benny Hill, Frankie Howerd, Harry Worth, Reg Varney and Spike Milligan in their comedy shows and appeared in five episodes of Steptoe and Son during its first run from 1962 to 1965, and appeared in the film Steptoe and Son Ride Again (1973) and the 1973 television Christmas special, 'The Party'.

From 1966 to 1968, he starred in the BBC radio comedy The Embassy Lark, a spin-off of The Navy Lark. He appeared in at least one episode of The Navy Lark as CPO Nathaniel Pertwee, filling in for Jon Pertwee who was indisposed. He also appeared in at least one episode of The Navy Lark as his character from The Embassy Lark.

In 1969, he starred in The Big Business Lark which ran for one season of thirteen episodes. This was not strictly a spin-off from The Navy Lark, other than being another "Lark" written by Lawrie Wyman. He continued to appear in films, mostly comedies, during the 1960s and 1970s, including Carry On Screaming!, The Early Bird, The Big Job, The Bed Sitting Room, Up the Chastity Belt, Some Will, Some Won't, A Funny Thing Happened on the Way to the Forum and No Sex Please, We're British, as well as television sitcom spin-offs. He appeared in The Private Life of Sherlock Holmes (1970) as the one-armed doorman for the Diogenes Club. In 1974, he made a rare dramatic appearance as Prince Albert in the second episode of Fall of Eagles.

Thornton was best known for playing Captain Peacock in the long-running BBC comedy series Are You Being Served? from 1972 to 1985. He reprised his role for Grace & Favour from 1992 to 1993. In 1984 he starred as Sir John Treymane in the hit London musical Me and My Girl, earning rave reviews and an Olivier Award nomination. He also guest-starred in an episode of the BBC Radio series of Dad's Army entitled "Ten Seconds from Now" as the BBC producer Willoughby Maxwell-Troughton, who has to coordinate the chaotic platoon as it tries to broadcast to the nation in a morale-boosting Gang Show-style extravaganza.

In 1980, he joined John Cleese in the BBC Television Shakespeare production of The Taming of the Shrew. In the 1990s, he appeared as The Major-General (Stanley) in a production of The Pirates Of Penzance at the London Palladium.

Thornton also appeared in one of the BBC’s successful Saturday night shows Noel’s House Party as the long suffering neighbour or Noel Edmond’s. Appearing in 10 episodes between 1992-1994. His visits to Noel’s house in Crinkley bottom adding to the richness of this family entertainment hit.

In 1997, he took the role of Herbert "Truly" Truelove in Last of the Summer Wine, replacing Brian Wilde, who had suggested him for the role. He can also be seen in the film Gosford Park (2001) as Mr Burkett. Thornton was the subject of This Is Your Life in 1998, when he was surprised by Michael Aspel at Pinewood Studios.

== Death ==
Thornton died from natural causes peacefully in his sleep at his home in Barnes, London, on 16 March 2013, aged 92.

== Selected filmography ==
Year	Title	Role	Notes
1954	Radio Cab Murder	Inspector Finch	
1955	Stock Car	Doctor	
1955	Portrait of Alison	Police Photographer	
1956	Johnny, You're Wanted		
1956	Cloak Without Dagger	Mr. Markley	
1958	Battle of the V-1	British Scientist	Uncredited
1960	The Tell-Tale Heart	Barman	Uncredited
1961	The Impersonator	Police Sergeant	Uncredited
1961	Victim	George	Uncredited
1961	Tarnished Heroes	Trench Officer	
1961–1973	Comedy Playhouse	Various	7 episodes
1961–1973	Armchair Theatre	Various	4 episodes
1962	The Dock Brief	Photographer at Fowle Wedding	
1962	Doomsday at Eleven	BBC Announcer	
1964	The Wild Affair	Manager	
1964	The Comedy Man	Producer	Uncredited
1964	The Tomb of Ligeia	Peperel	
1965	The Big Job	Bank Official	
1965	The Early Bird	Drunken Doctor	
1965	The Murder Game	Radio Announcer	
1965	Gonks Go Beat	Mr. A and R	
1966	Carry On Screaming!	Mr. Jones	
1966	A Funny Thing Happened on the Way to the Forum	Roman Sentry #1	
1968	30 Is a Dangerous Age, Cynthia	Registrar	
1968	The Bliss of Mrs. Blossom	Factory Manager	
1968	A Flea in Her Ear	Charles	
1968	Till Death Us Do Part	Valuation Officer	
1969	The Assassination Bureau	Count Von Kissen	Uncredited
1969	Crooks and Coronets	Cyril	
1969	The Bed Sitting Room	The BBC	
1969	The Magic Christian	Police Inspector	Uncredited
1970	Some Will, Some Won't	Purvis	
1970	The Private Life of Sherlock Holmes	Porter	
1970	The Rise and Rise of Michael Rimmer	Tom Stoddart	
1970	All the Way Up	Mr. Driver	
1971	Up the Chastity Belt	Master of Ceremonies	
1972	Bless This House	Mr. Jones	
1972	That's Your Funeral	Town Clerk	
1972	Our Miss Fred	British Colonel	
1973	Steptoe and Son Ride Again	Mr. Russell	
1973	No Sex Please, We're British	Glass Shop Manager	
1973	Digby, the Biggest Dog in the World	Estate Agent	
1973	The Three Musketeers	Man in Small Carriage	Uncredited
1974	Keep It Up, Jack	Mr. Clarke	
1974	Vampira	Mr. King	
1975	Side by Side	Inspector Crumb	
1975	Spanish Fly	Dr. Johnson	
1976	The Bawdy Adventures of Tom Jones	Whitlow	
1977	Are You Being Served?	Captain Peacock	
2001	Gosford Park	Mr. Burkett	
2012	Run for Your Wife	Man Getting Off Bus	

== Television ==
Year	Title	Role	Notes
1950	Sunday Night Theatre	Sailor	Episode: "The Secret Sharer"
1957	Dixon of Dock Green	PC Cox	Episode: "The New Skipper"
1958–1959	The Adventures of William Tell	Various	3 episodes
1959–1960	The Four Just Men	Various	12 episodes
1960-1963	It's a Square World	Various	
1961	Danger Man	Pepe/Police Captain	2 episodes
1961	The Avengers	Sir William Bonner	Episode: "Death on the Slipway"
1961	The Rag Trade	Mr. Davis	Episode: "Early Start"
1961	Citizen James	Ministry Agent	2 episodes
1962–1964	ITV Play of the Week	Various	4 episodes
1962–1973	Steptoe and Son	Various	5 episodes
1965	Emergency Ward 10	John Ross	5 episodes
1966	Coronation Street	Danny Roach	1 episode
1966	Lucy in London	Passport Official	TV special
1968	The Champions	Clerk	Episode: "The Night People"
1970	The Morecambe & Wise Show	Richards	1 episode
1970	The Troubleshooters	TV Interviewer	Episode: "Camelot on a Clear Day"
1970	Here Come the Double Deckers!	Mr. Parsons	Episode: "Robbie the Robot"
1971–1977	The Goodies	Waiter/Master of Ceremonies	2 episodes
1972	Love Thy Neighbour	Barman	Episode: "Refused a Drink"
1972	Sykes	Dr. Taplow	Episode: "Dream"
1972–1985	Are You Being Served?	Captain Peacock	
1974	Crown Court	Professor McIver	Episode: "A Case of Murder Part 2"
1974	Fall of Eagles	Prince Albert	Episode: "The English Princess"
1975	Whodunnit?	Gerald Harvey	Episode: "Nothing to Declare"
1976	The New Avengers	Roland	Episode: "House of Cards"
1978	BBC Television Shakespeare	Gremio	Episode: The Taming of the Shrew
1984–1987	The Sooty Show	Various	3 episodes
1989	Great Expectations	Mr. Trabb	2 episodes
1989	The BFG	Mr. Tibbs	TV film
1992–1993	Grace & Favour	Captain Peacock	
1997–2010	Last of the Summer Wine	Truly	Seasons 19-31
2001	Casualty	Edward Gutheridge	Episode: "Heroes and Villains"
2003	Doctors	Gerard Mears	Episode: "A Soldier's Lot"
2004	Holby City	Douglas Archer	Episode: "We'll Meet Again"
