= Reedham Ferry =

Ferry in Norfolk, England

Coordinates: 52.557853°N 1.550447°E

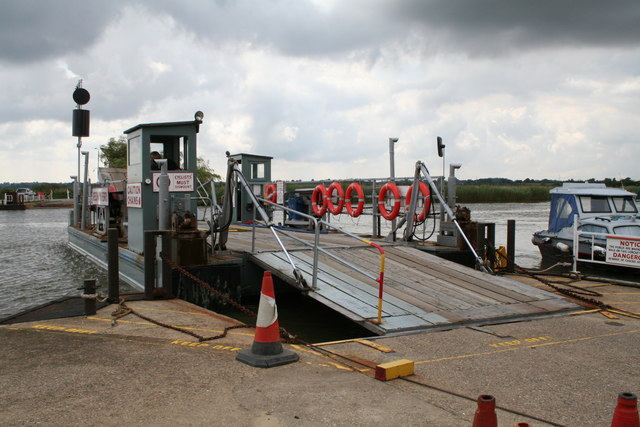
Reedham Ferry

Reedham Ferry is a vehicular chain ferry across the River Yare in the English county of Norfolk, in the Broads. The ferry crosses the river near the village of Reedham and is the only crossing of the Yare between the bridge carrying the A47 on the eastern outskirts of Norwich and Great Yarmouth, saving users a journey of over 30 miles. The ferry is also the only remaining vehicle ferry in Norfolk. The current ferryboat was built in 1983 and can carry three cars at a time. Reedham Ferry is also the name of an inn standing adjacent to the ferry on the northern bank.
