= Alastair Scott Johnston =

British radio producer (1917–1992)

Alastair Ninian Scott Johnston (10 November 1917 – 7 October 1992) was a British radio producer working for the BBC, mainly on comedy programmes.

Born in London, he started work in a bank before successfully applying for a junior post at the BBC. His first job was in creating and using sound effects for radio shows. During the Second World War he served with distinction in the Grenadier Guards in Burma and India, and on returning to Britain became a producer in the Variety department at the BBC. His early productions included All Star Bill, Variety Playhouse, and Floggit's. He helped launch the careers of such performers as Tony Hancock, Anthony Newley, Semprini, Frankie Howerd, Leslie Phillips, and Ronnie Barker. His longest-lasting role was as producer of The Navy Lark, which he developed with writer Lawrie Wyman, and which ran from 1959 until 1977.

He was married twice. He died at his home, "Dumble Dore", in Stanford Dingley, Berkshire, in 1992 at the age of 74.
