= Casanova '73 =

1973 British TV series

- DVD cover
- Genre: Sitcom
- Directed by: Harold Snoad
- Starring: Leslie Phillips; Jan Holden
- Country of origin: United Kingdom
- Original language: English
- No. of series: 1
- No. of episodes: 7

Production
- Producer: Harold Snoad
- Running time: 30 minutes

Original release
- Network: BBC1
- Release: 13 September – 29 October 1973

Casanova '73 is a British sitcom broadcast on BBC1 in September and October 1973. Written by Ray Galton and Alan Simpson, the series starred Leslie Phillips as wealthy womaniser Henry Newhouse (the English translation of "casa nova").

== Background and plot ==
Casanova '73 followed an episode of Galton and Simpson Comedy ("The Suit", 1969) for London Weekend Television in which Phillips played Howard Butler, a philandering businessman whose clothes are stolen whilst he is in bed at his secretary's home. As with this series, it also featured Jan Holden as his wife. Casanova '73 was specially written for Phillips.

Henry Newhouse has a successful career in public relations. Although happily married to Carol, he is a compulsive philanderer and leads a double life. His relationships invariably backfire and lead to farcical situations.

== Cast ==
- Leslie Phillips as Henry Newhouse
- Jan Holden as Carol Newhouse
- Yolande Turner as Connie Langham
- Elvi Hale as Muriel
- Cyd Hayman as Miss Dropmore
- Madeline Smith as Tessa Finlay
- Josephine Tewson as Mrs Kershaw
- Ronald Adam as Dr Spartforth
- Astrid Frank as Miss West Germany
- Maureen Lipman as Gloria
- Michael Knowles as Judge
- Janet Davies as Wife
- Directed and Produced by Harold Snoad

== Reception ==
Casanova '73 was poorly received by the critics. Stanley Reynolds in The Times wrote that Phillips character "gets caught in the wrong beds in all the right comic places but it still does not seem to work. The script is either too laborious and slow or the jokes are too old and feeble." Mary Whitehouse, of the National Viewers' and Listeners' Association and others objected to its risque contents. The complaints led to the programme being moved to a later time slot. The first two episodes aired at 8.00pm on Thursdays and the final five on Mondays at 9.25pm. This decision appears to have been taken close to transmission, as Radio Times, published a week in advance, still had the third episode as due to air pre-watershed, but The Times, published on the day of broadcast, listed the series as already having been moved in the schedule. The quiz show Mastermind replaced it in the slot, helping it to become a hit.

== Episodes ==
| No. | Title | Original release date |
|---|---|---|
| 1 | "Episode One" | 13 September 1973 |
When Henry receives letters at home from a girlfriend he feigns sickness so he can intercept the postman each morning. However, when the letters suddenly stop arriving he rejoices but wonders why.
| 2 | "Episode Two" | 20 September 1973 |
After believing he has been spotted by a neighbour having a romantic meal with another woman, Henry does what he mistakenly believes he needs to do to ensure her silence.
| 3 | "Episode Three" | 24 September 1973 |
Henry's son is about to be expelled from his boarding school (formerly Henry's too) for taking inappropriate photos of his maths mistress.
| 4 | "Episode Four" | 1 October 1973 |
Henry's business partner Arthur believes his wife is having an affair and he hides a tape recorder in their flat to catch her in the act.
| 5 | "Episode Five" | 15 October 1973 |
Henry organises a beauty contest, Miss European Dairy Produce and gets involved with Miss West Germany.
| 6 | "Episode Six" | 22 October 1973 |
Henry gets a proposition such that he fails to rise to the challenge but suspects that Carol has had no such scruples about what she has been offered.
| 7 | "Episode Seven" | 29 October 1973 |
A worn out Henry turns to one of his regular girlfriends for assistance. However, when her wrestling husband returns home early Henry has to hide in the wardrobe.

== Home release ==
All seven episodes of Casanova '73 were released on DVD by Acorn Media UK on 8 October 2012.
