= Stephen Murray (actor) =

British actor (1912–1983)

- Born: Stephen Umfreville Hay Murray; 6 September 1912; Partney, Lincolnshire, England
- Died: 31 March 1983 (aged 70); London, England
- Education: RADA
- Occupation: Actor
- Spouse: Joan Alestha Butterfield (m.1937)
- Children: 1

Stephen Umfreville Hay Murray (6 September 1912 – 31 March 1983) was an English cinema, radio, theatre and television actor.

== Background and education ==
A member of Clan Murray headed by the Duke of Atholl, he was born in Partney, Lincolnshire, the son of the Reverend Charles Murray, Rector of Kirby Knowle, North Riding of Yorkshire, and Mabel (née Umfreville). He was the great-grandson of the Right Reverend George Murray, Bishop of Rochester, while the diplomat Sir Ralph Murray was his elder brother. He was educated at Brentwood School, Essex and the Royal Academy of Dramatic Art, London. He was also the great-uncle of the comedian Al Murray.

== Acting career ==
Murray found his greatest fame as the new Number 1, later promoted to Lieutenant Commander in The Navy Lark on BBC Radio. His film debut was as the second police officer who interrupts an amorous Eliza and Freddy (Wendy Hiller and David Tree) in Pygmalion (1938). He was Gladstone to John Gielgud's Disraeli in The Prime Minister in 1941. He played Dr. Stephan Petrovitch in the 1943 Ealing war film Undercover. Among his other larger film roles were Uncle Henry in London Belongs to Me (1948, heavily made-up to look several decades older) and the lead in Terence Fisher's Four Sided Triangle (1953). He once again appeared under heavy make-up as the elderly Dr Manette in A Tale of Two Cities (1958).

Murray made his stage debut at Stratford-upon-Avon in 1933, and he played such parts as Seyton in Macbeth, among smaller roles. He later did seasons at the Malvern Festival and at the Birmingham Repertory Theatre, where he played Hamlet. He worked at the Old Vic in London with Laurence Olivier and Tyrone Guthrie. He also played at the Open Air Theatre in Regent's Park, and in the West End. At the Westminster Theatre in 1940 he portrayed the title character in John Drinkwater's Abraham Lincoln. He was in many of the plays of George Bernard Shaw, and he did later engagements at the Mermaid Theatre in London and at Stratford, Ontario, Canada. On television he played in such programmes as Dr. Finlay's Casebook, and had a leading role as Svengali. In 1952 he returned to the Old Vic to play King Lear, and toured Europe in that production. Several years later he also played Lear on radio.

Radio became one of Murray's most triumphant acting areas, with appearances in over 300 plays. He played Macbeth in 1949 with Flora Robson, a month after playing the part on television (with Ruth Lodge), so different were the two medium's audiences deemed to be. He played the part again on radio in 1960. He was a fine Leontes in The Winter's Tale in 1951 with Elspeth March and Fay Compton, and again in 1966 with Rachel Gurney and Edith Evans. He played Shakespeare's Timon of Athens both in 1961 and in 1975. In 1964, he played the title role in the monumental BBC Radio production of Marlowe's Tamburlaine with Sheila Allen as Zenocrate with Timothy West, Andrew Sachs, Joss Ackland, Gabriel Woolf, Bruce Condell and other leading Shakespearian actors of the day. He did two versions of the BBC radio epic The Rescue by Edward Sackville-West, where he played Odysseus. Other classic '50s roles included Marlowe's Doctor Faustus, John Gabriel Borkman and Brand as well as Calderon's The Mayor of Zalamea. However, his longest running part was that of "No 1" in The Navy Lark in which he starred from 1960 to 1977.

In 1970 Murray played alongside Glenda Jackson in the BBC drama series Elizabeth R about the life and reign of Queen Elizabeth I. In this he played Sir Francis Walsingham, head of Elizabeth's secret service, and a noted Puritan, whose work exposed the Babington Plot which led to the trial and execution of Mary, Queen of Scots. Even in the 1970s he enjoyed the difficult roles, like August Strindberg's To Damascus with Zena Walker.

His expressive voice was often anguished and uncertain in his roles, so he was ideal for A Hospital Case by Dino Buzzati, a play which Albert Camus had translated and adapted for the Paris stage. He also did new radio work like Peter Tegel's Rocklife. In 1970 he was the old Prince Bolkonsky in BBC radio's War and Peace. He tried his hand at science fiction in radio's The Tor Sands Experience by Bruce Stewart.

== Personal life ==
Murray married Joan Alestha, daughter of John Joseph Moy Butterfield, in 1937. He died in London on 31 March 1983, aged 70. Their daughter and only child Amanda appeared in several episodes of The Navy Lark with her father.

== Filmography ==
Year	Title	Role	Notes
1938	Pygmalion	Second Policeman	Film debut
1941	The Prime Minister	Mr. W.E. Gladstone	
1942	The Next of Kin	Mr. Barratt	
1943	Undercover	Dr. Stephan Petrovitch	
1947	Master of Bankdam	Zebediah Crowther	
1948	My Brother Jonathan	Dr. Craig	
1948	London Belongs to Me	Uncle Henry	
1949	Silent Dust	Robert Rawley	
1949	For Them That Trespass	Christopher Drew	
1949	Alice in Wonderland	Lewis Carroll / Knave of Hearts	Voice
1949	Now Barabbas	Chaplain	
1950	The Magnet	Dr. Brent	
1951	West of England	Narrator	Short Board of Trade film. Script by Laurie Lee
1952	24 Hours of a Woman's Life	Father Andre Benoit	
1953	Four Sided Triangle	Bill	
1954	The Stranger's Hand	British Consul in Venice	
1955	The End of the Affair	Father Crompton	
1956	Guilty?	Summers	
1956	The Door in the Wall	Sir Frank Wallace	Short
1957	At the Stroke of Nine	Stephen Garrett	
1958	A Tale of Two Cities	Dr. Manette	
1959	The Nun's Story	Chaplain (Father Andre)	
1963	Master Spy	Boris Turganev	Final film
1971	Elizabeth R	Walsingham	Miniseries
1977	Hitler: A Career	Narrator (English Version)	
1981	Lady Killers	Archibald Bodkin	Episode: My Perfect Husband
