= Leslie Phillips =

British actor (1924–2022)

Leslie Phillips CBE
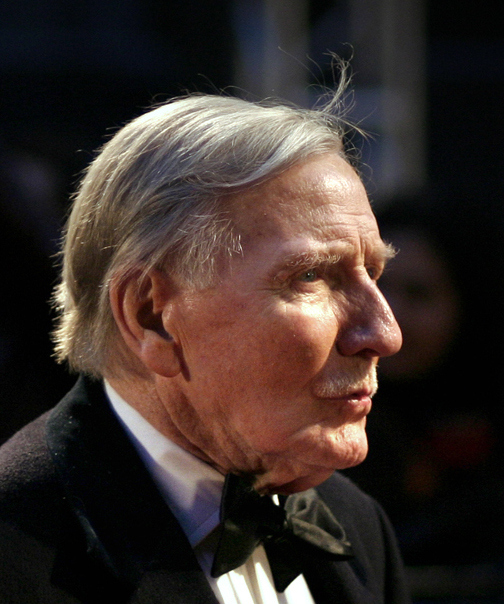
- Phillips in 2007
- Born: Leslie Samuel Phillips; 20 April 1924; Tottenham, Middlesex, England
- Died: 7 November 2022 (aged 98); Maida Vale, London, England
- Resting place: Chingford Mount Cemetery, London, England
- Education: Italia Conti Academy of Theatre Arts
- Occupation: Actor
- Years active: 1937–2015
- Known for: Carry On; Gex: Enter the Gecko; Harry Potter
- Spouses: Penelope Bartley (m. 1948; div. 1965); Angela Scoular (m. 1982; died 2011); Zara Carr (m. 2013)
- Children: 4

Leslie Samuel Phillips (20 April 1924 – 7 November 2022) was an English actor. He achieved prominence in the 1950s, playing smooth, upper-class comic roles utilising his "Ding dong" and "Hello" catchphrases. He appeared in the Carry On and Doctor in the House film series as well as the long-running BBC radio comedy series The Navy Lark. On the stage, Phillips was nominated for the Laurence Olivier Award for Best Comedy Performance in 1977. In his later career, Phillips took on dramatic parts including a BAFTA-nominated role alongside Peter O'Toole in Venus (2006). He provided the voice of the Sorting Hat in three of the Harry Potter films.

== Early life ==
Leslie Samuel Phillips was born in Tottenham on 20 April 1924, the third child of Cecelia Margaret (née Newlove) and Frederick Samuel Phillips, who worked at Glover and Main, manufacturers of cookers in Edmonton. Phillips described his street as "beyond the sonic reach of the Bow Bells but within the general footprint of cockneydom." In 1931, the family moved to Chingford, where Phillips attended Larkswood Primary School. Consequently, Phillips has described himself as both a cockney and an Essex boy. In 1935, his father died at 44, having suffered from a weak heart and oedema brought on by the "filthy, sulphurous" air of the factory.

After his father's death, Phillips was sent to the Italia Conti Academy at his mother's insistence. There, he attended drama, dance and notably elocution to lose his cockney accent; at the time, a regional accent was considered an impediment to an aspiring actor. Phillips took time to refine his Received Pronunciation accent, and later declared that "the biggest elocution lessons came from mixing with people who sounded right, people in theatrical circles and in the officers' mess during the war." He left school at 14 in 1938.

== Career ==
=== Early work ===
Phillips made his stage debut in 1937 as a wolf in Peter Pan alongside Anna Neagle at the London Palladium. In the 1938–39 season, he was promoted to the role of John Napoleon Darling, alongside Jean Forbes-Robertson as Peter and Seymour Hicks as Captain Hook. Acting allowed Phillips to earn extra money for his family, who had struggled financially after his father's death.

Phillips made his first film appearance in the 1938 musical comedy Lassie from Lancashire. He made further uncredited appearances in Climbing High (1938) and The Mikado (1939), among the earliest films made at Pinewood Studios. Upon the 70th anniversary of the studios in 2006, Phillips considered himself one of the earliest actors to have worked there still alive and working. A minor part in Ealing Studios' The Proud Valley (1940) afforded Phillips the chance to work alongside Paul Robeson, whom he greatly admired.

In the early years of the Second World War, Phillips worked in the West End for Binkie Beaumont and H. M. Tennent. The shows were frequently interrupted by air-raid sirens and Phillips later recalled that "audiences would evaporate and head for cellars or Underground stations". Called up to the British Army in 1942, Phillips rose to the rank of lance-bombardier in the Royal Artillery. Due to his acquired upper class accent, Phillips was selected for officer training at Catterick and duly commissioned as a second lieutenant in the Royal Artillery in 1943. He was transferred to the Durham Light Infantry in 1944 but was later declared unfit for service just before D-Day after being diagnosed with a neurological condition that caused partial paralysis. He was initially sent to a psychiatric hospital in error before moving to the correct facility for treatment.

Demobbed as a lieutenant in December 1944, Phillips's acting career initially took in "the murkiest rat-infested old playhouses and music halls in the north of England". He resumed his career as a film player, making uncredited appearances in Anna Karenina and Powell and Pressburger's The Red Shoes (both 1948). His first lead role in a television serial was in the sitcom My Wife Jacqueline (1952).

His big break in the films was in the Gene Kelly musical Les Girls (1957). Although the film was a critical success, he decided against a move to Hollywood, in part as he considered himself primarily a theatre actor and did not want to become "the poor man's David Niven". He began appearing in character roles in British comedy films including Brothers in Law and The Smallest Show on Earth (both 1957). In 1959, Phillips was cast in a minor role as Jack Bell in Carry On Nurse, the second in the Carry On film series. The character's exclamation of "Ding dong" in the film became a popular catchphrase for Phillips. He became strongly associated with smooth-talking, libidinous roles, and his catchphrases "Ding dong", "I say" and "Hello" entered common usage in the United Kingdom. Phillips cemented his image in two further Carry On films, Carry On Teacher (1959) and Carry On Constable (1960) before telling producer Peter Rogers that he did not wish to appear in any more. Carry On director Gerald Thomas cast Phillips in several other comedy films; Please Turn Over (1959) features Phillips as Dr. Henry Manners, a respectable family doctor portrayed as a philanderer in a book written by 17-year-old Jo Halliday (Julia Lockwood), while he plays father David Robinson opposite Geraldine McEwan in No Kidding (1960).

Between 1959 and 1977, Phillips became familiar on radio, as Sub-Lieutenant Phillips in the comedy The Navy Lark alongside Jon Pertwee and Ronnie Barker. He also appeared in the film version of The Navy Lark (1959), the only cast member of the radio series to do so.

In 1960, Phillips was cast in Doctor in Love, the fourth film in the Doctor comedy series and the first without Dirk Bogarde. The cast included James Robertson Justice with whom Phillips made a number of movies. They appeared in two further installments, Doctor in Clover (1966) and Doctor in Trouble (1970). Phillips appeared in several comedy films directed by Ken Annakin, often cast alongside his Doctor co-star James Robertson Justice, including Very Important Person (1961), Raising the Wind (1961) and Crooks Anonymous (1962).

In 1962, Phillips and Justice starred with Stanley Baxter in Annakin's The Fast Lady, one of Britain's biggest box office hits of the year. A loose sequel, Father Came Too!, followed in 1964.

During the 1960s, Phillips appeared on television in two plays penned by the comedy writing team Galton and Simpson; "Impasse", broadcast as part of Comedy Playhouse in 1963, and "The Suit", a 1969 episode of The Galton & Simpson Comedy. The latter was developed into a full series four years later, Casanova '73, starring Phillips as compulsive philanderer Henry Newhouse. The programme was poorly received and attracted criticism from Mary Whitehouse of the National Viewers' and Listeners' Association for its risque content.

=== Later work ===
By the early 1980s, Phillips considered his suave and lecherous roles to be "a bit of a rut" and looked to branch out into dramatic roles. A relatively minor part in Out of Africa (1985) facilitated a larger role in Steven Spielberg's Empire of the Sun (1987). To play an emaciated prisoner of war in the film, Phillips lost more than two stone. He became busy as a character actor in both stage and television productions including Scandal (1989) and Lara Croft: Tomb Raider (2001). In 1992, he returned to the Carry On series in the poorly received Carry On Columbus. Phillips also provided the voice for the Sorting Hat in the Harry Potter films, appearing in Harry Potter and the Philosopher's Stone (2001), Harry Potter and the Chamber of Secrets (2002) and the final film, Harry Potter and the Deathly Hallows – Part 2 (2011).

Phillips appeared in British television sitcoms including Honey for Tea with Felicity Kendal and appeared in guest roles in popular series such as The Bill, Holby City and Midsomer Murders. In 2006, he played veteran actor Ian alongside Peter O'Toole in Hanif Kureishi's film Venus. For this role, he was nominated for a BAFTA for Best Supporting Actor in 2007. Phillips's autobiography, Hello, was published by Orion in 2006.

He was appointed Officer of the Order of the British Empire (OBE) in the 1998 Birthday Honours and was promoted to Commander of the Order of the British Empire (CBE) in the 2008 New Year Honours.

In 2012, Phillips voiced the audiobook edition of the legal thriller Chequered Justice, by John Bartlett (ISBN 9780956910486).

Phillips, in conjunction with Jules Williams and Back Door Productions, co-produced the Sky Arts series Living The Life which ran for three series, ending in 2013.

He continued to act until 2012 and continued to make television appearances until 2015 when he was interviewed on the BBC One programme VE Day: Remembering Victory.

== Personal life, illness and death ==
Phillips married his first wife, actress Penelope Bartley (1925–1981), on 30 May 1948. The couple had four children. In 1962, Phillips began a relationship with actress Caroline Mortimer, daughter of writer Penelope Mortimer and stepdaughter of John Mortimer, who was an understudy in a stage play in which Phillips starred. Phillips and Bartley separated at that point and were divorced in 1965.

After his relationship with Mortimer ended, Phillips embarked on a relationship with Australian actress Vicki Luke, with whom he lived for approximately three years.

Phillips moved in with actress Angela Scoular in 1977, at which time she was pregnant by another actor. He raised her son as his own. While on tour in Australia in 1981, he was notified that Bartley had died in a fire. Phillips chose to continue in the production and did not attend her funeral. He later acknowledged that his family had never forgiven him for this decision.

Phillips married Scoular in 1982. In 1992 Scoular, who suffered from bipolar disorder, attempted suicide but was not sectioned. Scoular died on 11 April 2011 after drinking a corrosive drain cleaner and suffering unsurvivable 40% burns to her throat, body and dietary tract. She had suffered from bowel cancer and although was later declared cancer-free, she became anxious that the cancer had returned. Phillips was too ill to attend the inquest into Scoular's death three months later. The coroner ruled that Scoular's death was not suicide, but rather that she had "killed herself while the balance of her mind was disturbed".

Phillips received the Freedom of the City of London on 16 November 2010. Phillips was a supporter of Tottenham Hotspur, and made an appearance as part of the half-time entertainment during the team's home match against Swansea City on 1 April 2012.

On 20 December 2013, at the age of 89, Phillips married his third wife, Zara Carr.

Phillips suffered two strokes six months apart at the age of 90. After a long illness, he died from bronchopneumonia in his sleep at his home in Maida Vale, London, on 7 November 2022, aged 98.

== Filmography ==
=== Film ===
Year	Title	Role	Notes	Ref.
1938	Lassie from Lancashire	Small role	Uncredited	
1938	The Citadel	Small role	Uncredited	
1938	Climbing High	Small role	Uncredited	
1939	The Mikado	Boy	Uncredited	
1939	The Four Feathers	Boy at Parade	Uncredited	
1940	The Proud Valley	Small Role	Uncredited	
1940	The Thief of Bagdad	Urchin	Uncredited	
1948	Anna Karenina	Small Role	Uncredited	
1948	The Red Shoes	Audience Member	Uncredited	
1949	Train of Events	Fireman		
1950	The Woman with No Name	Officer		
1951	Pool of London	Harry		
1951	The Galloping Major	Reporter	Uncredited	
1952	The Sound Barrier	Controller	Uncredited	
1953	Time Bomb	Police Sergeant	Uncredited	
1953	The Limping Man	Cameron		
1954	You Know What Sailors Are	Embassy Secretary	Uncredited	
1955	As Long as They're Happy	Box Office Manager		
1955	Value for Money	Robjohns		
1956	The Gamma People	Howard Meade		
1956	The Big Money	Receptionist		
1957	The Barretts of Wimpole Street	Harry Bevan		
1957	Brothers in Law	Shop Assistant		
1957	The Smallest Show on Earth	Robin Carter		
1957	High Flight	Squadron Leader Blake		
1957	Les Girls	Sir Gerald Wren		
1957	Just My Luck	Hon. Richard Lumb		
1958	I Was Monty's Double	Major Tennant		
1959	The Navy Lark	Lt. Pouter		
1959	The Man Who Liked Funerals	Simon Hurd		
1959	The Angry Hills	Ray Taylor		
1959	Carry On Nurse	Jack Bell		
1959	Carry On Teacher	Alistair Grigg		
1959	The Night We Dropped a Clanger	Squadron Leader Thomas		
1959	Please Turn Over	Dr. Henry Manners		
1959	Ferdinando I, re di Napoli	Pat		
1959	This Other Eden	Crispin Brown		
1960	Inn for Trouble	John Belcher		
1960	Carry On Constable	PC Tom Potter		
1960	Doctor in Love	Dr. Tony Burke		
1960	Watch Your Stern	Lt. Cmdr. Bill Fanshawe		
1960	No Kidding	David Robinson		
1961	A Weekend with Lulu	Timothy Gray		
1961	Very Important Person	Flying Officer Jimmy Cooper DFC		
1961	Raising the Wind	Mervyn Hughes		
1962	Crooks Anonymous	Dandy Forsdyke		
1962	In the Doghouse	Jimmy Fox-Upton		
1962	The Longest Day	RAF Officer Mac		
1962	The Fast Lady	Freddie Fox		
1964	Father Came Too!	Roddy Chipfield		
1965	You Must Be Joking!	Young Husband		
1966	Doctor in Clover	Dr. Gaston Grimsdyke		
1967	Maroc 7	Raymond Lowe		
1970	Some Will, Some Won't	Simon Russell		
1970	Doctor in Trouble	Dr. Tony Burke		
1971	The Magnificent Seven Deadly Sins	Dickie		
1973	Not Now, Darling	Gilbert Bodley		
1974	Don't Just Lie There, Say Something!	Sir William Mainwaring-Brown		
1975	Spanish Fly	Mike Scott		
1976	Not Now, Comrade	Commander Rimmington		
1985	Out of Africa	Sir Joseph		
1987	Empire of the Sun	Maxton		
1989	Scandal	Lord Astor		
1990	Mountains of the Moon	Mr. Arundell		
1991	King Ralph	Gordon Halliwell		
1992	Carry On Columbus	King Ferdinand		
1996	August	Professor Alexander Blathwaite		
1997	Caught in the Act	Sydney Fisher		
1997	The Jackal	Woolburton		
1998	The Orgasm Raygun	The Inventor's Voiceover	Voice	
2000	Saving Grace	Vicar		
2001	Lara Croft: Tomb Raider	Wilson		
2001	Harry Potter and the Philosopher's Stone	Sorting Hat	Voice	
2002	Thunderpants	Judge		
2002	Harry Potter and the Chamber of Secrets	Sorting Hat	Voice	
2003	Collusion	Herbert Ames		
2004	Millions	Leslie Phillips		
2004	Churchill: The Hollywood Years	Lord W'ruff		
2005	Colour Me Kubrick	Freddie		
2006	Venus	Ian		
2008	Is There Anybody There?	Reg		
2011	Late Bloomers	Leo		
2011	Harry Potter and the Deathly Hallows – Part 2	Sorting Hat	Voice	
2012	After Death	Jeremiah Jones	Final acting role	
2022	Darkheart Manor	Jeremiah Jones	Archive footage only	

=== Selected television ===
Year	Title	Role	Notes	Ref.
1948	Morning Departure	Stoker Snipe	TV film	
1952	My Wife Jacqueline	Tom Bridger	All 6 episodes	
1955-1960	The Adventures of Robin Hood	Various	4 episodes	
1958	The Invisible Man	Sparrow	Episode: "Blind Justice"	
1963	Comedy Playhouse	Mr. Ferris	Episode: "Impasse"	
1963	Our Man at St. Mark's	Reverend Andrew Parker	7 episodes	
1969	The Galton & Simpson Comedy	Howard	Episode: "The Suit"	
1970	The Culture Vultures	Dr. Michael Cunningham	All 5 episodes	
1972	Father, Dear Father	Basil	Episode: "Unaccustomed as I Am"	
1973	Casanova '73	Henry Newhouse	Miniseries	
1979	The Lion, the Witch & the Wardrobe	Mr. Tumnus	Voice; TV film	
1985	Mr. Palfrey of Westminster	Rupert Styles	Episode: "Return to Sender"	
1987	Super Gran	P.O.W.	Episode: "Supergran and the Birthday Dambuster"	
1988	Rumpole of the Bailey	Boxey Horne	Episode: "Rumpole and Portia"	
1990	The Comic Strip Presents...	Sir Horace Cutler/Dean	2 episodes, including "GLC: The Carnage Continues..."	
1990–1991	Chancer	James Blake	18 episodes	
1990	Life After Life	Wing Commander Boyle	TV pilot	
1994	Bermuda Grace	Sir Philip Harding	TV film	
1994	Honey for Tea	Sir Dickie Hobhouse	Miniseries	
1994	The House of Windsor	Lord Montague Bermondsey	Miniseries	
1994	Love on a Branch Line	Lord Flamborough	Miniseries	
1994	The Ruth Rendell Mysteries	Justin Whittaker	3 episodes	
1996	The Canterville Ghost	George, Lord Canterville	TV film	
1999	Dalziel and Pascoe	James Westropp	Episode: "Recalled to Life"	
2000	Take a Girl Like You	Lord Archie Edgerstone	Part 3	
2001–2004	Revolver	The Safecracker	7 episodes	
2001	Sword of Honour	Gervase Crouchback	TV film	
2003	Midsomer Murders	Major Godfrey Teal	Episode: "Painted in Blood"	
2006	Agatha Christie's Marple	Sir Philip Starke	Episode: "By the Pricking of My Thumbs"	
2006	Heartbeat	Denzil Witty	Episode: "Risky Business"	
2006	The Catherine Tate Show	Teddy Morris	Episode: "Mum, I'm Gay"	
2006	Walking with Shadows	Mr. Barness	TV film	
2007	The Last Detective	Alistair Robertson	Episode: "The Dead Peasants Society"	
2008	Harley Street	Dudley Grainger	Episode: #1.2	
2009	Things Talk	Grandfather Clock	Voice; TV film	
2015	VE Day: Remembering Victory	Himself – Interviewee	Final television appearance	

=== Selected radio ===
- The Navy Lark (1959–1977)
- Three Men in a Boat (1962)
- The TV Lark (1963)

=== Other voice work ===
- Voice of Gex in the European release of Gex: Enter the Gecko
- Voice of cat in Iams advertising
- Voice of the captain of the Virgin Atlantic safety video (1996–2004)
- English voice of the Sorting Hat in Harry Potter and the Forbidden Journey
