= Thurston Hopkins =

British photojournalist (1913–2014)

Godfrey Thurston Hopkins (16 April 1913 – 27 October 2014), known as Thurston Hopkins, was a British Picture Post photojournalist and a centenarian.

== Education ==
Thurston Hopkins was born on 16 April 1913 in south London, son of Sybil (née Bateley) and Robert Thurston Hopkins (1884–1958), a bank cashier and prolific author of topographical works, ghost stories, and biographies of British writers Oscar Wilde, H. G. Wells and Rudyard Kipling. The family lived in Sussex and Godfrey, who came to be known by part of his last name (Thurston) was educated at St Joseph's Salesian school at Burwash, near Kipling's home in East Sussex, and at Montpelier college, Brighton.

== Early work ==
Thurston Hopkins studied under Morgan Rendle at Brighton College of Art in graphic art and taught himself photography, his pictures being used for some of his father's books. He found employment with a publisher adding decorative frames to portraits of Edward VIII, which the King's abdication on 10 December 1936 brought to an abrupt end. With the shift to photography from illustration amongst newspaper publishers, he joined the PhotoPress Agency. They lent him his first camera; a Goerz Anschutz which he found cumbersome. It was not until serving in the RAF Photographic Unit during the Second World War in Italy and the Middle East from 1940 that he acquired a more portable 35 mm format Leica which apart from occasional use of a Rolleiflex, he continued to prefer for the rest of his career.

== Picture Post ==
After being demobilised, Thurston Hopkins hitchhiked around Europe for a while taking photographs. Back in England he worked for Camera Press, the agency founded in London in 1947 by Tom Blau. Having seen issues of Picture Post at military posts everywhere during his service he developed a keen ambition to work for this.

Founded in 1938 and funded by publisher Edward Hulton, the magazine's first editor was Hungarian émigré Stefan Lorant (1901–1997) assisted by Tom Hopkinson (1905–1990), who took over as editor from 1940. The image-centric format, left-leaning and reasonably-priced publication was highly successful and circulation soon rose to over a million. Its photographers, including Bert Hardy, Kurt Hutton, Humphrey Spender, Leonard McCombe, John Chillingworth and Bill Brandt, went out with the writers on stories together, working as colleagues, not competitors. By producing a dummy issue composed entirely of his own features, Thurston Hopkins persuaded Picture Post to take him on as a freelancer, and from the mid-1950s as a staffer working exclusively for the magazine. over the years during changes of management and editors at the Magazine Thurston Hopkins worked as both a staffer and a freelancer.

One of his first essays was his popular 'Cats of London' (24 February 1951), a series made whilst working as a freelancer on other stories during which he would find stray cats living in the many bomb sites and back alleys. His best known photograph, done while freelancing, drew on this talent with animals. Entitled La Dolce Vita, Knightsbridge, London, 1953 the picture shows a limousine owner-driver with a regal poodle sitting bolt upright in the passenger seat. Ripe for commercial exploitation, it became a best selling postcard, poster and calendar image.

In support of the Post's social consciousness, Thurston Hopkins produced stories on children playing on the city streets in an effort to have the need for dedicated playgrounds recognised.

His 1956 story on the slums of Liverpool, however, was spiked when the municipal administrators protested to the magazine's proprietor Edward Hulton, over its negative portrayal of the city.

At Picture Post Thurston Hopkins met, and in 1955 married, another photographer: Grace Robertson, who worked under the byline Dick Muir to get work at Simon Guttman's Report agency in an era when women were at a disadvantage in the industry.

== Later career ==
With the closure of Picture Post in 1957, Thurston Hopkins conducted business as one of London's more successful advertising photographers from his studio in Chiswick before taking up teaching at the Guildford School of Art, a major British course in photography under Ifor Thomas. In his rural retirement Thurston Hopkins returned to his interest in painting.

== Personal life and death ==
Thurston Hopkins worked well into his old age and died a centenarian on 27 October 2014, survived by wife Grace, (daughter of Fyfe Robertson), his daughter, Joanna, his son, Robert, and a granddaughter, Cressida.

== Legacy ==
Photographs by salaried staff of Picture Post were retained in copyright by the Hulton empire; and when the magazine closed, the archive was sold to the British Broadcasting Corporation, and then to Brian Deutsch. The collection, including a large body of Thurston Hopkins pictures he made for the Post, is now owned and managed by Getty Images.

== Exhibitions ==
=== Solo exhibitions ===
- Thurston Hopkins, Arts Council Collection, Southbank Centre, London, January–December 1977
- After Dark, Zelda Cheatle Gallery, Covent Garden, London, 1993
- The Golden Age of Reportage: Thurston Hopkins, Getty Images Gallery, London, October 2003 – January 2004
- A Song of the British: Thurston Hopkins, Leica Gallery, New York, May–June 2005

=== Group exhibitions ===
- Dedans-Dehors: Le Portugal en photographies, Centre Calouste Gulbenkian, Collection de la Caixa Geral de Depósitos, Paris, France, May–July 2005.
- A Positive View: The Third Edition, Somerset House, South Building, London, March–April 2010
- Beneath the Surface, Somerset House, South Building, London, with Brassaï, Susan Derges, Sinje Dillenkofer, John Gay, Stephen Gill. May–August 2015
- An Ideal For Living: Photographing Class, Culture and Identity in Modern Britain, Huxley-Parlour Gallery, London, with 21 others including Richard Billingham, Bill Brandt, John Bulmer, Henri Cartier-Bresson, Bruce Davidson. July–September 2016
- Fine Photographs and Photobooks, Bloomsbury Auctions, London, with 31 others including Berenice Abbott, Eve Arnold, David Bailey, Édouard Baldus, Cecil Beaton. October 2016
- British Photographers at Home and Abroad, Keith de Lellis Gallery, New York with Cecil Beaton, Ian Berry, John Bulmer, Larry Burrows, Graham Finlayson and others, September–October 2016
