= Bert Hardy =

English photographer

- Hardy on assignment, February 1941 with Contax II 35 mm rangefinder camera.
- Born: Albert William Thomas Hardy; 19 May 1913; Blackfriars, London, England
- Died: 3 July 1995 (aged 82); Oxted, Surrey, England
- Occupation: Documentary photographer

Albert William Thomas Hardy (19 May 1913 – 3 July 1995) was an English documentary and press photographer known for his work published in the Picture Post magazine between 1941 and 1957.

== Life and work ==
Born in Blackfriars, Bert Hardy rose from humble working class origins in Southwark, London. The eldest of seven children, he left school at age 14 to work for a chemist who also processed photos. His first big sale came in 1935 when he photographed King George V and Queen Mary in a passing carriage during the Silver Jubilee celebrations, and sold 200 small prints of his best view of the King. His first assignment, at age 23, was to photograph Hungarian actor Sakall at the Mayfair Hotel. Hardy freelanced for The Bicycle magazine, and bought his first small-format 35 mm Leica. He signed on with the General Photographic Agency as a Leica photographer, later founding his own freelance firm, Criterion.

== General Photographic Agency ==
General Photographic Agency a Fleet Street, London agency, sold photos at least between 1880-1950.

== Picture Post and World War II ==
In 1941, Hardy was recruited by the then editor Tom Hopkinson of the leading picture publication of the 1930s to the 1950s, Picture Post. Founded in 1938 and funded by publisher Edward Hulton, the magazine's first editor was Hungarian émigré Stefan Lorant (1901–97) assisted by Hopkinson, who took over as editor from 1940. The picture-centric, left-leaning and reasonably-priced publication was highly successful and circulation soon rose to over a million. Hardy's photographer colleagues included Felix H. Man (aka Hans Baumann), John Chillingworth, Thurston Hopkins, Kurt Hutton, Leonard McCombe, Francis Reiss, Humphrey Spender, Grace Robertson and Bill Brandt, who went out with the writers on stories together, working as colleagues, not competitors.

Hardy was self-taught and used a Leica—unconventional gear for press photographers of the era—but went on to become the Post's Chief Photographer, after he earned his first photographer credit for his 1 February 1941 photo-essay about Blitz-stressed fire-fighters.

Hardy served as a war photographer in the Army Film and Photographic Unit (AFPU) from 1942 until 1946: he took part in the D-Day landings in June 1944; covered the liberation of Paris; the allied advance across the Rhine; and was one of the first photographers to enter the liberated Belsen to record the suffering there. He also saved some Russian slaves from a fire set by German police in the city of Osnabrück, before photographing the aftermath.

Near the end of World War II, Hardy went to Asia, where he became Lord Mountbatten's personal photographer.

He later went on to cover the Korean War along with journalist James Cameron for Picture Post, reporting on atrocities committed by Syngman Rhee's police under the United Nations flag at Pusan in 1950, and later on that war's turning point, the Battle of Inchon, photojournalism for which he won the Missouri Pictures of the Year Award, "obtaining pictures of the landing at Inchon as, unlike other members of the press, Hardy could shoot 1/15 sec at fl.5 with his Leica miniature".

== Late career ==
Hardy stayed on until Picture Post ceased publication in June 1957. It succumbed to the rise of television and falling circulation, and its increasingly unpopular identification with Labour's 'New Britain' and 'Fair Shares for All'; the party being defeated in the 1951 election. There being no other outlets for photojournalists, Hardy became an advertising photographer before giving the medium up altogether to become a farmer in 1964.

== Recognition ==
Three of Hardy's photos were used in Edward Steichen's famous The Family of Man exhibition and book; two were taken in Burma, including one of a monk at his desk in deep thought. Another shows a young couple, much in love and relaxing by the window of a tiny basement flat, photographed for part of a feature in Picture Post magazine, 'Scenes From The Elephant', published 8 January 1949, on everyday life in the Elephant and Castle district of South London. According to Hardy, the man in that portrait was a Canadian recently released from prison who had just spent a night with the prostitute in the photographer's image.

One of his most famous, and Hardy long claimed his favorite, photo, shows two young boys off on a lark in Gorbals, an image which has come to represent Hardy's keenest documentary skill. Hardy himself was photographed many times, including during the war; three photo-portraits of him are currently in the Photographs Collection of the National Portrait Gallery.

Having written an article for amateur photographers suggesting that you didn't need an expensive camera to take good pictures, Hardy staged a carefully posed photograph of two young women sitting on railings above a breezy Blackpool promenade using a Box Brownie in 1951, a photograph which has since become an iconic image of post-war Britain.

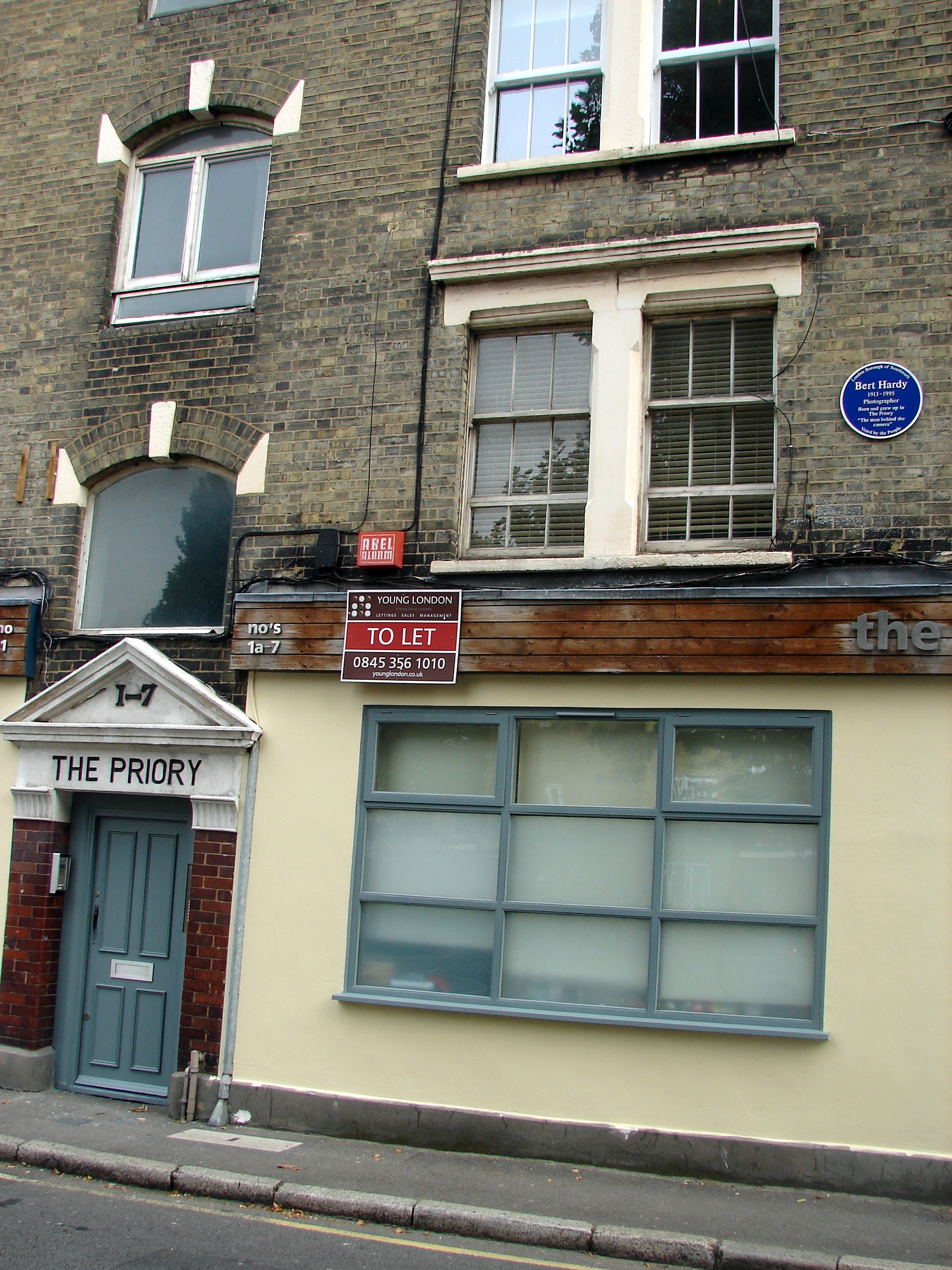
Family home

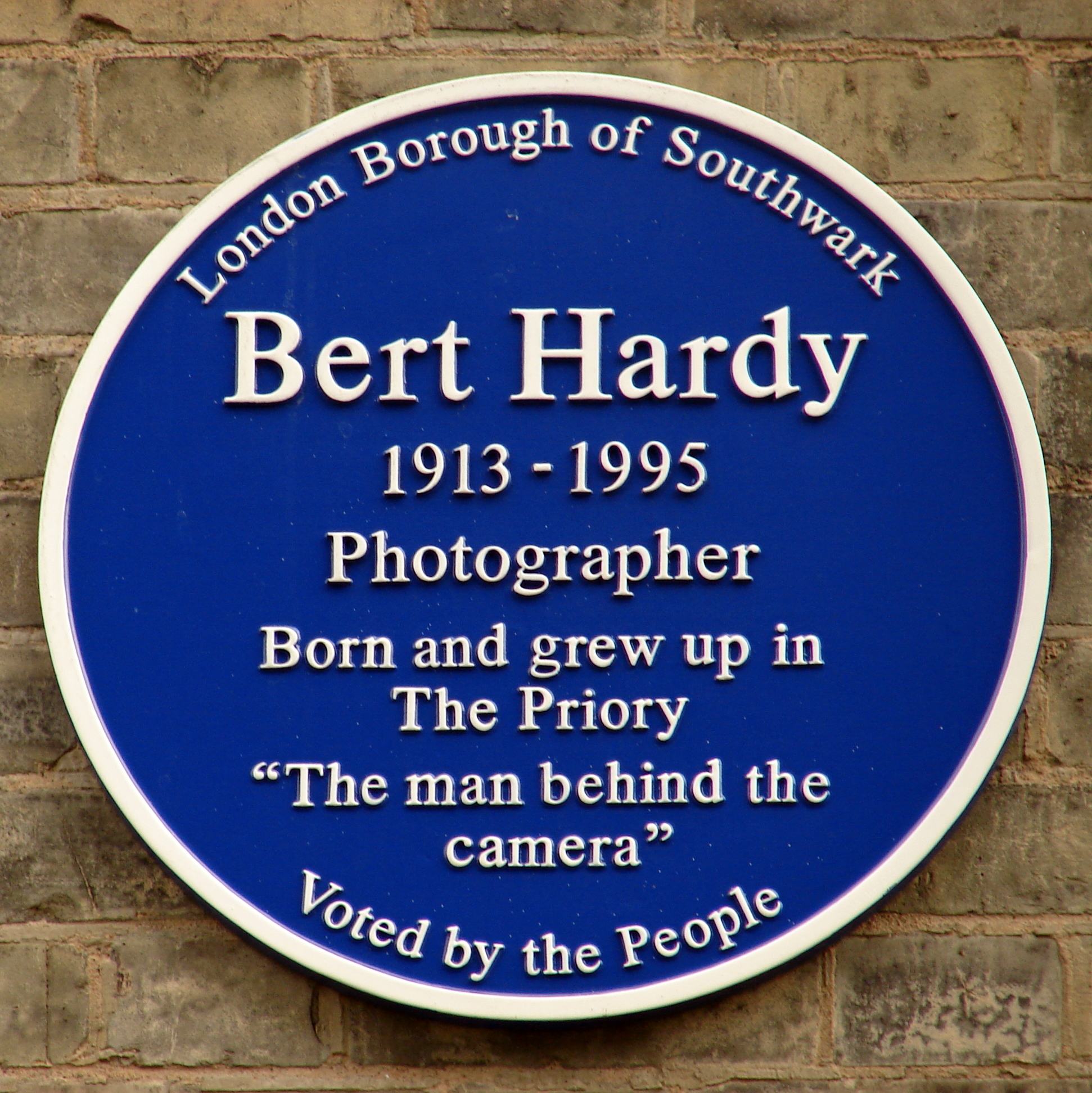
Blue Plaque

Bert Hardy's family home at The Priory, Webber Street, Southwark

Just before Picture Post closed, Hardy took 15 photos of the Queen's entrance at the Paris Opera on 8 April 1957, which were assembled as a photo-montage by the magazine's technicians. It was one of the most challenging photo-montages ever created, because there were a sizeable live crowd, guards, and other dignitaries, in front of his camera. After leaving Picture Post Hardy became one of the most successful advertising photographers until his retirement in 1964 to his farm in Oxted.

His second wife, Sheila, was a photo researcher for Picture Post and still holds the copyright to his private collection of photos; Getty Images holds the copyright to his Picture Post works.

A memorial plaque honouring him is in the journalists' church, St Bride's, Fleet Street, London.

In October 2008, London Borough of Southwark unveiled a Blue Plaque on Bert Hardy's family home at The Priory, Webber Street, Southwark. The plaque was erected following a popular vote.

Hardy's second wife, Sheila, was a photo researcher for Picture Post and she held the copyright to his private collection of photos; Getty Images holds the copyright to his Picture Post works.

Following Shelia's death in 2021 his collection has passed to The Bert Hardy Estate. Much of the material relating to his career has also been compiled into the Bert Hardy archive now held by the Journalism School at the University of Cardiff.

A retrospective exhibition of Hardy's work was held at The Photographers' Gallery in 2024. Reporting on the exhibition, Big Issue commented that Hardy had "captured a side of Britain lost to time".

== Bibliography ==
- Bert Hardy. Down the Bay: Picture Post, Humanist Photography and Images of 1950s Cardiff (2003)
- Bert Hardy. Bert Hardy: My Life (The Gordon Fraser Gallery Ltd, London, 1985)

== Sources ==
- Sue Davies. (1995-07-05). Obituary: Bert Hardy. The Independent. Retrieved 2008-04-04.
- Ben Campkin. Down and Out in London? Photography and the Politics of Representing 'Life in the Elephant', 1948 and 2005 in Swenarton, M., Troiani, T., Webster, H. (ed.) "The Politics of Making" (AHRA Critiques: Critical Studies in Architectural Humanities series. Abingdon and New York: Routledge, 2007), pp. 230–243. ISBN 978-0-415-43101-9.
- Graham Harrison. (2008). Photo Histories: The Life and Times of Albert Hardy (1913–1995). Retrieved 2008-06-16.
