= Gerti Deutsch =

Austrian-born British photographer

- Born: Gertrude Helene Deutsch; 19 December 1908; Vienna, Austria-Hungary
- Died: 9 December 1979 (aged 70); Leamington Spa, England, United Kingdom
- Occupation: Photojournalist
- Employer: Picture Post
- Spouse: Tom Hopkinson
- Children: Nicolette Roeske, Amanda Hopkinson

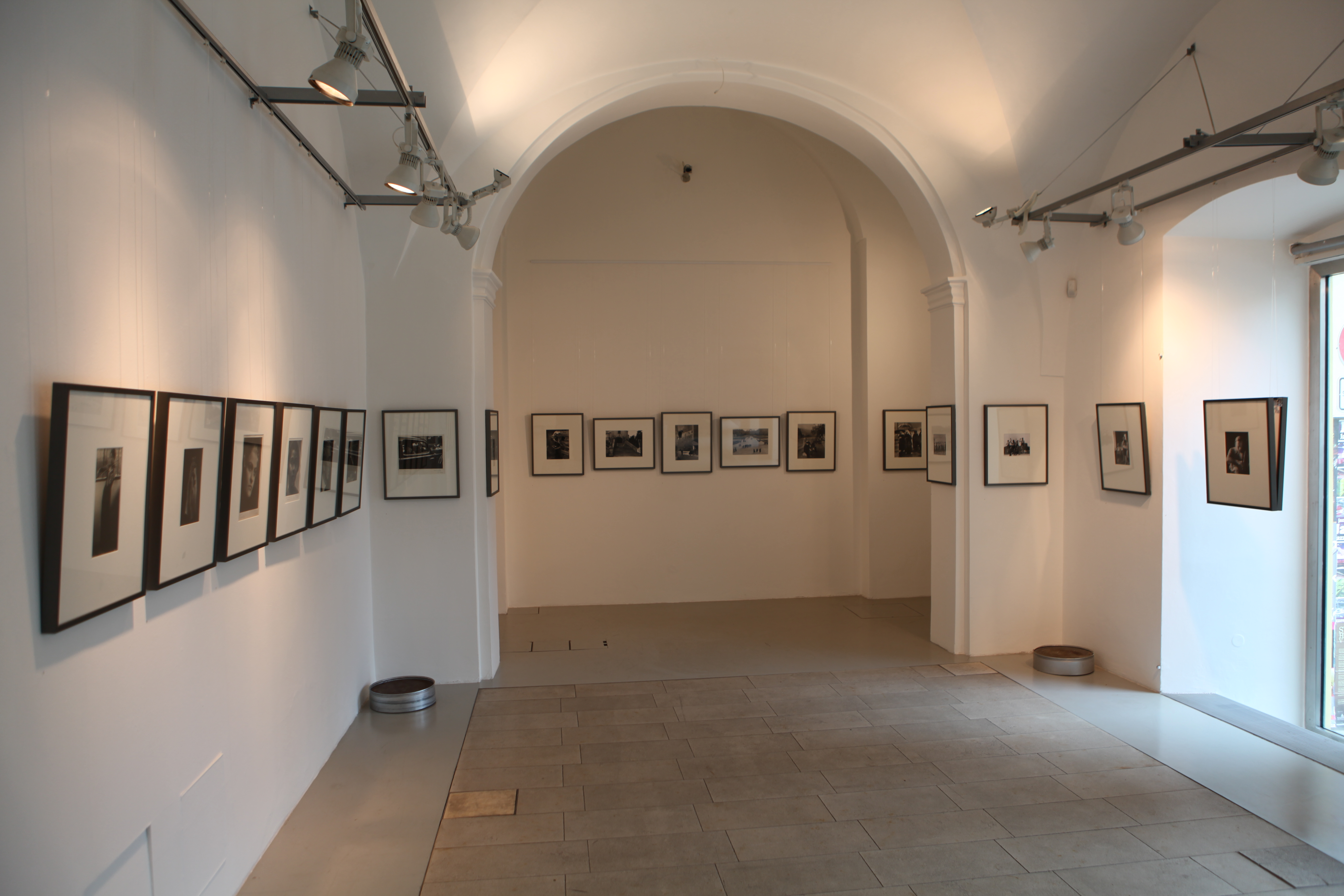

Gertrude Helene "Gerti" Deutsch (19 December 1908 – 9 December 1979), also known as Gertrude Hopkinson, was an Austrian-born British photographer. She is best known for her work for the magazine Picture Post, from 1938 until 1950.

== Early life and education ==
Deutsch was an only child, born to Jewish parents. Her mother was from Olomouc, Moravia and her father was from Bielsko-Biała, Eastern Silesia. She grew up in an apartment behind the Karlskirche in the centre of Vienna. Home-educated by a French governess as a young child and then at school in Vienna, she briefly attended an English boarding school at the age of sixteen, before entering the Wiener Musikakademie.

On graduation, her goal was a career as a concert pianist but, owing to neuritis in her right arm, her recitals were not to go far beyond entertaining her parents' social gatherings. From 1933 to 1934, she retrained as a photographer at the Graphische Lehr- und Versuchsanstalt in Vienna.

== Photography career ==
After periods spent in Paris and in London, where she thought she would be taken more seriously as a professional woman, Deutsch returned to Vienna during her father's final illness. However, owing to the increasingly threatening climate for Jews and the more promising professional opportunities in England, she returned for good to London.

In 1936, she had her first exhibition at an informal Austrian cultural association in London, forerunner of the present-day Austrian Cultural Forum, and in 1938 she began to work as a freelance photojournalist for the new weekly picture magazine Picture Post, founded by the Hungarian editor, Stefan Lorant. At that time, his assistant editor was Tom Hopkinson (who became editor from 1941 to 1950), and whom she married the same year. Two daughters followed, Nicolette (married name Roeske) and Amanda (married name Caistor).

Deutsch's main body of work covers the years between 1937 and the mid-1960s, and included portraiture and travel, family photographs ("Children a Speciality" it said on her business card) and editorial stories as well as photo-journalism.

== Later life ==
Deutsch did not return to visit her home city until more than two years after the War, when her father and other more distant relatives had died. She effectively retired from professional life in 1969, when she moved from London to live in a small village outside Salzburg. She returned to England in 1975, during her final illness, to be cared for by her daughter in Royal Leamington Spa, where she died in December 1979.

== Work ==
Over a period of thirty years, Deutsch produced a large number of photographic features—initially for Queen, The Sphere and Bystander, magazines that supplied references for her to obtain a work permit and the right to reside in Britain from 1937 onwards. She also, for a brief period, had a photographic studio on Grafton Street (where she established her signature, Gerti Deutsch of Vienna) and where she took professional and family portraits.

The first work she brought to show in London included a selection of portraits, taken on glass plate negatives, at the 1935 Salzburger Festspiele (Salzburg Festival), with iconic images of both the silver-haired Arturo Toscanini and the stunning young Black American soprano, Marian Anderson. There was also a small portfolio of very different images, steeped in the graphic precision of the Neue Sachlichkeit movement, and the geometric compositions of the Bauhaus. They showed a Vienna that was about to be swept away by Nazism and then War: an elderly Jewish man peering at postcard portraits of opera stars in a shop window; an old man on an iron bench, sunning himself and pulling on a meerschaum pipe, a sack of his possessions at his feet; a toothless newsvendor, knitting and chatting, copies of the Telegraf pegged to her waistband. Small wonder that Queen magazine wrote to the Home Office that: "Fraulein Deutsch is doing valuable artistic work of a kind not usually found in this country".

With the advent of war, Deutsch temporarily abandoned portraiture and street scenes, and began to work in a new medium, that of photojournalism. Her first story for Picture Post (December 1938), was called "Their first day in England", and documented the arrival of Jewish refugee children on the Kindertransport bringing them from Nazi Germany to the relative safety of England. Also outstanding is a photo-reportage made in late 1947, and published in January 1948 as Home from Russia.

In it, she documented a Vienna divided by the occupying powers, into whose eastern zone former prisoners of war were still being returned from the former Russian front. The harrowing scenes she witnessed in compiling this and A Foreign Correspondent's Life (with Anthony Terry) may well have affected her decision not to return to live in Vienna once her two daughters had grown up.

Like most of the relatively few women photographers on Picture Post, Deutsch shot a number of "soft" stories, including a couple on nursery schools and a long saga involving two children and their lost poodle. Her own daughters featured frequently, looking in a mirror or riding on a donkey – or, indeed, hunting Richmond Park for the missing pet dog. But she also used her connections to shoot stories that combined the political with the cultural, for example in that of the theatre company, composed entirely of exiled Austrians, performing – in German – The Good Soldier Schweik at the Lantern Theatre in Kilburn. Or, again, featuring children such as those who gathered at the Hampstead home of the architect Ernő Goldfinger to create pictures of the War, for an exhibition of children's drawings of the War [PP 5/1940].

From the 1940s through to the 1960s, she also took "story portraits" of writers and artists, from author John Cowper Powys in Wales to the sculptor Lynn Chadwick at his Gloucestershire studio to a great many authors and actors in London (Julian Huxley, J.B. Priestley, W. H. Auden and the Redgrave family among them).

After the War, Deutsch returned to photograph a very different Austria, away from the cities, often in more folkloric mode. Typical of her work in the early 1950s was a feature called "The Dance" that welcomes Spring [Illustrated, 12/1952] showing the still snowbound close of winter and featuring men dressed as Spring brides – and as witches, bound to dance till they dropped. From the mid-1950s, however, Deutsch worked increasingly for a different market, for Tatler, Harper's Bazaar; and for the new outlets Nova and Holiday; the Swiss magazine Atlantis and the French magazine L'ŒIL. As well as an increasing number of travel features – almost invariably going off the beaten track, frequently taking herself over mountains and down unmade roads in her tiny sports car. It was during this period that Deutsch frequently collaborated with the photographer Inge Morath, who had also emigrated from Austria and whom she came to know in London. Morath was a photographer with Magnum Photos (an agency specialising in what became known as humanitarian photography). Among Deutsch's surviving works, there are a number of photographs captioned and signed by both photographers and mostly taken in Austria, although so far no records documenting the precise extent of their cooperation have been found.

In her oeuvre there are also several outlines of book projects which were never realised and have survived as maquettes, including one on Austria and another on Japan, which she visited for six weeks over the summer of 1960. Deutsch had two major exhibitions during her lifetime: the first, on Austria, was shown at the Austrian Institute in London in 1958, the second, on Japan, at Olympia in London in 1962.

Music was a persistent interest in her career. From the start, she took many portraits of great musicians, including composers, instrumentalists and opera singers, such as Elisabeth Schwarzkopf, Franz Schmidt, Dea Gombrich, Edwin Fischer, Yehudi Menuhin, Benjamin Britten, Wilhelm Furtwängler, Bruno Walter, Artur Schnabel, Herbert von Karajan, Irmgard Seefried, Kathleen Ferrier, Fritz Busch and Clifford Curzon.

Many of them she photographed at work at festivals in Salzburg, Glyndebourne and Edinburgh, or relaxing with their families and friends.

In 2009 her daughters curated a small exhibition of her work at the Austrian Cultural Forum in London (February to May 2010) and in Berlin (January 2011), followed by a more extensive exhibition, curated by Kurt and Brigitte Kaindl, at the Fotohof gallery in Salzburg (June to July 2011).

A dual-language catalogue, with essays by Wolfgang Suschitzky, Amanda Hopkinson, Sabine Coelsch-Foisner and Kurt Kaindl and over 100 images was published by Fotohof edition.

== Publications ==
- Kaindl, Kurt. Gerti Deutsch- Photographs 1935–1965. Salzburg: Fotohof, 2011. ISBN 978-3-902675-55-2. Available in German and English
