= Camera Press =

British picture agency

Camera Press is a photographic picture agency founded in London in 1947 by Hungarian portrait photographer Tom Blau. Blau, whose subjects were often major contemporary political figures, musicians and film stars, migrated to London from Berlin in 1935 and became a naturalized British citizen in 1947.

== Historic archive ==
The Camera Press archive is of historic importance, the agency having represented among others Antony Armstrong-Jones, Patrick Lichfield, Cecil Beaton, Norman Parkinson, Thurston Hopkins, Baron (photographer) and Yousuf Karsh, whom Blau had signed on as the agency's first photographer. Baron's first assignment for the agency was the wedding of Queen Elizabeth II; Blau was the first to distribute pictures of the event.

The Camera Press also counted among its members lesser known photographers, such as Hedda Morrison in Sarawak, and mountaineer Alfred Gregory, whose work in distant parts of the British Commonwealth were of interest to the picture magazines thriving in the 1950s.

Each decade is represented in the collection with some of the best known celebrities: Steve Emberton's picture of Sid Vicious and Nancy Spungen at Vicious’ Maida Vale home in 1978; Clive Arrowsmith’s Kate Bush in 1980, Madonna, and Public Enemy in the 1990s.

In 2007 former managing director Roger Eldridge who had joined the agency as an editor in 1969 died suddenly, at 63 years old, on the way to a radio interview about the 60th anniversary of Camera Press. Other former managing directors of the agency included Donald Chapman and Jon Blau.

Emma Blau's photograph of Basement Jaxx appeared in an exhibition she curated of Camera Press imagery Camera Press at 70 – A Lifetime in Pictures which was held May 17–June 10, 2017 at the Bermondsey Project Space, 183-185 Bermondsey Street, London.

== Gallery ==
When Camera Press moved to Butlers Wharf near Tower Bridge from their original premises in Russell Square in March of 1993, the agency opened and ran the Tom Blau Gallery at 21 Queen Elizabeth Street, London SE1 to exhibit photographers including Roger Bamber, Robert Whittaker, Gemma Levine and Marcus Lyon. In 1996 The Camera Press became an independent charity and appointed a new director Keith Cavanagh. Emma Blau took over as Director of the Gallery in 2002 and in 2004 it became The Camera Press Gallery and changed focus to concentrate on showcasing its own photographers’ work.
