= Bamber =

Bamber is both an English surname and a given name. Notable people with the name include:

Surname:

- Bessie Bamber (fl. 1900–1910), British artist
- Dave Bamber (born 1959), English former professional footballer
- David Bamber (born 1954), British actor
- Earl Bamber (born 1990), New Zealand motor racing driver
- Edward Bamber (died 1646), English Roman Catholic priest
- Ellie Bamber (born 1997), English actress
- Helen Bamber (1925–2014), English psychotherapist
- Jack Bamber (1895–1971), English footballer
- Jamie Bamber (born 1973), British actor
- Jeremy Bamber (born 1961), convicted murderer
- Jim Bamber (1948–2014), English cartoonist
- John Bamber (footballer, born 1912), English footballer
- Mary Bamber (1874–1938), English suffragist and trade unionist
- Mike Bamber (died 1988), chairman of Brighton & Hove Albion Football Club (1973–1983)
- Roger Bamber (1944–2022), British photojournalist.
- Will Bamber (born 1993), New Zealand racing driver

Given name:

- Bamber Gascoigne (1935–2022), English television presenter
- Bamber Gascoyne (the elder) (1725–1791), British MP for Maldon, Bossiney, Midhurst, Weobley and Truro
- Bamber Gascoyne (the younger) (1758–1824), British MP for Liverpool

Other:

- Bamber Boozler, virtual host of the Teletext quiz game Bamboozle!

== See also ==
- Bamber Lake, New Jersey
- Bamber Bridge, Preston, Lancashire
  - Bamber Bridge F.C.
  - Bamber Bridge railway station
- Bamber's Green, Essex
