= Up Sunday =

British television comedy series (1972–1973)

- Created by: Mike Hill
- Starring: Clive James; Kenny Everett; John Wells; Willie Rushton; James Cameron; Vivian Stanshall; Eric Idle; Peter Sellers
- Country of origin: United Kingdom

Production
- Running time: 30 mins

Original release
- Network: BBC Two
- Release: 16 January 1972 – 23 December 1973

Up Sunday is a British late night comedy satire television show shown on BBC2 that ran for 55 editions over four series from January 1972 to December 1973, featuring many comedy stars of its era.

It was a spin-off from the arts discussion show Late Night Line-Up, and created by its Programme Editor, the late Mike Hill. Initially the show featured the "long, rambling topical reflections" of Willie Rushton and James Cameron. These were later pruned, and the cast enlarged to feature the likes of Clive James, Kenny Everett and John Wells. All broadcast late on a Sunday night. Wells said the show was "aimed at dirty minded insomniacs". The cast enacted the roles of newscasters, celebrities, pedestrians, and innocent bystanders.

Described by the Off The Telly site as "a haphazard but worthwhile review of the week with plenty of above average material and a small but loyal audience". The show was very low-budget, and considered the very "last gasp" of the sixties satire boom, featuring many of that movement's key figures. The show later broadened its talent base to go into wider and more surrealist areas.

Guests included Peter Sellers, Eric Idle, Sir John Betjeman, Spike Milligan, Ivor Cutler, Eleanor Bron, Barry Humphries, John Fortune, Max Wall, Richard Murdoch, Roy Hudd, Vivian Stanshall, Percy Edwards, Adge Cutler and The Wurzels. The show also contained musical spots, like folk singer Jake Thackray singing Brother Gorilla and Little Black Foal.

Preparations for the show were very loose, often with scripts being thought up at the last minute or not at all. The show had a "laid back" running order, so items could be included or dropped. Many guest appearances were down to them being friends of the cast. Sketches included Inspector Poirot Investigates, featuring John Fortune, Percy Edwards, John Wells as Adolf Hitler and Peter Sellers.

It also had two specials, Up The Channel and Up Christmas. During the preparation for the latter, ex-Bonzo Dog Band front man Vivian Stanshall appeared as a drunk Santa Claus, appearing out of a hamper, brandishing a Bloody Mary at the camera, before he fell over, cut his hand on the glass, and blood sprayed all over the white studio floor. According to Eric Idle, the show was made "not by the Light Entertainment Department but by Presentation, which would just make announcements and say 'Here on BBC-2 ...'"

The series spawned two spin-off shows. The first, The End of the Pier Show in 1974, with John Wells, John Fortune, Carl Davis, Madeline Smith, Peter Sellers, John Laurie, Ivor Cutler and John Bird. Considered highly innovative at the time, it was the first TV programme to mix cartoons with live performance. The second spin-off was In The Looking Glass in 1978. Both were produced by Mike Hill. The show was also influential in the creation of Rutland Weekend Television.
