= Ronald Ferns =

English painter

Ronald Ferns (14 October 1925 – 2 December 1997) was an English illustrator, designer, cartoonist and surrealist painter in oil and watercolour.

He attended Saint Martin's School of Art, London. His first major official commission was a mural for the 1951 Festival of Britain, in the Country Pavilion, for the Milk Marketing Board. In the same year, he was also commissioned to create the scenic design for the premiere of Fate’s Revenge by the Ballet Rambert.

Throughout the 1950s, he contributed witty line illustrations, decorations and cartoons to Lilliput, for which he also painted several covers in colour, Punch, Picture Post, Scope, and Good Housekeeping, for which he drew a regular series entitled "Semolina Silkpaws". He also illustrated a series of full-colour booklets for Guinness advertising campaigns. Other important advertising work included elegant watercolour covers for Fortnum & Mason catalogues.

In the early 1960s, he moved with his wife Iris to St Ives in Cornwall, so he could diversify from "commercial art" into painting and other endeavours. As well as developing his noted series of surreal paintings in oil, which were sold through the Portal Gallery in London, he set up, with Iris, an initiative called "Studio 22". Together, they designed and made ceramic jewellery, art pottery and beach clothes such as kaftans.

They moved back to London in the 1970s, where Ronnie continued to paint for the Portal Gallery and provide illustrations for the Bond Street fashion emporium, Ports. However, he was increasingly drawn to book illustration. Alongside a successful series in collaboration with the poet Gavin Ewart – The Learned Hippopotamus (1986), Caterpillar Stew (1990) and Like It Or Not (1992) – he began writing children's stories as well as illustrating them.

His first book as both writer and artist, Osbert And Lucy (1988), was successful not only in Britain but also in the US, and was translated into several European languages. It was subsequently included in the 2003 anthology, The Hutchinson Book of Bunny Tales. His second book, Bumpity And the Big Snake, was published in 1994.
