= Weekly Illustrated =

UK magazine

- Editor: Stefan Lorant
- Staff writers: Tom Hopkinson
- Categories: Photojournalism
- Frequency: Weekly
- Publisher: Weekly Illustrated
- Country: United Kingdom
- Based in: London
- Language: English

Weekly Illustrated was a weekly British magazine.

The magazine was launched in 1934 by Odhams Press, publishers of the Daily Herald. Under the editorship of Stefan Lorant (1901–1997) it was the first British picture magazine that was based on European ideas of photo reportage. Photojournalists contributing to the magazine included Bill Brandt and Felix H. Man. There were sometimes special issues for notable occasions such as coronations and royal birthdays, or selected topics such as the Queen Mary liner. Journalists working with Stefan Lorant included Tom Hopkinson (1905–1990), later knighted in 1978. Both were also editors of the magazine Picture Post. In 1939 the Weekly Illustrated changed its name to Illustrated when it merged with The Passing Show. It continued to be published until 1958 when it was incorporated into John Bull.

== See also ==
- Picture Post
