= Amnesty International UK Media Awards 1993 =

The 1993 awards were in 6 categories: National Print, Periodicals, Radio, Regional Print, Television Documentary and Television News.

A Special Award for Best Historical Documentary was made to the Channel 4 programme "Drowning by Bullets", which dealt the Paris massacre of 1961 and the events of 17 October 1961.

The overall winning entry was from BBC Radio 4, with their then South Africa correspondent Fergal Keane.

== 1993 Awards ==
1993
Category	Title	Organisation	Journalists	Refs
National Print
National Print	Reports on Yugoslavia	The Guardian	Maggie O'Kane; Ed Vulliamy	
Periodicals
Periodicals	Children on the front line	She magazine	Rebecca Abrams	
Radio
Radio	Report on an incident of torture in South Africa	BBC Radio 4	Fergal Keane	
Regional Print
Regional Print	The manufacture of leg-irons in Birmingham	Express & Star	Ian Cobain	
Special Award
Special Award	Best Historical Documentary "Drowning by Bullets"	Channel 4 Secret History	Philip Brooks; Alan Hayling	
Television; Documentary
Television; Documentary	"The Gluckman Files"	Channel 4 Dispatches	John Bridcut	
Television; News
Television; News	Report on Kashmir	Channel 4 News	Kent Barker	
