= Robert Thurston Hopkins =

British writer and ghost hunter

- Born: 1884; Bury St Edmunds, England
- Died: 1958 (aged 73–74)
- Occupations: Writer, ghost hunter
- Years active: 1913–1956

Robert Thurston Hopkins (1884–1958) was a British writer and ghost hunter.

Hopkins was born in Bury St. Edmunds, Suffolk in 1884.

Hopkins wrote biographical works on Rudyard Kipling and Oscar Wilde. He also wrote books on the English countryside.

Hopkins was a ghost hunter known for his books on ghosts. He described his experiences in his book Adventures with Phantoms (1946). He claimed to have encountered the ghost of a hanged man in a woodland near Burwash on two occasions in the 1930s.

His son was Godfrey Thurston Hopkins (1913–2014), known as Thurston, well-known Picture Post photojournalist.

== Publications ==
- Oscar Wilde: A Study of the Man and His Work (1913)
- War and the Weird (1916)
- Kipling's Sussex (1921)
- Rudyard Kipling, a Character Study: Life, Writings and Literary Landmarks (1921)
- H. G. Wells: Personality, Character, Topography (1922)
- Thomas Hardy's Dorset (1922)
- Rudyard Kipling's World (1925)
- The Kipling Country (1925)
- The Literary Landmarks of Devon & Cornwall (1926)
- Old English Mills and Inns (1927)
- This London: Its Taverns, Haunts and Memories (1927)
- London Pilgrimages (1928)
- The Lure of London (1929)
- In Search of English Windmills (1931)
- Old Windmills of England (1931)
- The Man Who Was Sussex (1933)
- Life and death at the Old Bailey (1935)
- Moated Houses of England (1935)
- Adventures with Phantoms (1946)
- The Heart of London (1951)
- Ghosts Over England (1953)
- The World's Strangest Ghost Stories (1955?)
- Cavalcade of Ghosts (1956)
