= James Cameron (journalist) =

British journalist (1911–1985)

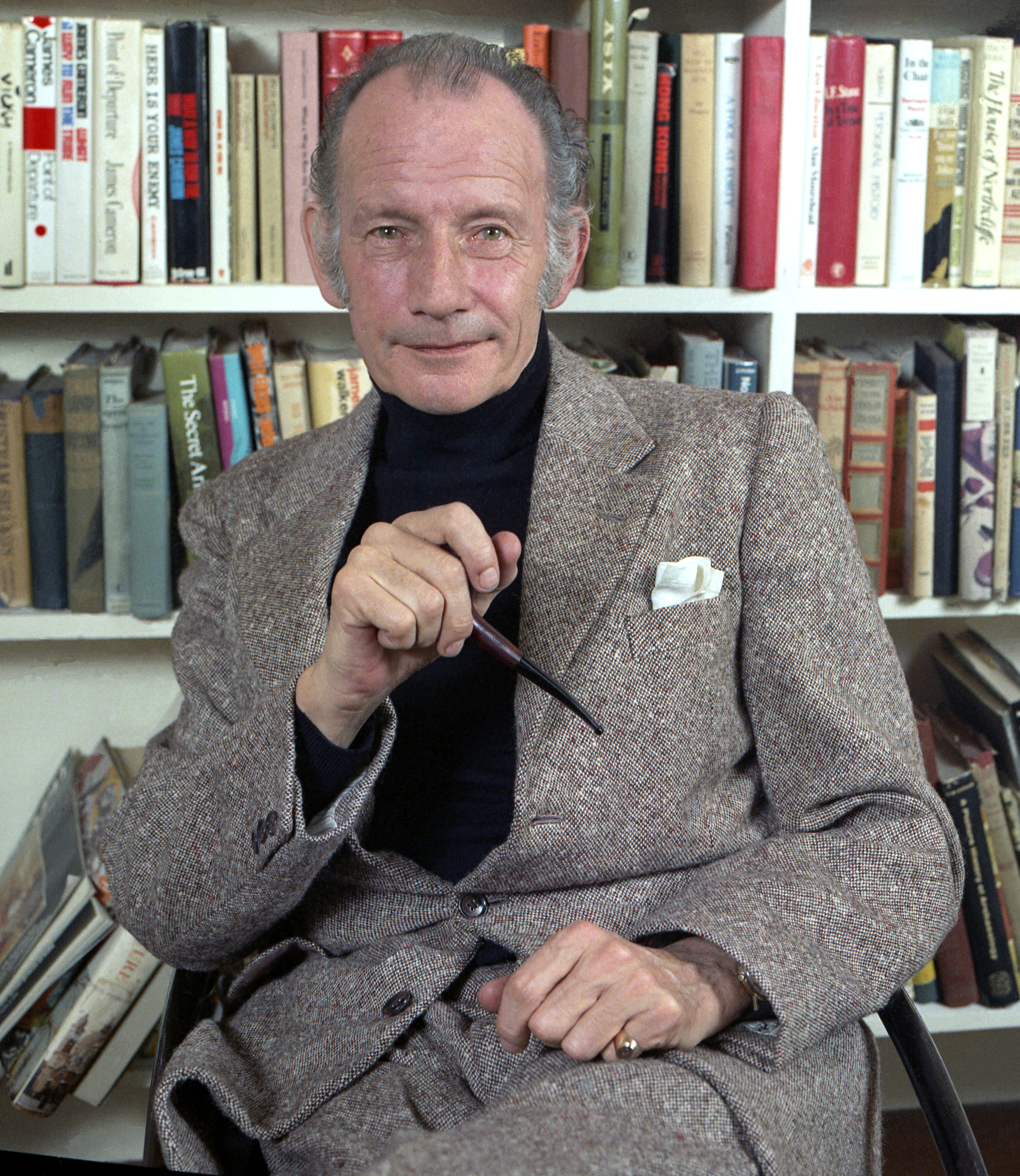
Image of James Cameron

Mark James Walter Cameron CBE (17 June 1911 – 26 January 1985) was a British journalist and writer, in whose memory the annual James Cameron Memorial Lecture is given.

== Early life ==
Cameron was born in Battersea, London, of Scottish parentage. His father, William Ernest Cameron, was a barrister who wrote novels under the pseudonym Mark Allerton and his mother was Margaret Douglas (née Robertson) Cameron.

== Career ==
Cameron began as an office dogsbody with the Weekly News in 1935. Having worked for several Scottish newspapers and for the Daily Express in Fleet Street, he was rejected for military service in World War II. After the war, his experience of reporting on the Bikini Atoll nuclear experiments and the first British nuclear test in South Australia turned him into a pacifist and, later, a founding member of the Campaign for Nuclear Disarmament. He continued to work for the Express until 1950, after which he briefly joined Picture Post, where he and photographer Bert Hardy covered the Korean War, winning the Missouri Pictures of the Year International Award for "Inchon". Tom Hopkinson, the editor of Picture Post, lost his job as publisher when he defended the magazine's coverage of atrocities committed by South Korean troops at a concentration camp in Pusan. Cameron wrote, "I had seen Belsen, but this was worse. This terrible mob of men – convicted of nothing, un-tried, South Koreans in South Korea, suspected of being 'unreliable'." The founder of the Hulton press, Edward G. Hulton, decided to "kill" the story.

In 1952 Cameron wrote an obituary essay for The Illustrated London News, "The King Is Dead", about the death of King George VI. Cameron then spent eight years with the News Chronicle until the paper ceased publication, in 1960. In 1953 he visited Albert Schweitzer in Lambaréné, in French Equatorial Africa (now Gabon) and found flaws in the practices and attitudes of Schweitzer and his staff. This was the subject of The Walrus and the Terrier, a BBC Radio 4 Afternoon Play by Christopher Ralling, broadcast on 7 April 2008.

In 1965, Cameron wangled his way into North Vietnam for interviews and photos (with photographer Romano Cagnoni) of Ho Chi Minh and its other leaders. His book Here Is Your Enemy was published in the United States, and his five-part series on North Vietnam was published in December 1965 in The New York Times, where it was edited by journalist Anthony Lewis.

Cameron also did illustration work, especially in his early career. Working in Scotland for D. C. Thomson, he prepared drawings for sensationalist items in Thomson's publications. He rebelled when asked to draw a picture of a murdered young girl, embellishing it with excess blood and grisly detail. Called to Thomson's office, he was rebuked merely for exposing her underwear.

Cameron became a broadcaster for the BBC after the war, writing and presenting such television series as Cameron Country, and numerous single documentaries. An unusual example was Edgar Wallace: The Man Who Made His Name, a television biography of the thriller writer and journalist. He was a frequent contributor to Up Sunday, a magazine show that featured him and other commentators talking to the camera about topics of interest to them. Cameron also wrote a radio play, The Pump (1973), based on his experience of open heart surgery, which won a Prix Italia award in 1973. In his last years, he wrote a column for The Guardian. Cameron wrote two volumes of autobiography: Point of Departure, a chronicle of his life, and An Indian Summer, about his relationship with India, his marriage to his third wife, Moni, originally of Indian nationality, and his serious car accident and near death in Calcutta.

== Personal life ==
Cameron's first wife, Elma, died in childbirth near the start of World War II. Before she died she gave birth to their daughter, also Elma (Eleanor Margaret). He later married Elizabeth Marris (who already had a son, Desmond Roderic O’Conor, by a previous marriage to Denis O'Conor Don). He also had a son, Fergus, with Elizabeth. In 1971 he married Moneesha ("Moni") Sarkar. James Cameron died of a stroke in his sleep on 26 January 1985. He was 73.

Among his literary relatives are the Gighan poet the Rev Kenneth Macleod – of "The Road to the Isles" fame – and the writer the Rev Dr John Urquhart Cameron of St Andrews.

== Works by Cameron ==
=== Books ===
- Touch of the Sun (1950)
- Mandarin Red (1955)
- 1914: A Portrait of the Year (1959)
- The African Revolution (1961)
- 1916: Year of Decision (1962)
- Men of Our Time (1963)
- Here is Your Enemy (1965)
- Witness [in Vietnam] (1966)
- Point of Departure (1967) ISBN 0-85362-175-6
- What a Way to Run the Tribe (selected journalism) (1968)
- An Indian Summer: A Personal Experience of India (1974) ISBN 0-14-009569-1
- The Making of Israel (1976) ISBN 0-80085-084-X
- Wish You Were Here: The English at Play. London: Gordon Fraser, 1976. ISBN 0-900406-70-4. Introduction and commentary by Cameron, photographs by Patrick Ward).
- Yesterday's Witness (1979)
- The Best of Cameron (1981)

=== Broadcasts ===
Cameron's television work includes:

- "The Romance of India Railways". The World About Us. BBC. 4 May 1975.

== James Cameron Memorial Trust Award ==
There is an annual James Cameron Award Ceremony in London.

Previous winners include:

- 1987. David Hirst
- 1988. Michael Buerk
- 1989. Neal Ascherson
- 1990. John Simpson
- 1991. Robert Fisk & Charles Wheeler
- 1992. Bridget Kendall
- 1993. Martin Woollacott
- 1994. Ed Vulliamy
- 1995. George Alagiah
- 1996. Maggie O'Kane
- 1997. Fergal Keane
- 1998. Jonathan Steele
- 1999. Ann Leslie
- 2000. Jon Swain
- 2001. For consistently impartial reporting from Israel, Suzanne Goldenberg.
- 2002. For reporting from Africa, Chris McGreal.
- 2003. Norma Percy
- 2004. For Outstanding Journalism, John Ware.
- 2004. Special Posthumous Award, Paul Foot.
- 2005. Lindsey Hilsum
- 2006. Patrick Cockburn
- 2007. Ghaith Abdul-Ahad
- 2008. Peter Taylor
- 2009. For reporting on Barack Obama's election, Gary Younge.
- 2010. Michela Wrong & Lasantha Wickrematunge
- 2011. Alex Crawford
- 2012. Martin Wolf
- 2013. Lyse Doucet
- 2014. Luke Harding
- 2015. Jeremy Bowen
- 2016. Ian Pannell received the James Cameron Memorial Award. The Special Award went to David Walsh of The Sunday Times. The lecture was given by Gideon Rachman of The Financial Times.

From 2017 onwards, City St George's, University of London continued to host the James Cameron Memorial Lecture, but the prize was replaced with the Eric Robbins Prize. The James Cameron Memorial Lecture was given by:

- 2017. Lyse Doucet
- 2018. Lionel Barber
- 2019. Isabel Hilton
- 2020. Gary Younge
- 2022. Clive Myrie
- 2023. Dorothy Byrne
- 2024. John Micklethwait
