= Amanda Hopkinson =

British scholar and literary translator (born 1948)

- Born: 1948 (age 76–77); London, England
- Occupations: Scholar and literary translator
- Parent(s): Tom Hopkinson and Gerti Deutsch

Amanda Hopkinson (born 1948) is a British scholar and literary translator.

== Biography ==
She was born in London, England, to the British journalist and magazine editor Sir Tom Hopkinson and photographer Gerti Deutsch. She gained a BA from the University of Warwick in 1970.

During her academic career, Hopkinson has taught at City University, Manchester University, the University of East Anglia, the University of East London, Westminster University and Cardiff University. As a translator, she is best known for her English versions of contemporary Latin American literature. She has also translated several works by the French crime writer Dominique Manotti. In this work, she frequently collaborates with fellow translators Ros Schwartz and her husband Nick Caistor, with whom she lives in Norwich.

Hopkinson is additionally a writer on photography. She has published monographs on Julia Margaret Cameron, Martin Chambi and Manuel Alvarez Bravo, and has further written or edited a number of books on photography and photojournalism. Hopkinson has also written the obituaries of numerous photographers for The Guardian newspaper.

== Selected translations ==
- Carmen Posadas: Child's Play
- Claribel Alegría: Family Album
- Diamela Eltit: Sacred Cow
- Dolores Payas: Drink Time!: In the Company of Patrick Leigh Fermor
- Elena Poniatowska: Leonora
- Isabel Allende: The Japanese Lover
- Jose Saramago: Journey to Portugal
- Jose Saramago: The Notebook
- Paulo Coelho: The Devil and Miss Prym
- Ricardo Piglia: Money to Burn
- Sergio Bizzio: Rage
- Lovers and Comrades: Women's Resistance Poetry from Central America
- Dominique Manotti: Affairs of State
- Dominique Manotti: Dead Horsemeat
- Dominique Manotti: Escape
- Dominique Manotti: Lorraine Connection

== Works on photography ==
- 150 Years of Photo Journalism
- Manuel Alvarez Bravo
- Martin Chambi
- Julia Margaret Cameron
- Between Ourselves: The Photographs of Mari Mahr
- Contemporary Photographers
- Desires and Disguises: Latin American Women Photographers
- Five Pioneers of Photography
- Hidden View: Images of Bahia, Brazil
- Photographs by Gerti Deutsch 1908–1979
- Rehearsal: Photographs of Dance
- Sixties London: Photographs by Dorothy Bohm
