= Felix H. Man =

German photographer and art collector

- Born: Hans Felix Sigismund Baumann; November 30, 1893; Freiburg, Breisgau, Germany
- Died: January 30, 1985 (aged 91); London, England
- Known for: Photojournalism (Picture Post, etc.)
- Notable work: The lights go up in London (1945)
- Awards: Kulturpreis der Deutschen Gesellschaft für Photographie (1965); Großes Bundesverdienstkreuz (1982)

Hans Felix Sigismund Baumann aka Felix H. Man (November 30, 1893 – January 30, 1985) was a German-British photographer and later an art collector. In particular, he was a leading pioneer photojournalist, especially for Picture Post.

== Life ==
Man was born in Freiburg, Breisgau, Germany. After finishing school in Freiburg im Breisgau, from 1912 he studied art and art history in Munich and Berlin. His studies were interrupted by the First World War. He took part in WWI as an officer and began to take photographs at the front. Here he undertook his first reporting for Ruhe an der Westfront. In 1918 at the end of WWI, he resumed his studies in Munich and continued in Berlin.

In Berlin in 1927, Man started work as an illustrator and graphic designer for the BZ newspaper and for Tempo. From 1928, he was employed by the Deutscher Photodienst (Dephot), for which he worked from 1929 under the pseudonym "Man". His reportages appeared under this pseudonym in the Münchner Illustrierte Presse, where he met Stefan Lorant. During 1929 to 1932, he created 110 photo reports, such as his photo essay A day in the life of Mussolini from 1931.

Man toured North Africa, Canada, and the Canadian Arctic, from where he delivered his photo reports for the Berliner Illustrirte Zeitung. In 1933, he returned to Berlin and received no work permit because he refused to enter the Reichspressekammer and so he emigrated to England in May 1934. His 41 picture reports, produced between 1929 and 1935 in Canada, continued to be published in the Berliner Illustrirte Zeitung.

After his emigration in 1934, he met Stefan Lorant in London, where he was editor of the refounded Weekly Illustrated and within six months published 47 image reports. He then moved to the Daily Mirror, where he remained until 1938, to then work under the direction of Stefan Lorant as a chief photographer at Picture Post, with 100–150 annual photo reports. He also worked for Life and The Sunday Times.

In 1948, the Picture Post began printing colour pages and was also groundbreaking in the field of colour image reporting, and along with Tim N. Gidal, pioneered colour photography in photojournalism.

After the Second World War, Man began to collect lithographs and in 1953 published 150 years of artists' lithographs 1803–1953 and one year later Eight European Artists. During the years 1959–1971, he lived in Switzerland and then in Rome, Italy, where he worked for The World. In 1977, he participated in the documenta 6 quinquennial contemporary art exhibition, held in Kassel, Germany.

His photo reports moved away from juxtaposed single images and so he is considered an innovator of European photojournalism. His work on the history of lithography is also significant.

During his career, Man took portrait photographs of leading political and cultural figures such is Clement Attlee, William Beveridge, Ernest Bevin, Sir Stafford Cripps, T. S. Eliot, Oskar Kokoschka, David Lloyd George, John Masefield, Henry Moore, Paul Nash, George Orwell, Dame Sybil Thorndike, and Evelyn Waugh, some of which are in the National Portrait Gallery, London. The gallery also holds a photograph of Man himself by Roger George Clark, daing from 1983. The lights go up in London, a 1945 photograph by Man, is held in the Tate collection.

He died in 1985 in London.

== Publications ==
- 150 years of artists' lithographs 1803–1953. London: Heinemann, 1953.
- Eight European Artists. London: Heinemann, 1954.
- Artists' lithographs: a world history from Senefelder to the present day. London: Studio Vista, 1970.
- Felix H. Man – Photographien aus 70 Jahren. Munich: Schirmer/Mosel, 1983. ISBN 3-88814-122-2

== Honours ==
- Culture Award of the German Society for Photography (1965)
- Großes Bundesverdienstkreuz – Great Federal Cross of Merit (1982)

The Felix H. Man Memorial Prize is open to photographers under the age of 30.

== Sources ==
- Misselbeck, Reinhold, ed. (2002). Prestel-Lexikon der Fotografen: von den Anfängen bis zur Gegenwart (in German). Munich: Prestel. ISBN 3-7913-2529-9.
- Molderings, Herbert. "Eine Schule der modernen Fotoreportage". Fotogeschichte (in German). Vol. 107. pp. 4–21.
- Koetzle, Hans-Michael (2015). Fotografen A–Z (in German). Germany: Taschen. ISBN 978-3-8365-1107-0.
