= Dominique Manotti =

French crime writer and economic historian (born 1942)

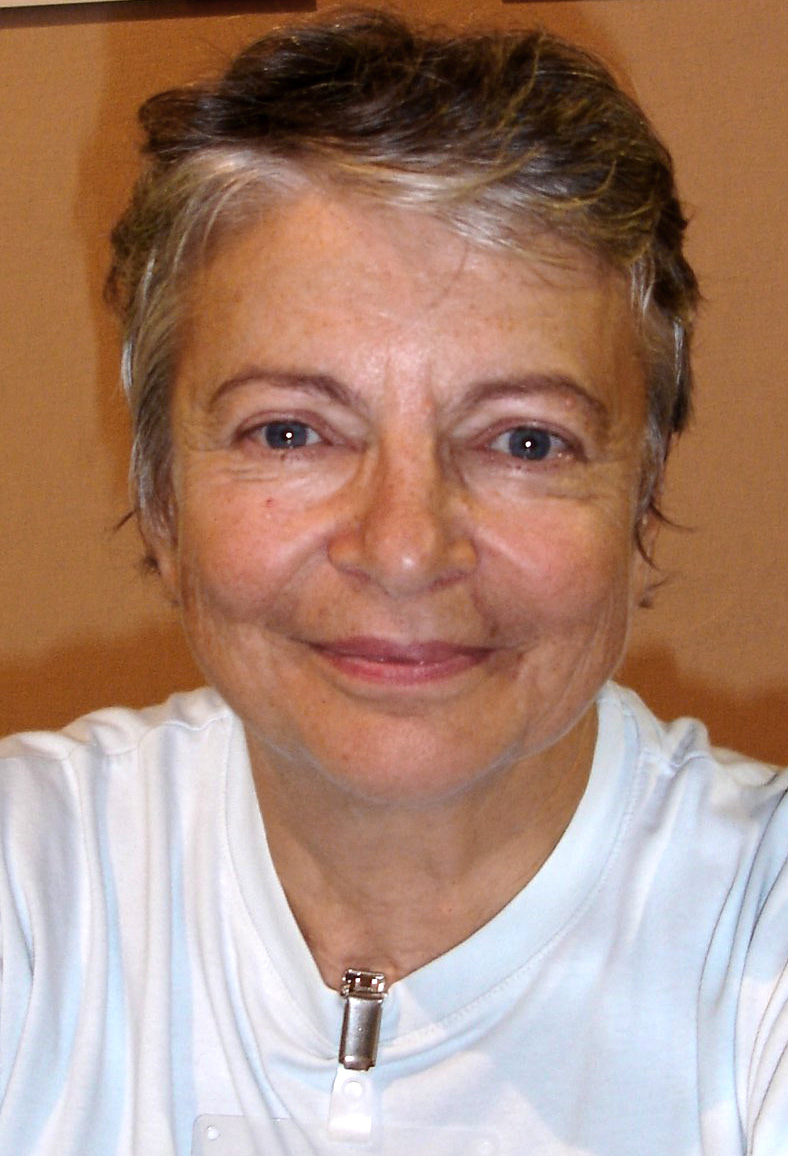
- Manotti in 2006
- Born: Marie-Noëlle Thibault; 23 December 1942 (age 83); Paris, France
- Occupations: Writer; economic historian
- Writing career
- Genre: Crime fiction
- Notable awards: Grand Prix de Littérature Policière (2011)

Dominique Manotti (born Marie-Noëlle Thibault December 23, 1942 in Paris) is a French crime writer and economic historian. She has written more than a dozen books, many of which have been translated. Among her many prizes is the 2011 Grand Prix de Littérature Policière, the most prestigious award in French crime fiction.

Manotti lives in Paris, where she is a professor of 19th-century economic history.

== Novels ==
- 1995: Sombre Sentier, published in English as Rough Trade, translated by Margaret Crosland and Elfreda Powell; Arcadia Books (London) in 2001
- 1997: À nos chevaux!, published in English as Dead Horsemeat, translated by Amanda Hopkinson and Ros Schwartz; Arcadia Books (London), 2007
- 1998: Kop;
- 2001: Nos fantastiques années fric, published in English as Affairs of State, translated by Amanda Hopkinson and Ros Schwartz, Arcadia Books (London), 2010
- 2004: Le Corps noir;
- 2006: Lorraine Connection, published in English under the same title, translated by Amanda Hopkinson and Ros Schwartz; Arcadia Books (London), 2008. - Winner of the CWA International Dagger
- 2010: Bien connu des services de police;
- 2011: L'Honorable Société;
- 2013: L'Évasion, published in English as Escape, translated by Ros Schwartz and Amanda Hopkinson, 2014
- 2013: Le Rêve de Madoff;
- 2015: Or noir;
- 2018: Racket
