= Hedda Morrison =

German photographer (1908–1991)

- Hedda Morrison, 1941 by Alastair Morrison
- Born: Hedwig Marie Hammer; 13 December 1908; Stuttgart, German Empire
- Died: 3 December 1991 (aged 82); Canberra, Australia
- Education: Bäyerische Staatslehranstalt für Lichtbildwesen, Munich, Germany
- Known for: Documentary photography
- Spouse: Alastair Morrison (1946–1991, her death)

Hedwig Marie "Hedda" Morrison (née Hammer; 13 December 1908 – 3 December 1991) was a German photographer who created historically significant documentary images of Beijing, Hong Kong and Sarawak from the 1930s to the 1960s.

== Biography ==
Born Hedda Hammer in Stuttgart, 13 December 1908 the only sibling of a younger brother Siegfried in a well-to-do middle class family whose father worked for a publishing company. A polio epidemic in 1911–12 affected her stature and gait and a major operation to correct its effects, brought other health problems that were to affect her for life. At age 11 she was given a Box Brownie camera which inspired her resolve to become a photographer.

== Photographic training ==
After her secondary education at Königin Katherina Stift Gymnasium für Mädchen, Stuttgart, she commenced study in medicine at the University of Innsbruck, Austria, but prevailed on her parents to enrol her (1929–31) at the State Institute for Photography (Bayerische Staatslehranstalt für Lichtbildwesen) in Munich, Bavaria's oldest photography school, completing the certificate course and winning third prize in a student competition in 1931. While still a student her uncredited photographs were published in Walter de Sager's Making Pottery, which anticipate her interest in, and documentation of, handcraft construction in S. E. Asia.

Hammer was apprenticed during the Great Depression in the commercial studios of the technically exacting Adolf Lazi at Stuttgart 1931–2, though he could not employ her due to the economic strife, so she sought further experience at the Olga Linckelmann Photographische Werkstätte, Hamburg in 1932. Though she was trained in the aesthetics of the New Objectivity of the period which promoted a formalist approach, her inclination was toward documentary ethnography; recording traditional German Volk costume in the setting of their rural environment in forty-four photographic negatives she preserved and catalogued "Trachtenfest, Stuttgart 1931". Her aesthetic, practiced throughout her career is a blending of these disciplines, the pictorial, the designed and the document.

== China 1933–1946 ==
Not finding the political or economic situation in Germany to her liking, and encouraged by a horoscope advising she should undertake a long voyage, in 1933 Hammer took up a position in China to manage Hartung's Photo Shop, a German-owned commercial photographic studio at 3 Legation Street, in the old diplomatic quarter of the city then known as Beiping. She was in charge of seventeen local photographers and soon learned to speak passable Mandarin Chinese and a smattering of Cantonese, and in her spare time she made solo expeditions into parts of northern China.

In August 1938, due the Japanese occupation of the city, Hartung's was unable to continue employing her. As a German (the country was an ally of Japan), and unlike other Europeans who were deported, Morrison enjoyed relative freedom and worked from home in Nanchang Street as a freelancer selling albums and single prints of views and of handicrafts to prosperous visiting tourists. Though the living was precarious, through fellow expatriates, she found work 1938–40 sourcing artefacts for a wealthy British dealer in Chinese arts and crafts, Caroline Frances Bieber in Beiheyan, who collected for the Brooklyn Museum in New York, and thus Morrison was able to continue her excursions through the country into the 1940s.

Of her solo travels Morrison remarked that; "Chinese attitudes towards a solitary woman traveller could not have been more correct or helpful, and I met with courtesy wherever I went." With Bieber and writer Beatrice Kates, she assembled her 1937–8 documentations of household furniture for a project published in 1948. Her photographs of architecture and Chinese daily life made between 1933 and 1946, featured in a series of books, beginning with Alfred Hoffman's Nanking (1945) and her own Hua Shan (1974). They preserve the appearance of Peking before the depredations and destruction that began with the destruction of the city walls under Maoist rule.

== South-East Asia ==
In 1941, (Note: 1940, according to other sources.) Hammer met Alastair Morrison in Peking, where he had been born, son of the London Times correspondent in Peking, Australian George Ernest Morrison who reported on the Boxer Rebellion. While he was away in service she lived during the Pacific War in the house of a French diplomat. She married Morrison in 1946 and they left the unrest in China shortly afterwards, first for Hong Kong for six months and then for Sarawak, where Alastair became a government district officer during its turbulent cession to British Crown Colony (1946–61). During her 20-year stay in Sarawak, as well as making independent photographic expeditions which resulted in her books Sarawak (1957) and Life in a Longhouse (1962), from 1960–66 she took photographs on behalf of the government Information Office, Kuching, and trained the department's photographers.

== Australia ==
In 1967 the Morrisons moved to Australia and where they lived in Canberra, where she freelanced for the Australian Information Service. In 1990 the Canberra Photographic Society made her a life member.

== Photography ==
During her time in Beijing Morrison took many photographs of the old city and its people, temples and markets and continued to record the environments and cultures of the countries in which she lived. Many of her subjects were disappearing as she photographed them; Chinese civilisation under Japanese occupation and before Communism; Hong Kong transitioning from the irreversible impact of WW2 on its traditional cultures; and the vanishing Ibans and their long houses in Sarawak.

In her student years and for some of her Chinese work she used a Linhof Satzplasmat 9 x 12 cm sheet-film camera. Until she adopted colour in the 1950s, she made exclusively black and white photographs with her medium-format Rolleiflex and Rolleicord, with standard lenses, and carrying as extra equipment only a tripod and set of lens filters. She rarely used flash or added lighting, and then only using flash powder. She printed her own work and in Hong Kong she sold postcards of her views of city, mass-printed in her darkroom. In Sarawak, where the couple were without mains electricity, she had to power her enlarger lamp from car batteries, and she had improvise ways to protect her negatives from mould in the tropical humidity.

=== Reception ===
Michael Tomlinson reviewing in The Age Morrison's A Photographer in Old Peking notes its 'elegant architectural studies of temples and monasteries which have since been damaged or destroyed' and 'her great talent...for human interest studies...[from] a vanished world, alien and unfamiliar. And yet the faces peering out at us from the Peking market in the '30s are...human and appealing...'

Claire Roberts considers that "through her photographs of architecture, streetscapes, craftsmen, street vendors and customs, Morrison creates her own image of China. By focusing on labour-intensive traditional crafts and skills, old buildings, religious sites and ancient rites and practices she chooses to record the life and look of 'Old Peking'. In much the same way that she chose to photograph the German folk festival, in China Morrison chose to focus on 'traditional' Chinese life and values rather than those of a 'modem', changing world. She was motivated to record aspects of a foreign culture that she felt was threatened by development.

Anne Maxwell considers that Morrison's "two major books relating to her time in China...were aimed at capturing the 'Old Peking' that Westerners enjoyed reminiscing over, and they ignored the changing nature of the city, in...the poverty, civil unrest and social conflict that resulted from the Japanese occupation."

Nicholas Jose counters that: "When she styled herself A Photographer in Old Peking (1985), Hedda Morrison... implies more than a literal interpretation of those words. She finds herself, like a time-traveller, or a space-traveller, in a zone that has its own characteristics, in it but perhaps not of it, in Peking in the 1930s and '40s to record, with the signally modem technique of photography, the riches of a world that has existed proudly and splendidly apart from modernity, technology and Western civilisation and which will now only survive, tragically, in the records of the outsider...for Hedda Morrison being a photographer In Old Peking was more than an idle hobby. It was her role, her vocation."

Edward Stokes writes: 'For Hedda Hammer the craft of photography was uppermost, and through the pursuit of its demands her image making matured in China. Her style was marked by an intuitive sensibility to light; strong, often challenging vantage points; and fine, carefully balanced compositions. Equally important was her natural rapport with people...[with] a particular affinity to Chinese and other Asians.'

Graham Johnson in reviewing Hedda Morrison's Hong Kong in Pacific Affairs remarks that "the photographs are magnificent, although generally a little romanticized...a sensitively produced record, interpretation and ethnographic memoir of a Chinese place with global significance at a time that few now remember. No one except Hedda Morrison had the time, the skills and the facility to make permanent the memory of a time and place that no longer exist

In reference to Morrison's portrayal of people, John Townsend reviewing her book Sarawak praises her "loving and capable account of the peoples of that country, illustrated by the author's own admirable photographs."

== Recognition ==
In 1955, through the Camera Press agency which was handling her work, Edward Steichen saw Morrison's flash-lit photograph of a festive Dayak group in indigenous dress laughing with a young man in a western-style shirt and wearing a watch. He chose it for the section 'Adult Play' in the world-touring Museum of Modern Art exhibition The Family of Man, seen by 9 million viewers.

Subsequently, Morrison wrote two major books on Sarawak, Sarawak (1957) and Life in a Longhouse (1962).

== Legacy ==
Exhibitions of her works have been mounted in Singapore, the United States, and in Australia by the Australian National University, Canberra, the Canberra Photographic Society, the Powerhouse Museum, Sydney, and the National Library of Australia. Many of her images are archived in the Harvard-Yenching Library, Harvard University and at Cornell University, NY. There is a large collection of her German, Asian and Australian work in the Powerhouse Museum.

Hedda died, after a sudden illness, in Canberra in 1991, at the age of 82, and was cremated in Norwood. She was survived by her husband Alastair (1915-2009). Jack Waterford in Morrison's obituary described her as "a perky sparrow with.a wonderful dry wit and a touch of wickedness [who] practiced her art to the last."

== Exhibitions ==
- 1940: Hedda Morrison's Chinese Photographs. Central Park, Peking, China.
- 1947: Hedda Morrison Chinese photographs, Chinese Institute, Gordon Square, London
- 1949, 15 July–11 September: : Photographs by Hedda Morrison, Brooklyn Museum, New York.
- 1954, July: Sarawak photographs by Hedda Morrison, Kingsway, London
- 1955: included in The Family of Man at the Museum of Modern Art, New York City.
- 1957: Photographs of Sarawak, Raffles Museum, Singapore, curated by Prof. Gibson-Hill
- 1958, 17 March – 22 April: Photographs of Sarawak, Santa Fe Folk Art Museum, touring from Raffles Museum, Singapore
- 1959, 18–24 October: Photographs of Sarawak, Milne Library, State University College of Education, Geneseo
- 1964, from 12 April: Chinese Peasant Cottons, including photographs by Hedda Morrison, Museum of New Mexico, Folk Art Building
- 1967: Peking: 1933-1946 - A Photographic Impression, Menzies Library, Australian National University, Canberra, ACT.
- 1986, 12–15 May: 'An Asian Experience: 1933-6'. Photographs by Hedda Morrison', organised by the Asian Studies Association of Australia, Fisher Library Foyer, University of Sydney.
- 1990: Travels of an Extraordinary Photographer: Hedda Morrison - A Retrospective Exhibition, organised by the Canberra Photographic Society, The Link, Canberra Theatre, Canberra, ACT.

=== Posthumous ===
- 1993: In Her View: The Photographs of Hedda Morrison in China and Sarawak 1933-67, curator Claire Roberts Powerhouse Museum, Sydney, NSW.
- 1994: In Her View: The Photographs of Hedda Morrison in China and Sarawak 1933-67, National Library of Australia, Canberra, ACT.
- 1995: 8 photographs of the Flinders Ranges (c.1971) featured in Beyond the Picket Fence, National Library of Australia, Canberra, ACT.
- 1995, March - April: Included in Women Hold Up Half The Sky, opened by the Hon. Dr Carmen Lawrence. National Gallery of Australia, Canberra
- 2002: Old Peking: Photographs by Hedda Morrison 1933-46, Powerhouse Museum, Sydney, NSW.
- 2002, May–June: Old Peking: Photographs by Hedda Morrison 1933-46, Art Museum of the China Millennium Monument, Beijing.

== Collections ==
- National Gallery of Australia
- National Library of Australia
- National Gallery of Victoria
- Powerhouse Museum, Sydney
- Harvard-Yenching Library Collections: The Hedda Morrison Photographs of China
- Cornell University Library Division of Rare and Manuscript Collections, Hedda Morrison photographs, [ca. 1950-1985]

== Publications ==
- Morrison, Hedda. Sarawak.London: Macgibbon & Kee, 1957.
- ---. Life in a Longhouse. Kuching: Borneo Literature Bureau, 1962.
- ---. Sarawak, Donald Morre Press, Singapore, 1965.
- ---. A Photographer in Old Peking. Hong Kong: Oxford University Press, 1985.
- ---. Travels of a Photographer in China, 1933 - 1946. Hong Kong: Oxford University Press, 1987.
- ---. 'Some Musical Instruments of China', Arts of Asia, May–June 1983, pp. 83–95.
- ---. 'Tribal Crafts of Borneo', Arts of Asia, Jan-Feb 1972, pp. 61–66.
- ---. 'Jungle Journeys in Sarawak', The National Geographic Magazine, no. 109, May 1956, pp. 710–736.
- ---. 'Educating the Peoples of Sarawak', The Crown Colonist, January 1950, pp. 36–37.
- ---. 'Craftsmen in a Harsh Environment', Arts of Asia, March–April 1982, pp. 87–95.
- ---. 'The Lost Tribe of China', Arts of Asia, May–June 1980, pp. 82–91.
- Museum of Applied Arts & Sciences. "Folklore studies booklet". Museum of Applied Arts & Sciences, Australia.
- Morrison, Hedda and Morrison, Alistair, 'Chinese Toggles: A Little Known Folk Art', Arts of Asia, March–April 1986, pp. 68–74.
- Kates, George N. (George Norbert); Morrison, Hedda, 1908-1991; Bieber, Caroline F. (Caroline Frances) (1962), Chinese household furniture ([Facsimile reprint ed.] ed.), Dover Publications, ISBN 978-0-486-20958-6 ;
- Hoffman, Alfred and Morrison, Hedda, Nanking, Verlag von Max Noessler, Shanghai, 1945.
- George N. Kates (1952), The years that were fat Peking, 1933-1940 ([1st ed.] ed.), New York Harper
- Eberhard, Wolfram and Hedda Morrison. Hua Shan: the Taoist Sacred Mountain in West China. Hong Kong: Vetch and Lee, 1973.
- Morrison, Hedda, K. F. Wong and Leigh Wright. Vanishing World, The Ibans of Borneo. New York: John Weatherhill, 1972.

== Publications about ==
- Cheung, S. (2007). Review, The China Journal, (58), 146-147. doi:10.2307/20066317
- Foret, P. (2002). Revue Bibliographique De Sinologie, 20, nouvelle série, 176-177.
- Genest, G. (1994). Les Palais européens du Yuanmingyuan: Essai sur la végétation dans les jardins. Arts Asiatiques, 49, 82-90.
- Henriot, C. (2007). Preamble "Common People and the Artist in Republican China: Visual Documents and Historical Narrative". European Journal of East Asian Studies, 6(1), 5-11.
- Johnson, G. (2011). Review, Journal of the Royal Asiatic Society Hong Kong Branch, 51, 315-323.
- Lum, Raymond. ‘Hedda Morrison and Her Photographs of China.’ In Treasures of the Yenching: Seventy-Fifth Anniversary of the Harvard-Yenching Library. Exhibition Catalogue, edited by Patrick Hanan, 297–300. Hong Kong: Chinese University Press, 2003
- Lum, Raymond and Rubie Watson. 'Camera Sinica: China Photographs in the Harvard-Yenching library and the Peabody Museum of Archaeology and Ethnology' in Patrick Hanan (ed). Treasures of the Yenching: Seventy-fifth Anniversary of the Harvard-Yenching Library, Exhibition Catalogue. Cambridge: Harvard-Ycnching Library, Harvard University, 2003.
- Newman, Cathy, Women Photographers at National Geographic, National Geographic Society, Washington, D.C., c2000.
- Roberts, Claire. ‘China Bound: Hedda Hammer.’ Harvard Library Bulletin 23, no. 3 (2012): 50–51
- Roberts, Claire (ed). In Her View, The Photographs of Hedda Morrison in China and Sarawak 1933 - 67. Haymarket, NSW: Powerhouse Publishing, Museum of Applied Arts and Sciences, 1993.
- Roberts, Claire. In Her View: Hedda Morrison's Photographs of Peking, 1933–46, East Asian History, Number 4 (Dec. 1992), pp. 81
- Roberts, Claire. 'Hedda Morrison's Jehol - A Photographic Journey', East Asian History, Number 22 (Dec. 2001), pp. 1–128. Canberra: Institute of Advanced Studies, Australian National University
- Roberts, Claire (2013), Photography and China, Reaktion Books, ISBN 978-1-86189-911-8
- Stokes, Edward (2009). Hong Kong As It Was, Hedda Morrison's Photographs 1946 – 47. Hong Kong: The Photographic Heritage Foundation with Hong Kong University Press. ISBN 978-962-209-966-1.
- Stokes, Edward (2015). Hedda Morrison's Hong Kong: Photographs & Impressions 1946–47. Hong Kong: Hong Kong Conservation Photography Foundation with Hong Kong University Press. ISBN 978-962-209-754-4.
- Thiriez, R. (1990). Les Palais européens du Yuanmingyuan à travers la photographie : 1860-1940. Arts Asiatiques, 45, 90-96.
- Thiriez, Régine (1998), Barbarian lens : western photographers of the Qianlong emperor's European palaces, Gordon and Breach Publishers, ISBN 978-0-429-23914-4
- T.T. (1972). The Journal of Asian Studies, 32(1), 227-227. doi:10.2307/2053265
- Waterford, Jack. ‘Photographic Chronicler of Pre-Communist China.’ Canberra Times, 5 December 1991, 7
- Werle, H. (1974). Journal of the Hong Kong Branch of the Royal Asiatic Society, 14, 235-236.
- Yeh, W. (2007). Introductory Remarks "Reading Photographs: Visual Culture and Everyday Life in Republican China". European Journal of East Asian Studies, 6(1), 1-3.
- Yi, F. (2007). Shop Signs and Visual Culture in Republican Beijing. European Journal of East Asian Studies, 6(1), 103-128.

== Awards ==
- 1965: Pegawai Bitang Sarawak (Officer of the Order of the Star of Sarawak) for her work by the Sarawak Government
- 1990: Canberra Photographic Society Life Member.
