= The Howerd Confessions =

1976 British TV comedy series

- Genre: Comedy
- Written by: Dave Freeman; Dick Hills; Peter Robinson; Hugh Stuckey
- Directed by: Michael Mills
- Starring: Frankie Howerd; Joan Sims
- Composer: Peter Knight
- No. of seasons: 1
- No. of episodes: 6

Production
- Producer: Michael Mills
- Running time: 30 minutes
- Production company: Thames Television

Original release
- Network: ITV
- Release: 2 September – 7 October 1976

The Howerd Confessions is a British comedy television series that originally aired between 2 September and 7 October 1976 on ITV. It featured comedian Frankie Howerd "confessing" various indiscretions.

Each of the 6 episodes was a self-contained, untitled, playlet.

The director/producer was Michael Mills, with scripts by Dave Freeman, Dick Hills, Hugh Stuckey and Peter Robinson.

In 2007, the entire series was released on dvd by Freemantle Home Entertainment.

In 2021, the series was broadcast in the UK on the Freeview/Sky/Freesat channel, ' That's TV Xmas U.K '.

== Select cast ==
- Frankie Howerd as Frankie [all episodes]
- Joan Sims as Nellie / Matron / Mrs Beachum [episodes 1, 3 and 4]
- Caroline Munro as Captain Latour [episode 2]
- Madeline Smith as Nurse [episode 3]
- John Junkin as Sergeant [episode 4]
- Linda Thorson as Eve [episode 5]
- Alfie Bass as Chalky White [episode 5]
- Alan Curtis as Sgt Hardman [episode 5]
- April Olrich as Deirdre [episode 6]
- Sarah Douglas as Lola [episode 6]
- Cyril Appleton as Sergeant [episode 2]
- Dorothy Frere as Miss. Pettigrew [episode 1]
