= The Passionate Pilgrim (1984 film) =

- Directed by: Charles Wallace
- Written by: Charles Wallace
- Starring: Eric Morecambe; Tom Baker; Madeline Smith
- Narrated by: John Le Mesurier
- Cinematography: Nicholas Struthers
- Music by: Alwyn Green
- Distributed by: United International Pictures
- Release date: 1984
- Running time: 25 minutes
- Country: United Kingdom
- Language: English

The Passionate Pilgrim is a 1984 short feature film starring Eric Morecambe, Tom Baker and Madeline Smith notable for being Morecambe's last work, and one of few not to feature his long-term partner Ernie Wise. The film takes the setting of a silent film with narration provided by John Le Mesurier of Dad's Army fame, this too was some of his last work prior to his death in 1983. The film centres on a Lord who lives in a castle (the film was made entirely on location at Hever Castle) and his Lady, the latter of whom attracts the amorous attentions of the titular character. The plot centres on the pilgrim's failed attempts to gain entry to the castle by any means possible, and the lengths the lord will go to in order to stop him. In one memorable scene once the assailant has gained entry the lord brandishes an aerosol can labelled "Knight-Rid" to stop the pilgrim in his tracks

Further filming at Hever was planned for May 1984 as filmmaker Charles Wallace intended to expand the film using Beryl Reid to play Eric's mother, and another damsel in the cast. Morecambe's death ensured that further scenes were not made, but the film was released in its original shorter form. The film was released with the James Bond movie Octopussy and WarGames (see production company website movingimageco.com). It was later shown on numerous cable TV channels and was released in 1994 on VHS at a time of resurgence in interest in the work of Morecambe and Wise, the BBC having screened a three (late expanded to five) part tribute to mark the tenth anniversary of his death. It has subsequently also been released on DVD and is widely available.
