= Madeline Smith =

English actress (born 1949)

- Born: 2 August 1949 (age 77); Hartfield, Wealden, East Sussex, England
- Occupations: Actress; model
- Years active: 1967–1986; 2011–present
- Spouse: David Buck (m. 1988; died 1989)
- Children: 1

Madeline Smith (born 2 August 1949) is an English actress. After working as a model in the late 1960s, she went on to appear in many television series and stage productions, as well as comedy and horror films, in the 1970s and 1980s.

Smith played Bond girl Miss Caruso in Live and Let Die (1973), but also had larger roles in the horror films The Vampire Lovers (1970), Taste the Blood of Dracula (1970), Tam Lin (1970), Theatre of Blood (1973) and Frankenstein and the Monster from Hell (1974), and comedy films including Up Pompeii (1971), Up the Front (1972) and Carry On Matron (1972) among others. She also appeared in the films The Killing of Sister George (1968), Pussycat, Pussycat, I Love You (1970), The Amazing Mr. Blunden (1972), and the musical film Take Me High (1973) with Cliff Richard.

After leaving the acting profession in the mid-1980s to raise her family, she returned to acting in 2011.

== Early life ==
Smith was born in Hartfield, Sussex, the only child of Robert and Ursula Smith (née Boas). Her father owned an antiques shop and painting restoration business near Kew Gardens, and her Swiss mother was a translator. Smith received a convent school education.

In her late teens, she held a temporary job at Biba, a boutique located on Kensington High Street, London. At the instigation of Barbara Hulanicki, founder of Biba, Smith became a model.

In the late 1960s and early 1970s, she was regularly featured in the work of Disc cartoonist J. Edward Oliver, who on one occasion devoted an entire strip to her entitled "The Life and Habits of the Madeline Smith".

== Career ==
Smith's first screen role was a small part in the film Escalation (1968), followed by a role in The Mini-Affair (1967), although the latter was released first. Smith first worked for Hammer Film Productions in Taste the Blood of Dracula (1970), billed as Maddy Smith and playing an East End prostitute. Among her other film appearances, she played opposite Ava Gardner in Tam Lin, Peter Cushing in The Vampire Lovers and Frankenstein and the Monster from Hell, Diana Dors in The Amazing Mr Blunden, Frankie Howerd in Up Pompeii and Up the Front, and Vincent Price in Theatre of Blood. In 1972, Smith appeared in Carry On Matron in a scene alongside Hattie Jacques, Barbara Windsor, and Joan Sims.

In 1973, she played the Bond girl Miss Caruso in the post-opening titles sequence of Live and Let Die, the first James Bond film starring Roger Moore. Smith's role is therefore significant as Miss Caruso is the first Bond girl of the Roger Moore era. Smith and Moore take part in a scene in which he unzips her dress with a magnetic wristwatch. She was recommended for the role by Moore himself, having previously appeared with him in an episode of the television series The Persuaders!.

Smith's numerous stage credits include working with US director Charles Marowitz on Blue Comedy (Yvonne Arnaud Theatre, Guildford) and The Snob (at Marowitz's Tottenham Court Road venue the Open Space). She also acted opposite Alec Guinness in the original West End production of Alan Bennett's Habeas Corpus (playing Felicity Rumpers), supported Frankie Howerd again in the Volpone adaptation The Fly and the Fox (Churchill Theatre, Bromley), played Elma in a Cambridge Theatre Company revival of Frederick Lonsdale's Canaries Sometimes Sing, and spent two years playing the female lead in Agatha Christie's The Mousetrap at the St Martin's Theatre.

Her television credits include Doctor at Large (1971), The Two Ronnies (appearing in the serial Hampton Wick, 1971), Clochemerle (1972), His and Hers (1970) with Tim Brooke-Taylor, Casanova '73 (1973) with Leslie Phillips, Steptoe and Son (1974), The Howerd Confessions (1976), Why Didn't They Ask Evans? (1980), and The Steam Video Company (1984). She also featured in two episodes of All Creatures Great and Small, as two different characters (as Angela Farmer in "Pride of Possession" (1978) and as Anne Grantley in the 1983 Christmas special). She was a member of the regular cast of the BBC2 series The End of the Pier Show (1974) and In the Looking Glass (1978) alongside satirists John Wells and John Fortune and composer Carl Davis. Smith also starred in The Passionate Pilgrim (1984), which was the final screen appearance of Eric Morecambe.

After the birth of her daughter in 1984, Smith gradually wound down her career to give her time to raise her. In 2009, Smith was interviewed in, and was the cover star of, the coffee-table book Hammer Glamour. She returned to acting in 2011 with an appearance in an episode of Doctors. She then followed this with a role in a docu-drama marking the 100th anniversary of the sinking of the Titanic before starring in the miniseries Dancing on the Edge (2013) and appearing in an episode of Not Going Out in 2014. In 2015, she appeared as a contestant on the red team in the BBC antiques gameshow Bargain Hunt. In December 2018, she appeared in episode 4 of the Christmas series of Celebrity Mastermind with the history of Kew Gardens as her specialist subject.

In 2026, Philip Bujak and Smith co-authored her memoirs, titled Madeline Smith, Bond Girl.

== Personal life ==
Smith's partner was the actor David Buck, whom she met in 1974. They were together until he died from cancer in 1989. The couple had a daughter, born in 1984.

== Filmography ==
=== Film ===
Year	Title	Role	Notes
1968	The Mini-Affair	Samantha	
1968	Escalation	Girl on bicycle	uncredited
1968	The Killing of Sister George	Nun	uncredited
1969	Come Back Peter	Miss Beaufort-Smith	
1970	Pussycat, Pussycat, I Love You	Gwendolyn	
1970	Taste the Blood of Dracula	Dolly	
1970	The Vampire Lovers	Emma Morton	
1970	Tam Lin	Sue	
1971	Up Pompeii	Erotica	
1971	The Magnificent Seven Deadly Sins	Girl	
1971	Mr. Forbush and the Penguins	Unknown	scene cut
1972	Carry On Matron	Mrs. Pullitt	
1972	Up the Front	Fanny	
1972	The Amazing Mr Blunden	Bella	
1973	The Love Ban	Miss Partridge	
1973	Theatre of Blood	Rosemary	
1973	Live and Let Die	Miss Caruso	
1973	Take Me High	Vicki	
1974	Frankenstein and the Monster from Hell	Sarah	
1974	Percy's Progress	Miss UK	
1975	Galileo	Young Lady	
1976	The Bawdy Adventures of Tom Jones	Sophia	
1976	Shadows of Doubt	Girl	
1977	Fern, the Red Deer	Mrs. Gordon	
1977	The Quality Connection	Wendy	
1980	Why Didn't They Ask Evans?	Moira Nicholson	
1981	Late Flowering Love	Girl	
1984	The Passionate Pilgrim	Damsel	
2019	Up Pompeii!	Ammonia	
2020	Crazy Bitch Blues	Alison	
2020	Jeepers Creepers	Fantasy Lover	voice
2021	The Amazing Mr. Blunden	Geraldine	
2026	The Alice Paradox	Angela Hobbes	

=== Television ===
Year	Title	Role	Notes
1969	Who-Dun-It	Gwynneth Evans	Episode: "Murder Goes to School"
1969	Cribbins		6 episodes
1970	His and Hers	Janet Burgess	6 episodes
1970	On the House	Angela	Episode: "A Little Bit on the Side"
1970	The Adventures of Don Quick	Leonie	Episode: "The Love Reflector"
1971	Doctor at Large	Sue Maxwell	5 episodes
1971	The Mind of Mr. J.G. Reeder	Miss Clutterbuck	Episode: "The Willing Victim"
1971	Hine	Patricia Harris	Episode: "The Little White Lady"
1971	The Two Ronnies	Henrietta Beckett	8 episodes
1971	The Persuaders!	Carla I	Episode: "The Long Goodbye"
1971	Jason King	Jonquil	2 episodes
1972	Clochemerle	Hortense Girodot	3 episodes
1972	ITV Sunday Night Theatre	Mary Todd	Episode: "Madly in Love"
1972	Them		Episode: "#1.2"
1972	Milligan in...	Various	Episode: "Milligan in Autumn"
1972	Harriet's Back in Town	Diane	2 episodes
1973	The Fenn Street Gang	Miss Bedwell	Episode: "Business Deficiency"
1973	Ooh La La!	Julie	Episode: "A Pig in a Poke"
1973	Casanova '73	Tessa Finlay	Episode: "#1.6"
1974	Crown Court	Patricia Drake	Episode: "Falling Stars: Part 1"
1974	Wodehouse Playhouse / Comedy Playhouse	Aurelia Cammerleigh	Episode: "The Reverend Wooing of Archibald: Pilot"
1974	Happy Ever After	Sally Thompson	Episode: "Amateur Dramatics"
1974	Steptoe and Son	Carol	Episode: "Back in Fashion"
1974	Rooms	Fran	2 episodes
1974–1976	The End of the Pier Show	Various	All 7 episodes
1975	A Touch of the Casanovas	Teresa	TV film
1976	My Brother's Keeper	Angela Lloyd	Episode: "Tooling Up"
1976	The Howerd Confessions	The Nurse	Episode: "#1.3"
1976	Going For A Song	Herself	Episode: 27 August
1977	Big Boy Now!	Debbie Longhurst	Episode: "Mr and Mrs"
1977	Romance	Peggy	Episode: "The Black Knight"
1978	In the Looking Glass	Various	All 6 episodes
1978	All Creatures Great and Small	Angela Farmer	Episode: "Pride of Possession"
1980	Feelifax	Fridge	Voice
1980	The Bagthorpe Saga	Aunt Celia	3 episodes
1981	Funny Man	Prunella	Episode: "Letting Go"
1982	A.J. Wentworth, B.A.	Mrs. Hillman	Episode: "Founder's Day"
1982–1986	Eureka	Various	All 32 episodes
1983	All Creatures Great and Small	Anne Grantley	Episode: "1983 Special"
1984	The Steam Video Company	Various	All 6 episodes
1985	The Pickwick Papers	Miss Nupkins	Episode: "#1.7"
2011	Doctors	Rita Prentice	Episode: "Whip Hand"
2012	Titanic: Southampton Remembers	Maud Newman	TV film
2013	Dancing on the Edge	Violetta	2 episodes
2014	Not Going Out	Party Guest	Episode: "Christening"
2021	The Amazing Mr. Blunden	Geraldine	TV film

== Bibliography ==
- Paul, Louis (2008). "Madeline Smith". Tales From the Cult Film Trenches; Interviews with 36 Actors from Horror, Science Fiction and Exploitation Cinema. Detroit: Wayne State University Press. pp. 214–220. ISBN 978-0-7864-2994-3.
- Kay-Bujak, Philip (2026) Madeline Smith, Bond Girl: from 60's fashion model to half a century on stage & screen, White Owl Publishers ISBN 978-1-0361-4866-9
