= Tom Hopkinson =

British journalist, picture magazine editor, author, and teacher

Sir Thomas Hopkinson
- Born: Henry Thomas Hopkinson; 19 April 1905; Manchester, England
- Died: 20 June 1990 (aged 85); Oxford, England
- Other names: Tom Hopkinson, Thomas Pembroke
- Education: Pembroke College, Oxford.
- Occupations: Journalist and picture editor.
- Spouses: Antonia White, Gerti Deutsch, Dorothy Hopkinson
- Children: Amanda Hopkinson (1947–)
- Relatives: Sir Alfred Hopkinson, K.C. (grandfather)

Sir Henry Thomas Hopkinson CBE (19 April 1905 – 20 June 1990) was a British journalist, picture magazine editor, author, and teacher.

== Early life ==
Born in Manchester, his father was John Hopkinson, a Church of England clergyman and a scholar, and his mother had been a school mistress. Hopkinson attended prep school on the Lancashire coast and then St Edward's School, Oxford. From there he went to Pembroke College, Oxford, reading Classical Moderations (Class II, 1925) and Greats (Class III, 1927). His philosophy tutor for Greats was R. G. Collingwood.

== Early work ==
Tom Hopkinson first worked in advertising and publicity, then became a magazine assistant editor in 1934. He was soon working for Stefan Lorant on Weekly Illustrated magazine, and wrote short stories and novels during his free time. He also assisted Lorant on Lilliput magazine, and then on Picture Post magazine from 1938 to 1940. When Lorant left permanently for America in July 1940, Hopkinson became editor of Picture Post, in 1940, remaining until 1950. It was Hopkinson who began photojournalist Bert Hardy's connection with Picture Post. Another colleague there was Jeffrey Mark.

== Middle career ==
Hopkinson defended his staff's editorial independence fiercely, and his publisher, Sir Edward Hulton, a Conservative Party member for most of his career, did not always appreciate Hopkinson's left-wing views, which affected Picture Post more strongly than the occasional right-wing views which also found their way into that magazine.

While working for the Picture Post in the Congo, Hopkinson reportedly saved a man's life by standing over him to prevent a mob beating the man to death.

In October 1950, after photojournalist Bert Hardy and writer James Cameron returned to London from their Korean War coverage, Hopkinson tried to go to press with their coverage of United Nations atrocities in Pusan. Hulton stopped the presses, fearing that coverage would "give aid and comfort to the enemy". Hopkinson persisted and Hulton sacked him. During the next six and one-half years, Picture Post was led by a revolving door of editors, many of whom did not do well for the magazine, which had been the leading picture magazine in Britain during World War II and for at least five years thereafter.

In 1953 his book "George Orwell" was published as #39 in the National Book League's series "Writers and Their Work", "the first serious Orwell biography".

Hopkinson became editor of South Africa's Drum magazine in 1958. He worked with writers like Can Themba, Casey Motsisi and Nat Nakasa. He encouraged the South Africa photojournalist Peter Magubane, who was covering the anti-apartheid struggle. He travelled regularly to Ghana and Nigeria during this time, organising the local editions of Drum. Hopkinson provided the textual material for the South African volume of the Life World Library published by Time Inc in 1965. Hopkinson wrote a recollection of his time as editor of Drum in a memoir titled In the Fiery Continent.

== Later career ==
When Hopkinson left Drum, he went on to teach journalism in British universities and studied United States journalism schools. In 1969 he was in Malta advising on the setting up of a Journalism course. He was founding director of the Centre for Journalism Studies at University College Cardiff, from 1970 to 1975. Later, he returned to Oxford. He continued his habit of writing short stories, novels, and also wrote a memoir, Of This Our Time, about his life from 1905 up to 1950. He was knighted by Queen Elizabeth II in 1978.

== Family life ==
Hopkinson married three times; his wives were Antonia White (m. 1930), Gerti Deutsch (m. 1938) and Dorothy Kingsmill née Vernon (m. 1953). He was the father of three children:

- (by Antonia White), Lyndall Hopkinson Passerini
- (by Gert Deutsch), Nicolette Hopkinson Roeske and Amanda Hopkinson Caistor

== Other works ==
Hopkinson and his last wife, Dorothy, co-authored Much Silence (Gollancz, 1974), a biography of Meher Baba. He and Dorothy met Baba in London in 1952, became devotees, and were considerably influenced by him. Lady Hopkinson died in August 1993, and Hopkinson later rewrote and expanded their work on Baba into a larger version, The Silent Messenger: The Life & Work of Meher Baba, which was completed but apparently never published.
