= Fyfe Robertson =

Scottish broadcaster and journalist

- Born: James Robertson; 19 August 1902; Edinburgh, Scotland
- Died: 4 February 1987 (aged 84); Eastbourne, East Sussex, England
- Occupation: Television journalist
- Spouse(s): Elizabeth Smith Muir (m. 1926; died 1973) Vera Ford (m. 1978)
- Children: 2, including Grace

James "Fyfe" Robertson (19 August 1902 – 4 February 1987) was a Scottish television journalist and broadcaster.

== Biography ==
Robertson was born at 8:30am on 19 August 1902 at 35 Shandon Crescent in the District of St. George, in the city of Edinburgh, Scotland. He was one of six children of Jane (née Dunlop) and James Robertson, a miner who became a minister in the United Free Church of Scotland. He attended the High School of Glasgow.

== Career ==
After briefly studying medicine at Glasgow University, he became a reporter with the Glasgow Herald, then Shrewsbury Chronicle (1921) and later, in London with the Daily Herald and Daily Express.

In 1943 Robertson joined Picture Post magazine where he was picture editor and feature writer. His investigative abilities led to a crucial exposé of the Tanganyika groundnut scheme. His report was quoted in the House of Commons.

When Picture Post closed in 1957, he went to work in television. He is chiefly remembered for his association with the BBC programme Tonight. His bearded, haggard face topped by a tweed trilby hat and a slow over-emphatic Scottish voice became well known (usually introducing his reportage with a characteristic "Hello there, I'm Fyfe Robertson"), which led to parodies on radio comedy shows: firstly by Bill Pertwee on Beyond Our Ken as "Rife Hoverton"; as "Forth Robinson" in The Men from the Ministry; and also by Graeme Garden (a fellow Scot) on I'm Sorry, I'll Read That Again, who began every item with an alleged Robertson catchphrase "I'm standing here...". Another of his frequently used phrases that was parodied was "I don't know, I really don't know". For Tonight Robertson travelled widely providing serious stories as well as finding some remarkable eccentrics; he was often described as "our roving reporter".

He appeared briefly as himself in the comedy film What a Whopper (1961).

When Tonight was replaced by 24 Hours, Robertson continued in his same investigative manner. He presented a series for BBC Television, Brush Off the Dust, in which he visited several British museums, commenting on their collections, and in 1975 presented Robbie, which ran for three series until 1980.

Despite being a heavy smoker, he remained in good health and in his late 60s took part in two exhausting televised expeditions, crossing the Scottish Highlands on horseback and paddling down the Severn in a canoe.

== Personal life ==
He married Elizabeth (Betty) (née Muir) on 17 December 1926 in Lanark and the couple had two daughters, Elizabeth, a singer and conductor, and Grace, a well-known photographer. Betty died in 1973. Robertson married Vera Ford in 1978. In 1986 he experienced a heart attack shortly after appearing as a guest on This is Your Life for Cliff Michelmore and died in Eastbourne in 1987.
