= In the Looking Glass =

1978 British TV comedy series

- Opening titles
- Genre: Surreal comedy
- Directed by: Andrew Gosling
- Starring: John Wells; John Fortune; Madeline Smith
- Country of origin: United Kingdom
- Original language: English
- No. of episodes: 6

Production
- Producer: Ian Keill

Original release
- Network: BBC Two
- Release: 17 January – 21 February 1978

In the Looking Glass is a surreal television series, broadcast on BBC2 in 1978. It starred John Wells, John Fortune, and Madeline Smith, was directed by Andrew Gosling and produced by Ian Keill. The music for the songs was composed by Carl Davis. The animations and illustrations were by Graham McCallum and Bob Gale. The same team had previously created 1974's The End of the Pier Show. Wells, Fortune and Davis appear to have been the main writers for both series.

In the Looking Glass was notable for its design, overlaying live action and drawn or animated backgrounds, for instance, a hole drilled to the centre of the earth, or the Monopoly board on which a character risks being crushed by rolling dice. The production team (Keill, Gosling and designer Graham McCallum) went on to develop this approach further in the "live action comic strip" series Jane (1982), for which McCallum won two BAFTA Best Graphics awards.

== Awards ==
In the Looking Glass was nominated for the "Most Original Programme/Series" BAFTA award for 1979 (the award was won by Pennies from Heaven).

== Episode list ==
Broadcast dates:

- Deserts (17 January 1978) – guest Harold Berens
- Space (24 January 1978) – guests Richard Murdoch, Ruth Kettlewell and Gillian Gregory
- Fading Away (31 January 1978) – guests John Bird and David Battley
- Atlantis (7 February 1978) – guest Terence Bayler
- The Centre of the Earth (14 February 1978) – guests Valentine Dyall, Bob Hoskins and John Dair
- Monopoly (21 February 1978) – guests Anna Quayle, Howard Goorney and Rita Webb
