= Lilliput (magazine) =

British art and literature magazine

- The December 1946 issue of Lilliput
- Frequency: Monthly
- Publisher: Pocket Publications
- Founder: Stefan Lorant
- Founded: 1937
- First issue: 1937
- Final issue: 1960
- Country: United Kingdom
- Based in: London
- Language: English

Lilliput was a small-format British monthly magazine of humour, short stories, photographs and the arts, founded in 1937 by the photojournalist Stefan Lorant. The first issue came out in July and it was sold shortly after to Edward Hulton, when editorship was taken over by Tom Hopkinson in 1940: his assistant editor from 1941 to 1948 was Kaye Webb. During the 1950s Lilliput was edited by Jack Hargreaves. It had a reputation for publishing what were, for the time, fairly daring photographs of female nudes.

Contributors included Nigel Balchin, H. E. Bates, Gordon Beckles, Sir Max Beerbohm, James Boswell, Bill Brandt, Brassaï, Patrick Campbell, Barbara Comyns, Aleister Crowley, Robert Doisneau, Dominick Elwes, Ronald Ferns, C. S. Forester, John Glashan, Zoltán Glass, Robert Graves, Michael Heath, Sydney Jacobson, C.E.M. Joad, Constant Lambert, Ergy Landau, Lee Miller, Nancy Mitford, Bill Naughton, Stephen Potter, V. S. Pritchett, E. Arnot Robertson, Murray Sayle, Ronald Searle, Sir Sacheverell Sitwell, and Ylla.

The first 147 issues (until late 1949) had covers illustrated by Walter Trier with each design depicting a man, a woman, and a small Scottish Terrier dog in various situations and periods.

In August 1960 Lilliput was absorbed into Men Only (which only later became pornographic).

Lilliput Review, an American periodical that started in 1989, is unrelated.
