= Maggie O'Kane =

Irish filmmaker and journalist

Maggie O'Kane is an Irish journalist and documentary film maker. She has been most associated with The Guardian newspaper where she was a foreign correspondent who filed graphic stories from Sarajevo while it was under siege between 1992 and 1996. She also contributed to the BBC from Bosnia. She has been editorial director of GuardianFilms, the paper's film unit, since 2004. Since 2017, she has been chair of the Board of the European Press Prize.

== Education ==
O'Kane received her secondary education at Loreto Convent, Balbriggan, County Dublin, Ireland, and her third-level education at the College of Commerce (now Technological University Dublin) where she completed a journalism diploma. She received a B.A. degree in Politics and History at University College Dublin before studying at the Institut des Journalistes en Europe in Paris.

== Career ==
From 1982 to 1984, O'Kane worked for the Sunday Tribune in Dublin and then in 1984 to 1989 for RTÉ. She then covered Eastern Europe as a freelance journalist contributing to The Economist, The Sunday Times, The Guardian, The Irish Times and Mail on Sunday. From 1992 to 1996, she covered the Bosnian War for The Guardian. Since 2003 she has been the editorial director for Guardian Films.

In its first three years, the company made 30 films – mostly for television – including the Baghdad Blogger reports, featuring Baghdad resident 'Salam Pax' – whose blog Where is Raed? was printed in The Guardian and New York Times during the occupation of his city. They were shown on BBC Two's Newsnight programme. Some of these were also shown in 2007 in two collections by CNN International.

Kane was also reporter in Sex on the Streets, made by GuardianFilms for the UK's Channel 4 television channel. It focussed on violence against women working as prostitutes. She was also reporter in the company's Spiked – also for Channel 4 – about the use date rape drugs.

On 15 March 2013, it was reported by the Real News Network that O'Kane had just finished producing a documentary for GuardianFilms on the investigation of the war crimes committed in Iraq on behalf of the Bush administration, focusing on the roles played in the trickle-down military system. She argues, through her documentary, that the United States army, to quell Sunni rebellion and insurgency, armed and funded national, radical Shia militants to aid them in quelling Sunni insurgency. Subsequently, this Shia "police force" came to number approximately 12,000 men and are reported to have acted as, not containment forces, but as death squads, their killings reaching 3,000 per month at their height.

== Awards ==
- 1992 UK Journalist of the Year
- 1993 Amnesty International UK Media Awards with Ed Vulliamy, The Guardian for reports from Yugoslavia.
- 1996 James Camer Memorusing ial Trust Award for Journalism,
- 1999 Shortlisted, the t Internati.oIal UK Media Awards; Shortlisted as Feature Writer o the Year at the British Press Awards
- 2002: European Journalist of the Year
- 2018: 'Irish Red Cross journalism excellence award'
