= Marcus Lyon =

British artist (born 1965)

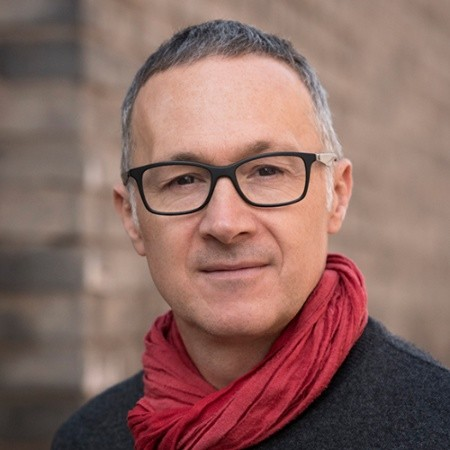
- Born: 22 August 1965 (age 61); Exeter, UK
- Occupations: Artist; photographer
- Known for: A Human Atlas
- Website: marcuslyon.com

Marcus Lyon (born 22 August 1965) is a London-based artist and photographer known for his portraiture and landscape work. Lyon is known for his research-based, self-published art books and exhibitions from the Human Atlas series. His works and publications are held in both private and international collections, including National Air and Space Museum of the Smithsonian Institution, the Detroit Institute of Arts, the Art Institute of Chicago, The Menil Collection and the Arts Council of Great Britain.

== Life and work ==
Lyon was born in Exeter, UK. His father was an industrialist and his mother a writer. He received his first camera at the age of 13 as a gift. He was raised in rural England in Amberley, West Sussex. His early years were much influenced by time spent observing the artistic community built by Alan Caiger-Smith at the Aldermaston Pottery.

After studying Political Science at Leeds University founded the Glassworks Studio as an atelier and production house for his commissioned and personal work. As a portrait artist, Lyon has photographed a diverse range of public figures from Queen Elizabeth II, four British Prime Ministers, actor Bill Nighy and film director Fernando Meirelles.

His early work was much influenced by commissioned work for Amnesty International in Guatemala and subsequent projects with Non-Profits working with street children across South America, Africa and Asia.

His focus on social impact photography led to leadership roles at the International Children's Trust and the Consortium for Street Children where he led turn-around work to refocus the organisations. He has also served as a board director of the Somerset House Trust and Leader's Quest.

After the millennium he turned his attention to his artwork and produced bodies of work on globalisation and science, such as: the BRIC's, Exodus, Timeout and Intersection, Optogenome and Fuel series.

In 2014 Lyon he founded the Human Atlas initiative: a body of work bringing science and art together through images, sound and DNA. In this work his studio creates books and exhibitions that study nominated groups of people in specified geographies through the lens of portraits, app-based image-activated soundscapes and ancestral DNA maps. To date, the team has created projects on Brazil, Germany, and Detroit - with two further atlases currently in production.

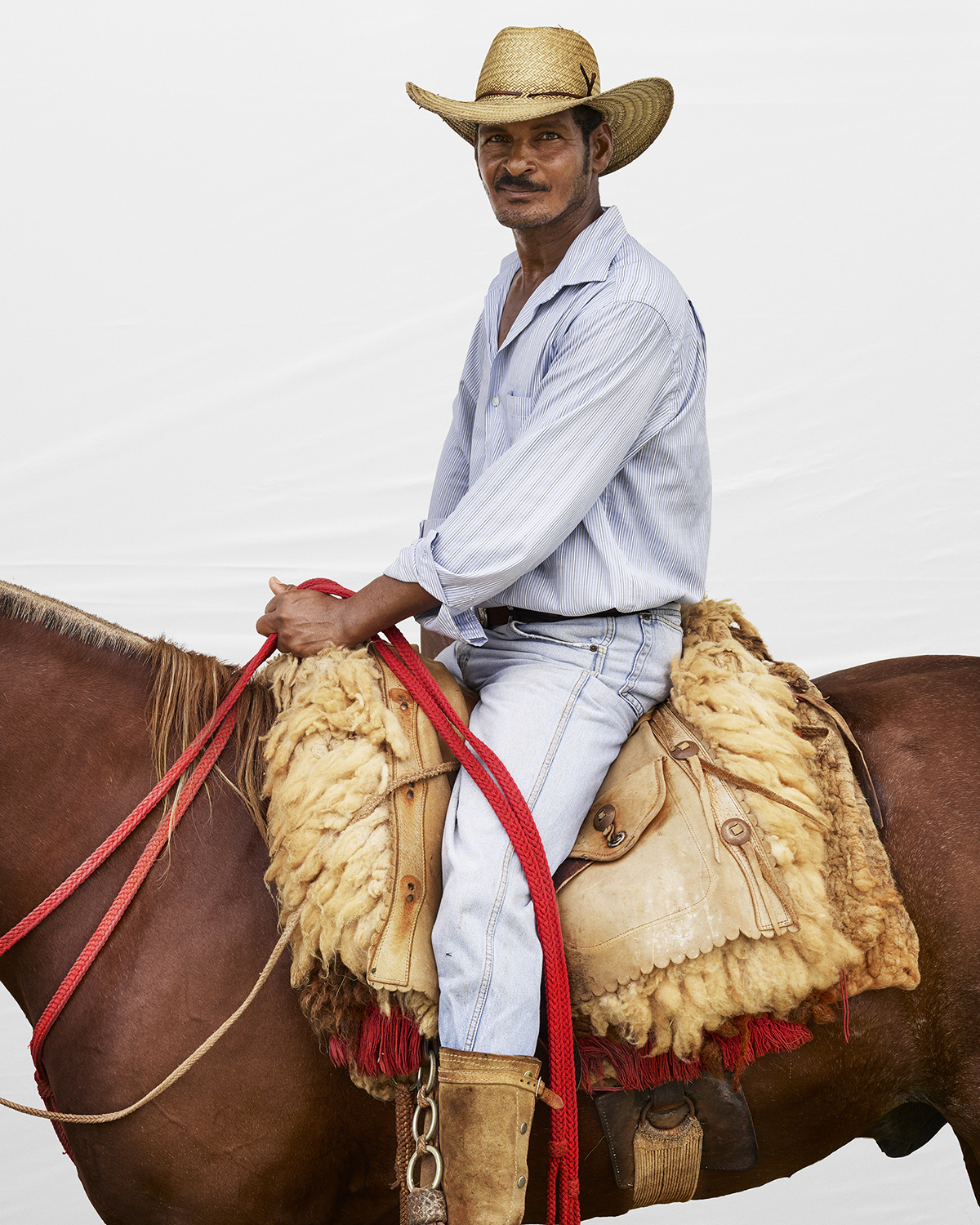
João de Souza Lopes Filho – Somos Brasil (2018)

== Publications ==
- Lyon, Marcus (2000). Tuna : London, UK: LYON.
- Lyon, Marcus (2006). Flowers : London, UK: LYON.
- Lyon, Marcus (2016). Somos Brasil – A Human Atlas of a Nation: São Paulo, Brazil: Editora Madalena & ImageMagica. ISBN 978-85-61921-06-4 Lyon, Marcus (2018). WE: deutschland – A Human Atlas : London, UK: LYON. ISBN 978-1-5272-2790-3
- Lyon, Marcus (2018). WE:deutschland – A Human Atlas: London, UK: LYON. ISBN 978-1-5272-2790-3
- Lyon, Marcus (2020). i.Detroit – A Human Atlas of an American City: London, UK: LYON. ISBN 978-1-9163668-0-0

== Exhibitions ==
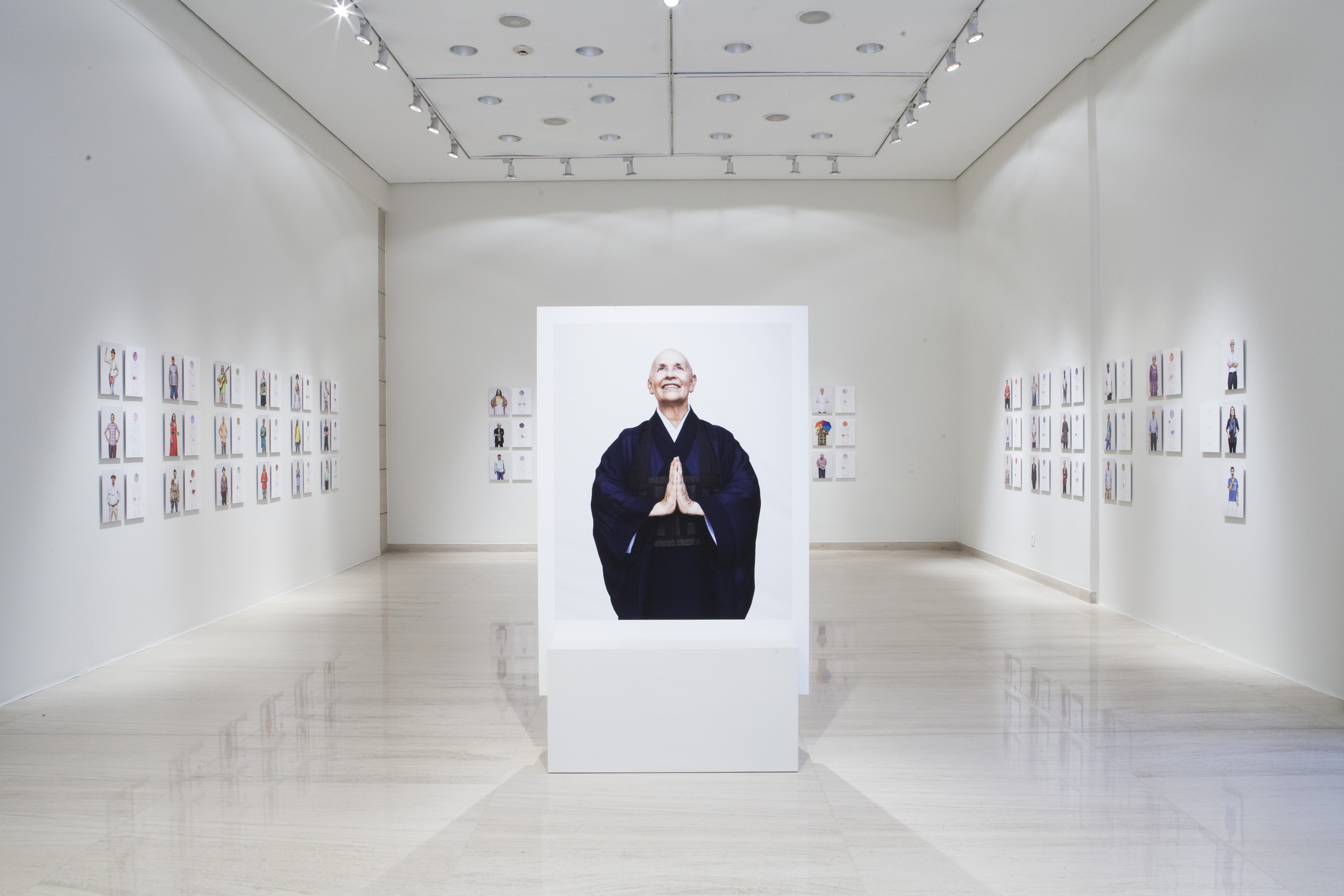
Somos Brasil Exhibition in São Paulo, Brazil, 2017

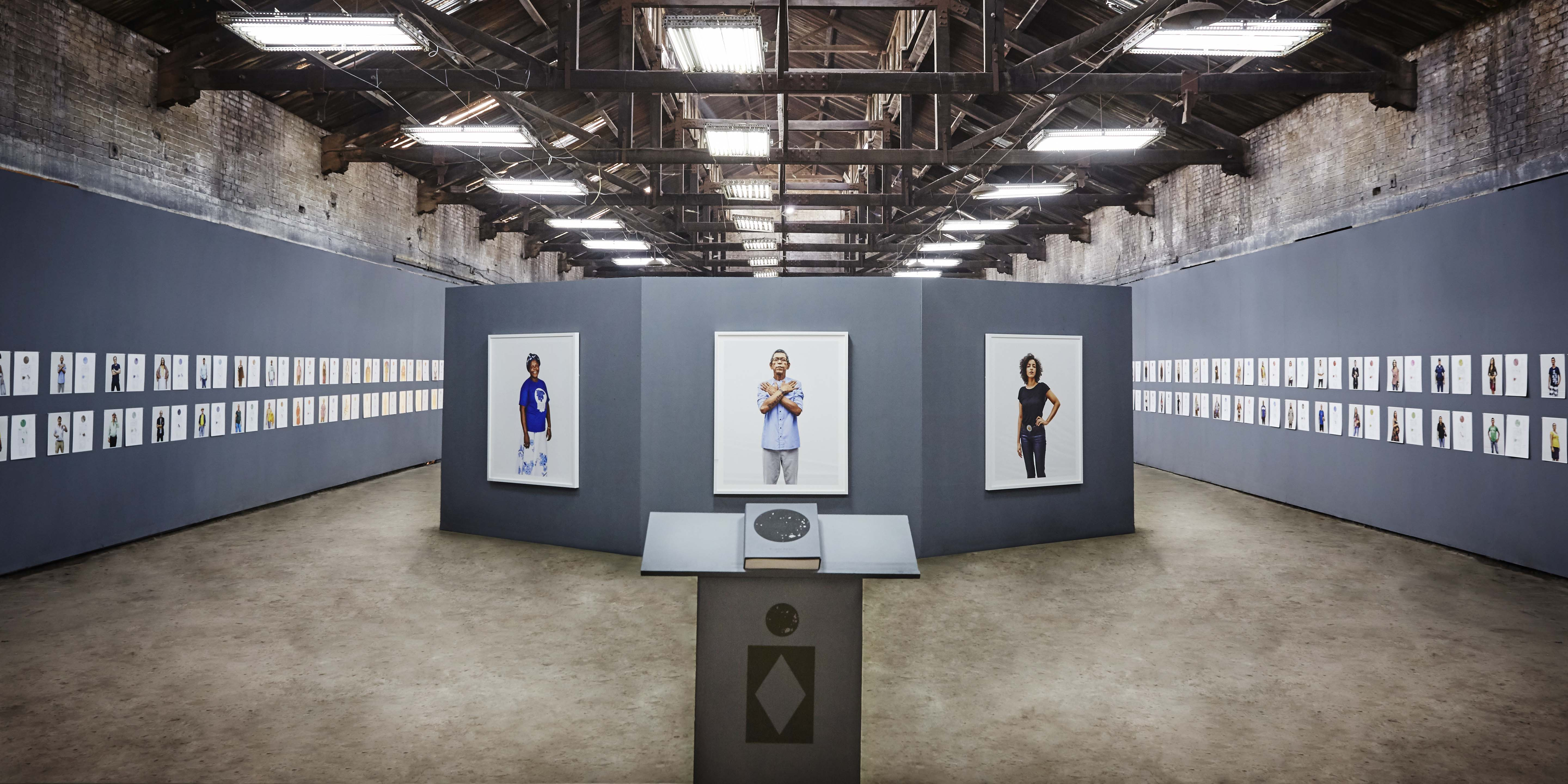
Somos Brasil Exhibition in Pingyao, China, 2017

- 2017 – Somos Brasil: CBB, São Paulo, Brazil
- 2017 – Somos Brasil: Pingyao, China
- 2018 – Somos Brasil, Royal Botanical Gardens: Sydney, Australia
- 2019 – Embassy of Brazil: London, United Kingdom

== Awards ==
- 2001 – D&AD Graphite Pencil / Editorial & Books / Book Covers for ‘Tuna’ book
- 2001 – D&AD Wood Pencil / Graphic Design / Self-Promotional Items for ‘Tuna’ book
- 2017 – D&AD Yellow Pencil / Book Design / Culture, Art & Design Books Visualisation for ‘Somos Brasil’ book
- 2017 – D&AD Graphite Pencil / Graphic Design / Integrated Graphics for ‘Somos Brasil’ book
- 2017 – D&AD Graphite Pencil / Graphic Design / Data Visualisation for ‘Somos Brasil’ book
- 2019 – British Book Awards – Best Self-published Book for ‘WE: deutschland’ book
- 2021 – Design Week Awards – Editorial Design / Social Design for ‘i.Detroit’ book
- 2021 – D&AD Wood Pencil / Graphic Design / Integrated for ‘i.Detroit’ book
