= Francis Reiss =

Australian photographer (1927–2017)

- Born: 1927; Hamburg, Germany
- Died: 4 December 2017
- Known for: Photography

Francis Reiss (1927 – 4 December 2017) was an Australian photographer, born to Danish parents in Hamburg, Germany. He was best known for his work for Picture Post and Life magazines.

== Early life ==
Reiss was born in 1927 in Hamburg, Germany to Danish parents. He began taking photos as a child. The family moved to the United Kingdom in 1936. There he attended Oundle School, and began taking photos.

== Career and death ==
Reiss began working for Picture Post magazine in the UK at the age of 17, the youngest staff photographer employed by them. Picture Post published over 60 picture stories by him. In 1947, Reiss sailed for New York and immediately started working for LIFE magazine. In 1950, realising he had gone stale, Reiss quit photography, and entered the wool trade.

Not until 1993, ten years after migrating to Australia and receiving a chance commission from James Mollison did he return to photography. Reiss died on 4 December 2017 at the age of 90.

== Collections ==
His works are held in a number of collections:

- State Library of Victoria
- National Library of Australia
- National Portrait Gallery (Australia)
- Jewish Museum of Australia
- National Gallery of Victoria
- Monash Gallery of Art
- Mitchell Library (Australia)
- Heide Museum of Modern Art
- City of Whitehorse art collection

== Exhibitions ==
His work has been exhibited at a number of galleries in Australia, including one-man shows at:

- Bendigo Art Gallery
- Monash Gallery of Art
- Whitehorse Art Space

and in group exhibitions at:

- Barbican Centre

== Publications ==
His work has appeared in the following publications:

- Journal of Mediterranean Archaeology
- Overland magazine
- Bystander magazine
