= Grace Robertson =

British photojournalist (1930–2021)

Grace Robertson OBE (13 July 1930 – 11 January 2021) was a British photographer who worked as a photojournalist, and published in Picture Post and Life. Her photographic series, including "Mother's Day Off" (1954) and "Childbirth" (1955), mainly recorded ordinary women in postwar Britain.

Robertson's work is held in the collections of the National Galleries of Scotland, Science Museum Group, Tate and Victoria and Albert Museum.

== Early life ==
Robertson was born in Manchester, England, in 1930, to the journalist and broadcaster Fyfe Robertson and his wife Elizabeth (Betty; née Muir). Both her parents were born in Scotland, and Robertson described herself as Scottish in a 2010 interview with The Scotsman. After leaving school at 16 she looked after her mother, who had rheumatoid arthritis. She became interested in photography in 1948 and, in 1949, her father gave her a Leica camera.

== Career ==
In 1951 Robertson had a photo-essay about her younger sister doing her homework published in Picture Post, where her father worked. Another early success was on Chinese artists. Some of her early submissions used the male pseudonym "Dick Muir", ( a name made up of an old boyfriends first name and her mothers maiden name) to avoid revealing she was a woman, Her first commission for Picture Post was in Snowdonia, which resulted in "Sheep Shearing in Wales" (1951). In 1952, she photographed the Bluebell Girls in Italy, and also published "Tate Gallery" (1952).

At the date she was working, most photojournalists were men, and she was often assigned more feminine stories. Working as a freelancer throughout her career, her best-known series, "Mother's Day Off", documented working-class women from Bermondsey in London, enjoying a day out in Margate, and was published in Picture Post in 1954. The middle-aged to elderly subjects are depicted dancing, drinking and on a fairground ride. She was commissioned to shoot a similar series featuring women from Clapham for Life magazine in 1956. The Scotsman describes both these sets of photographs as "perfectly composed, artifice-free examples of classic reportage". Her series "Childbirth", published in Picture Post in 1955, included photographs of a woman in labour and delivery, considered explicit at the time, and were among the earliest such images to appear in a magazine.

Around this time, Life magazine offered her a staff job in the United States, but Robertson, recently married to Thurston Hopkins famously said she "chose life over life" and remained freelance in the UK. After the failure of the Picture Post in 1957, she continued to work as a freelance photographer and photojournalist for Life and other publications, and also took advertising photographs.

After having children, she trained and worked as a primary school teacher from 1966 to 1978, while continuing to take photographs. After retiring from teaching, she started to paint during the 1980s.

In 1986, Channel 4 broadcast a documentary about Robertson, and her work was included in an exhibition at the National Museum of Photography, Film & Television in Bradford; several other exhibitions in the UK and the United States followed. In 1989, she published an autobiographical monograph, entitled Grace Robertson – Photojournalist of the 50s. In 1992, the BBC commissioned a programme from her about ninety year olds. She also gave lectures on women photographers.

Sean O'Hagan, writing in The Guardian, characterises Robertson's work as recording ordinary women in postwar Britain, and describes her as a "proto-feminist". Tirza Latimer and Harriet Riches consider her work to be "limited to a focus on women's interests."

== Awards and honours ==
Robertson was awarded an Honorary Fellowship from the Royal Photographic Society in 1995 and appointed an OBE in 1999. She received honorary degrees from the University of Brighton (1995) and Brunel University (2007).

== Personal life ==
Robertson, who stood 6 ft 2 in (188 cm) in her bare feet, married in 1955 the Picture Post photographer Thurston Hopkins. They had two children. In the 1980s, on Thurston Hopkins' retirement, the couple moved to Seaford in East Sussex, where they remained until their deaths in 2014 at the age of 101 and 2021 age 90 respectively.

Robertson died on 11 January 2021, aged 90.

== Publications ==
=== Books of work by Robertson ===
- Robertson, Grace (1989). Grace Robertson: Photojournalist of the 50s. London: Virago. ISBN 1-85381-089-4.
- Robertson, Grace (2002). Grace Robertson: A Sympathetic Eye. University of Brighton. ISBN 978-1-901177-62-6.

=== Books of work with contributions by Robertson ===
- Picture Post: Women. London: Collins & Brown, 1993. By Juliet Gardiner. ISBN 9781855851665.

== Collections ==
Robertson's work is held in the following public collections:

- National Galleries of Scotland, Scotland: 7 prints (as of January 2021)
- Science Museum Group, UK: 3 prints (as of January 2021)
- Tate, London: 7 prints (as of January 2021)
- The Aldrich Collection, University of Brighton School of Art, Brighton and Hove: 2 prints (as of January 2021)
- Victoria and Albert Museum, London: 22 prints (as of January 2021)

A portrait of Robertson by Rena Pearl is held in the collection of the National Portrait Gallery, London.
