= Stefan Lorant =

American journalist

Stefan Lorant (Hungarian: Lóránt István; February 22, 1901, in Budapest, Austria-Hungary – November 14, 1997, in Rochester, Minnesota) was a pioneering Hungarian-American filmmaker, photojournalist, and author. He was one of the developers of the picture magazine and picture book (coffee table book).

== Early work ==
Stefan Lorant was born on February 22, 1901, in Budapest, Austria-Hungary, to Izrael Reich and Hermine Guttmann, both Jews. After completing high school in his native Hungary in 1919, Lorant moved to Germany, where he made his mark in films and photojournalism. His first film, The Life of Mozart, established him as a filmmaker, and he went on to make 14 films in Vienna and Berlin, some of which he wrote, directed, and photographed. He claimed to have given Marlene Dietrich her first film test, and though he rejected her for the part, they remained lifelong friends. Lorant's abilities in writing and still photography led to the editorship of the Münchner Illustrierte Presse, one of Germany's finest picture magazines.

Opposed to Adolf Hitler, Lorant was imprisoned on 13 March 1933, six weeks after Hitler came to power. Released on 25 September 1933, he made his way to England (via Paris), where he published I Was Hitler's Prisoner, a memoir that sold out many printings. He edited the Weekly Illustrated, a popular British picture magazine, then founded Lilliput, made famous by his clever picture juxtapositions, as in Neville Chamberlain versus the llama. On 1 October 1938, Lorant co-founded with publisher Sir Edward G. Hulton the first great British picture magazine, Picture Post. During this time, Lorant published a Picture Post Special about the United States.

Failing to obtain British citizenship, Lorant moved to Lenox, Massachusetts, in the United States in July 1940, where he lived the remainder of his life. Tom Hopkinson succeeded Lorant as editor of Picture Post.

== Later work ==
During his 40-plus years in America, Lorant edited and authored many illustrated books – including The New World, the first pictures of America, and a picture biography of President Abraham Lincoln. In writing his biography of Lincoln he discovered an April 25, 1865, photo of Lincoln's Manhattan funeral procession passing the home of C.V.S. Roosevelt, and spied two young boys in an upper window. He interviewed Theodore Roosevelt's widow Edith Carow Roosevelt, who confirmed that the two boys were Theodore and his brother Elliott. She recalled that at the age of three, she had joined the two boys at the open window. When she saw “all the black drapings” she started to weep. “They didn’t like me crying. They took me and locked me in a back room.” The anecdote became part of his history of the United States Presidents entitled The Glorious Burden.

He went on to publish a history of Pittsburgh, Pennsylvania (in many editions, which the notable Life photographer W. Eugene Smith contributed to); and a history of Germany from Otto Bismarck to Hitler called Sieg Heil!

Long a friend of the talented and powerful, Lorant championed Sir Winston Churchill before and during World War II, and was a friend of the Kennedys and Marilyn Monroe. He gave advice to Life founder Henry Luce around the time of that magazine's startup in 1936, and he edited the works of many leading photographers while in Europe, including Felix Man, Kurt Hutton, Alfred Eisenstaedt, and Robert Capa. Lorant also edited the works of a notable British photojournalist for Picture Post, Bert Hardy, though Hardy's early work for that magazine was not attributed to him, even in the purchase, apparently because the agency he worked for did not allow freelancing.

More about Lorant's late life and work can be found in Michael Hallet's book Stefan Lorant: Godfather of Photojournalism.

== Marriage and family ==
I was Hitler's Prisoner describes how Lorant met and married Niura Norskaja, daughter of a once-wealthy Kiev factory owner. Their son, Andi, was three when Lorant was released.

Lorant married Laurie Jean Robertson in 1963; they divorced in 1978. They had two sons: Mark, who died at age 19 in an auto accident, and Christopher.

== Sources ==
- Thomas Willimowski, Stefan Lorant – Eine Karriere im Exil (Berlin: wvb, 2005) ISBN 978-3-86573-139-5
- Michael Hallett, Stefan Lorant – Godfather of Photojournalism (Lanham, Md.: Scarecrow Press, 2006) ISBN 978-0-8108-5682-0
- The International Center of Photography Encyclopedia of Photography (New York City: A Pound Press Book, Crown Publishers, Inc., 1984). "Lorant, Stefan," Pages 310–311.
