= Roger Bamber =

British photographer (1944–2022)

Roger Bamber (31 August 1944 – 11 September 2022) was a British photojournalist whose subjects included war, politics and music for both broadsheet and tabloid newspapers. He won both the British Press Photographer of the Year and News Photographer of the Year twice.

In 2023, a book of his work was published—Out of the Ordinary—to coincide with an exhibition at Brighton Museum & Art Gallery until 3 September 2023.

== Early life and education ==
Bamber was born in Leicester on 31 August 1944 to Vera (nee Stephenson) and Fred Bamber. He had an older sister Valerie. His mother had a job in the local textile industry and his father was a telephone operator. He grew up near the Great Central Railway line which created a lifelong interest in steam trains.

Bamber left Beaumont Leys secondary school in 1960 aged 16, without any O levels. His first camera was a Kodak Brownie. He enrolled in a graphic art class at Leicester College of Art and spent £80, his entire year's student grant, on a Nikon camera. He graduated in 1963, and joined Fleetway Publications, a local advertising agency as a junior photographer. In 1964, Leicester College of Art started its first photography course and Bamber was asked to teach on it.

== Career ==
In 1965, Bamber sought work as a photographer in London. He was offered his first Fleet Street role by the Daily Mail on his first day of job hunting, covering news as well as features for the then broadsheet newspaper. In 1967 he was honored as "commercial and industrial photographer of the year" in the British Press Awards for his work at the Mail.

In November 1969, he moved to the newly launched tabloid The Sun, and worked for the publication for the next 19 years covering hard news and softer features. He travelled the globe, recording armed conflicts, royalty, pop and rock stars.

In 1973 he won another photographer of the year award for a photograph of the immediate aftermath of the IRA bombing at the Old Bailey law courts in London.

In 1976 the Rolling Stones gave him permission to photograph their first night of rehearsals at the Festhalle, Frankfurt, during their European tour. The agreement was recorded in a handwritten note on hotel letterhead. Bamber's 1985 photograph of Freddie Mercury performing at Live Aid became an iconic image of the singer.

By 1988, Bamber had moved to work as a freelance photographer for The Observer, followed by The Guardian shortly thereafter. In 1992, he won a photographer of the year award from the Guardian.

Bamber's images were part of the successful bid made by Brighton and Hove to gain city status in 1999.

In 2009, Bamber retired from mainstream newspaper photography but continued to photograph a wide variety of subjects which interested him. He was working on the proofs of a book, Out of the Ordinary until shortly before his death.

== Personal life ==
In 1982, Bamber met Shân Lancaster, a journalist, while they were both covering the Falklands conflict for the Sun newspaper. They were married in 2004 after being together for 40 years. Bamber settled in Brighton in 1973.

Bamber died of lung cancer at the Royal Sussex County Hospital in Brighton on 11 September 2022.

== Publications ==
- Roger Bamber: Out of the Ordinary. Lewes: Unicorn, 2023. ISBN 9781911397168. With a foreword by Eamonn McCabe.

== Exhibitions ==
- Roger Bamber: Out of the Ordinary, Brighton Museum & Art Gallery, Brighton and Hove, 1 April – 3 September 2023

== Awards and recognition ==
- 1967: Daily Mail, commercial and industrial photographer of the year
- 1973: Photographer of the Year
- 1992: The Guardian, Photographer of the Year
- 2005: University of Brighton, honorary master's degree "for his distinguished photojournalism and the wealth of images of Brighton inspired by the city"
