= Picture Post =

Weekly photo journal magazine (1938–1957)

- Cover of the Picture Post vol. 8 no. 12 dated 21 September 1940
- Editor: Tom Hopkinson
- Former editors: Stefan Lorant, Max Raison
- Staff writers: MacDonald Hastings, Lorna Hay, Sydney Jacobson, J. B. Priestley, Lionel Birch, James Cameron, Fyfe Robertson, Anne Scott-James, Robert Kee, Timothy Raison and Bert Lloyd
- Categories: Current affairs; photojournalism
- Frequency: weekly
- Circulation: 1,950,000 copies a week in 1943
- Publisher: Sir Edward G Hulton
- First issue: 1938
- Final issue: 1957
- Country: United Kingdom
- Based in: London
- Language: English

Picture Post was a photojournalistic magazine published in the United Kingdom from 1938 to 1957. It is considered a pioneering example of photojournalism and was an immediate success, selling 1,000,000 copies a week after only two months. It has been called the UK's equivalent of Life magazine.

The magazine's editorial stance was liberal, anti-fascist, and populist, and from its inception, Picture Post campaigned against the persecution of Jews in Nazi Germany. In the 26 November 1938 issue, a picture story was run entitled "Back to the Middle Ages": photographs of Adolf Hitler, Joseph Goebbels and Hermann Göring were contrasted with the faces of those scientists, writers and actors they were persecuting.

== History ==
In January 1941 Picture Post published their "Plan for Britain". This included minimum wages throughout industry, full employment, child allowances, a national health service, the planned use of land and a complete overhaul of education. This document led to discussions about post-war Britain and was a populist forerunner of William Beveridge's November 1942 Report.

Sales of Picture Post increased further during World War II, and by December 1943, the magazine was selling 1,950,000 copies a week. By the end of 1949 circulation had declined to 1,422,000.

The founding editor, Stefan Lorant (who had also founded Lilliput and had even earlier pioneered the picture-story in Germany in the 1920s), had been succeeded by (Sir) Tom Hopkinson in 1940. Lorant, who was Jewish, had been imprisoned by Hitler in the early 1930s and later wrote a best-selling book, I Was Hitler's Prisoner. By 1940, he feared that he would be captured in a Nazi invasion of Britain and so fled to Massachusetts, where he wrote important illustrated US histories and biographies.

During World War II, the art editor of the magazine, Edgar Ainsworth, served as a war correspondent and accompanied the American 7th Army on its advance across Europe in 1945. He visited the Bergen-Belsen concentration camp three times after the British army liberated the complex in April 1945. Several of his sketches and drawings from the camp were published in a September 1945 article, Victim and Prisoner. Ainsworth also commissioned the artist Mervyn Peake to visit France and Germany at the end of the war and reported from Bergen-Belsen.

Hopkinson said that his photographers were thoroughbreds and that text could always be written after the event, but if his photographers did not come back with good pictures, he had nothing to work with. Years later, Hopkinson said that the greatest photos he ever received to lay out were Bert Hardy's images from the Korean War's Battle of Incheon, for which James Cameron wrote the article. The magazine's greatest photographers included Hardy, Kurt Hutton, Felix H. Man (aka Hans Baumann), Francis Reiss, Thurston Hopkins, John Chillingworth, Grace Robertson, and Leonard McCombe, who eventually joined Life magazine's staff. Staff writers included MacDonald Hastings, Lorna Hay, Sydney Jacobson, J. B. Priestley, Lionel Birch, James Cameron, Fyfe Robertson, Anne Scott-James, Robert Kee and Bert Lloyd. Many freelancer writers contributed as well, including George Bernard Shaw, Dorothy Parker, and William Saroyan.

On 17 June 1950, Leader magazine was incorporated in Picture Post. Editor Tom Hopkinson was often in conflict with (Sir) Edward G. Hulton, the owner of Picture Post. Hulton mainly supported the Conservative Party and objected to Hopkinson's socialist views. The conflict led to Hopkinson's dismissal in 1950 following the publication of Cameron's article, with pictures by Hardy, about South Korea's treatment of political prisoners in the Korean War.

By June 1952, circulation had fallen to 935,000. Sales continued to decline in the face of competition from television and a revolving door of new editors. By the time the magazine closed in July 1957, circulation was less than 600,000 copies a week.

Picture Post was digitised as The Picture Post Historical Archive, 1938–1957 and consists of the complete, fully searchable facsimile archive of the Picture Post. It was made available in 2011 to libraries and institutions.

== Hulton Press Library ==
Hulton Getty
- Industry: Publishing, media, web design
- Genre: Stock photography
- Predecessor: Hulton Press Library, Radio Times photo archive, BBC Hulton Picture Library, Hulton Picture Collection
- Founder: Sir Edward Hulton
- Products: Archive journalistic photography
- Parent: Getty Images
- Website: www.gettyimages.com

As the photographic archive of Picture Post expanded through the Second World War, it became clear that its vast collection of photographs and negatives, both published and unpublished, were becoming an important historical documentary resource. In 1945, Sir Edward Hulton commissioned Charles Gibbs-Smith of the Victoria and Albert Museum to catalogue the entire archive using a system of keywords and classifications. The Gibbs-Smith system was the world's first indexing system for pictures, and it was eventually adopted by the Victoria and Albert Museum and parts of the British Museum collections. The Hulton Press Library was officially established in 1947.

When Picture Post folded, Sir Edward Hulton sold the archive collection to the BBC in 1957. It was incorporated into the Radio Times photo archive, and the BBC expanded the collection further with the purchase of the photo archives of the Daily Express and Evening Standard newspapers. Eventually, the BBC disposed of its photo archive and the BBC Hulton Picture Library was sold on once more, this time to Brian Deutsch, in 1988. In 1996, the Hulton Picture Collection was bought by Getty Investments for £8.6 million. Getty Images now owns the rights to some 15 million photographs from the British press archives dating back to the 19th century. In 2000, Getty embarked on a large project to digitise the photo archive, and launched a dedicated website in 2001. A data migration programme began in 2003 and the Hulton Archive was transferred to the main Getty Images website; the Hulton Archive is still available today as a featured resource within the vast Getty holdings.

== Present day: Picture Stories ==
A documentary about the life and photographic legacy of Picture Post, Picture Stories, was produced by Ship of Life Films in 2021.

The documentary features archive interviews with editors Stefan Lorant and Tom Hopkinson and several Picture Post photographers, including Bert Hardy, Thurston Hopkins, John Chillingworth, Humphrey Spender and David Steen. It also includes the photographer Grace Robertson's last interview, in which she discusses her classic picture story "Mother's Day Off". Modern-day documentary photographers including David Hurn, Daniel Meadows, Anna Fox, Homer Sykes, Peter Dench and Nick Turpin discuss the photography and influence of Picture Post.

Picture Stories received positive reviews and won the Audience Award at the 2021 UK Jewish Film Festival. The Guardian gave the documentary a four-star review, describing it as "inspiring".

== Sources ==
Primary

- "Picture Post Historical Archive, 1938–1957". Gale.

Secondary

- Marcou, David J. (2009). 'All the Best', a Complete History of Picture Post Magazine (PDF). La Crosse History Unbound.
