= Kurt Hutton =

German-born photographer (1893–1960)

Kurt Hutton (born Kurt Hübschmann; 1893 in Strasbourg – 1960) was a German-born photographer who pioneered photojournalism in England.

== Life ==
Beginning his career with the Dephot agency in Germany, he migrated to England in 1934 and worked for Weekly Illustrated.

He then became one of the founding staff of the groundbreaking pictorial weekly news magazine Picture Post. One of his most famous images used there showed working-class girls enjoying themselves in Funfair, Southend, Essex (1938).

He spent the last decade of his life living in Aldeburgh where he photographed for Benjamin Britten.

Photographs he had taken of young concentration camp survivors recovering in the Lake District in 1945 were discovered in archives and had remained largely unknown having not been published in Picture Post. They were used as part of the source material during the making of The Windermere Children film drama released in 2020.
