= The Les Dawson Show =

1978 British television series

- Genre: Variety show
- Written by: Roy Barraclough; Les Dawson; Tony Hare; Terry Ravenscroft; Peter Robinson; Peter Vincent
- Starring: Les Dawson
- Country of origin: United Kingdom
- Original language: English
- No. of series: 5
- No. of episodes: 33

Production
- Producers: John Ammonds (series 1); Ernest Maxin (series 2–3); Robin Nash (series 4); Stewart Morris (series 5)
- Running time: 30 minutes 35 minutes (series 3; two episodes of series 2)
- Production company: BBC Television

Original release
- Network: BBC1
- Release: 21 January 1978 – 23 November 1989

The Les Dawson Show is a variety show that aired on BBC1 intermittently from 1978 until 1989. The show starred comedian Les Dawson, who had previously starred in the ITV sketch comedy programme Sez Les (1969–76), followed by Dawson and Friends (1977). The Les Dawson Show also featured sketch comedy, as well as stand-up comedy, guest appearances, dance numbers, and musical performances.

== Overview ==
=== Series 1–2 ===
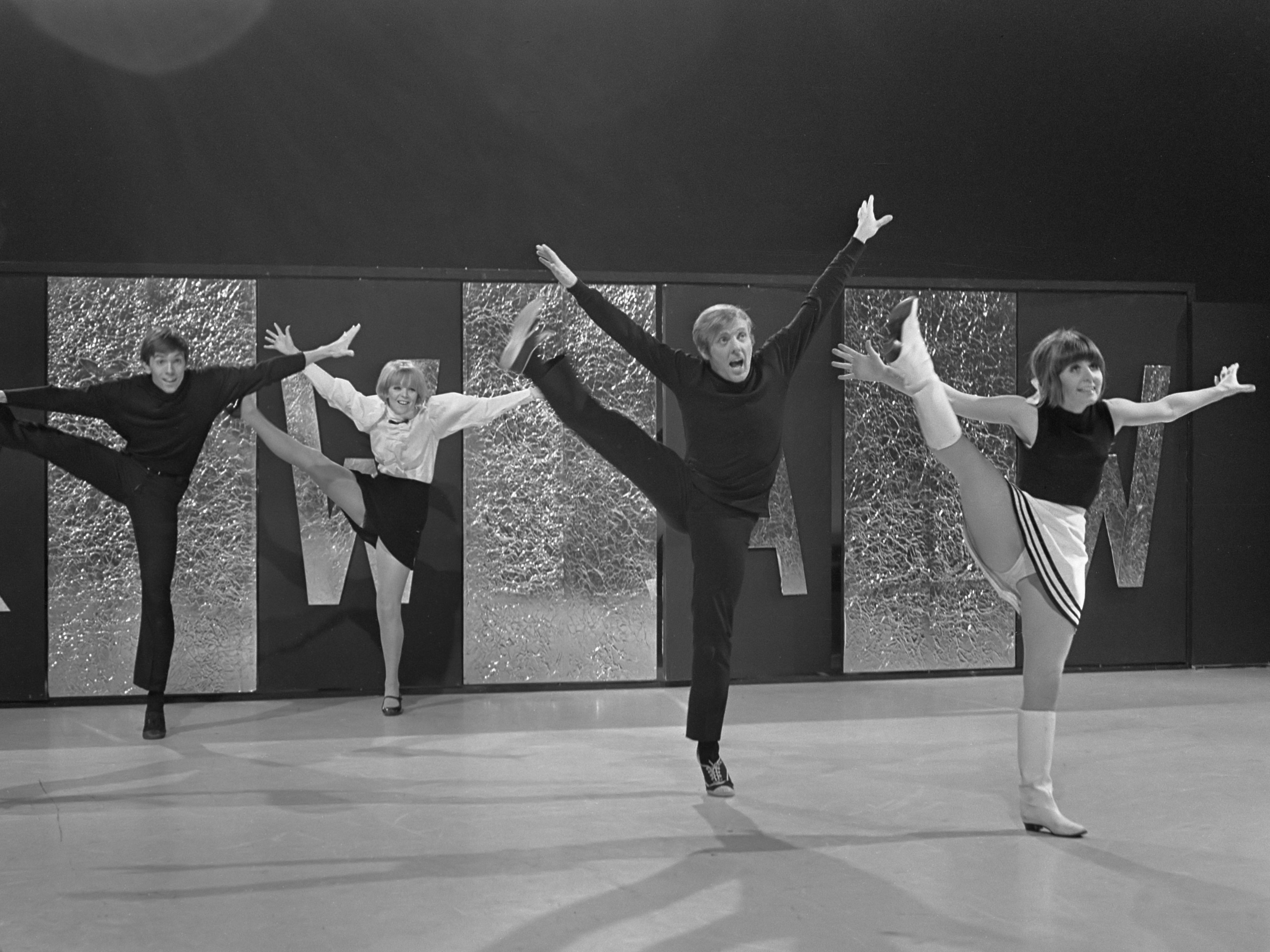
The Dougie Squires Dancers, pictured here in January 1968—ten years before their first appearance on The Les Dawson Show

In the first series, transmitted in 1978, Dawson co-hosted the show with Scottish singer-songwriter Lulu. In addition to comedy sketches and songs by Dawson, Lulu, and guests artists, each episode featured performances by the Dougie Squires Dancers, with choreography by Dougie Squires. The musical director at this time was John Coleman, and the arranger was Alan Roper. Episodes of this first series aired fortnightly rather than weekly.

No new episodes of the show aired for more than three years. Then, in May 1981, BBC1 transmitted a bank holiday special that reunited Dawson with his longtime comedy compatriot Roy Barraclough, and Sez Les writer Terry Ravenscroft. It also replaced the Dougie Squires Dancers with Kids International, a multi-ethnic singing and dancing group assembled by the show's producer, Ernest Maxin. Maxin, Barraclough, and Kids International stayed with the show through its second series—which premiered eight months later, in January 1982. For series two, Alyn Ainsworth joined-on as bandleader, and musical arrangements were handled by some new contributors to the programme, including Ivor Raymonde and Max Harris. Roy Barraclough wrote and/or performed.

Later that year, Kids International got their own 30-minute Christmas special. The Kids International Show aired on 24 December 1982; Maxin produced and directed, while Alyn Ainsworth and orchestra provided music.

=== Series 3–4 ===
For the third series, which aired in 1983, Maxin remained as producer, but Ronnie Hazlehurst became the show's musical director, and comedian Eli Woods joined the cast. Kids International, however, were becoming so popular there was a threat that they would upstage Dawson. Dawson said that he advocated for their removal until Maxin and Jim Moir (the BBC's head of variety) finally relented.

To replace of Kids International, Maxin conducted auditions to assemble a tap-dancing act named the Roly Polys. When the selection process was complete, the troupe had seven dancers: Marie Ashton, Bea Aston, Sue Cadman, Audrey Leybourne, Thea Macintyre, Ann Stephanie, and lead dancer Mo Moreland. As a matter of BBC policy, Maxin himself was obligated to retire when he turned 60 in 1983. Dawson was not happy with Maxin's replacement, Robin Nash. Nash was the former head of variety at the BBC, and had also served as head of comedy. Even so, Dawson and (show co-writer) Terry Ravenscroft found the man to lack an innate sense of comedy. Nash's tenure as the show's director and producer lasted for one series.

After BBC1 transmitted the fourth series of The Les Dawson Show in 1984, Dawson took over Terry Wogan's role as host of Blankety Blank, a comedy game show on the same channel. Meanwhile, Dawson's wife Margaret was gravely ill. She had been diagnosed with breast cancer years earlier, and finally succumbed in April 1986. After her death, Dawson swore off the "wife jokes" for which he had become known.

No new episodes of The Les Dawson Show were produced until a Christmas special in 1987. Comedy writers David Nobbs and Barry Cryer were recruited for the special, but much of the content was material rehashed from Dawson's earlier sketch comedy series, Sez Les. BBC1 repeated the special on 21 December 1988.

=== Series 5 ===
Dawson was still host of Blankety Blank when The Les Dawson Show resumed for a fifth series in 1989, and he was optimistic about the show's return. He recalls taping the series premiere at the BBC's Television Centre in London: "We had a twenty-five piece orchestra under the baton of John Coleman, John Nettles to partner me in the sketches, and, as a special guest, Shirley Bassey". Roy Barraclough was among the scriptwriters, and the show had a new director and producer: Stewart Morris. When the 1989 series aired, however, the ratings disappointed Dawson greatly. He ascribed the failure to a decision made by BBC1 to premiere the show during the broadcast run of Blankety Blank, rather than after. The final episode of The Les Dawson Show was a Christmas special that aired on 30 December 1989—five weeks after the series five finale, and a few days after the Blankety Blank Christmas special. Blankety Blank, too, was soon cancelled; the 1989–1990 series was its last until BBC1 revived the programme in 1998, with Paul O'Grady as host. Dawson died of a heart attack in 1993.

== Episodes ==
In addition to five series of six episodes, there were three Christmas specials and a bank holiday special. A comedy sketch was also featured in a 1982 Christmas special called The Funny Side of Christmas.

=== Series 1 (1978) ===
No. overall	No. in series	Directed by	Written by	Produced by	Original release date
1	1	Phil Bishop	David Renwick, Peter Robinson, Mick Loftus, Les Dawson, Eddie Braben	John Ammonds	21 January 1978
Featuring the Dougie Squires Dancers. Guest actors: Glynn Edwards and David Jason
2	2	Phil Bishop	David Renwick, Peter Robinson, Les Dawson, Eddie Braben	John Ammonds	4 February 1978
Featuring the Dougie Squires Dancers. Guest actors: Royce Mills and Daphne Riggs
3	3	Phil Bishop	David Renwick, Peter Robinson, Les Dawson, Eddie Braben	John Ammonds	18 February 1978
Featuring the Dougie Squires Dancers. Guest actors: June Jago, Maureen Lane, and Kenneth Watson
4	4	Phil Bishop	David Renwick, Peter Robinson, Tony Hare, Tom Magee-Englefield, Les Dawson, Eddie Braben	John Ammonds	4 March 1978
Featuring the Dougie Squires Dancers. Guest actor: Claire Nielson
5	5	Phil Bishop	David Renwick, Peter Robinson, Peter Vincent, Dennis Berson, Les Dawson, Carry Chambers	John Ammonds	18 March 1978
Featuring the Dougie Squires Dancers. Guest actors: Jacqueline Clarke, Vicki Michelle, and Ralph Watson
6	6	Phil Bishop	David Renwick, Peter Robinson, Mick Loftus, Les Dawson, Eddie Braben	John Ammonds	1 April 1978
Featuring the Dougie Squires Dancers. Guest actors: Raymond Mason, Claire Nielson, and Michael Stainton

=== Spring bank holiday special (1981) ===
No. overall	No. in series	Directed by	Written by	Produced by	Runtime	Original release date
7	1	Phil Bishop	Terry Ravenscroft, Peter Vincent, Peter Robinson, Tony Hare	Ernest Maxin	45 min.	25 May 1981
Featuring Kids International, Roy Barraclough, and Los Gauchos

=== Series 2 (1982) ===
No. overall	No. in series	Directed by	Written by	Produced by	Original release date
8	1	Phil Bishop	Les Dawson, Terry Ravenscroft, Peter Vincent, Peter Robinson, Tony Hare, Roy Barraclough	Ernest Maxin	30 January 1982
Featuring Kids International. Musical guests: Helen Shapiro and Rodney Friend
9	2	Phil Bishop	Les Dawson, Terry Ravenscroft, Peter Vincent, Peter Robinson, Tony Hare	Ernest Maxin	6 February 1982
Featuring Kids International. Guest: Helen Gelzer
10	3	Phil Bishop	Les Dawson, Terry Ravenscroft, Peter Vincent, Peter Robinson, Tony Hare	Ernest Maxin	13 February 1982
Featuring Kids International. Guest: Lena Zavaroni
11	4	Phil Bishop	Terry Ravenscroft, Peter Vincent, Peter Robinson, Tony Hare	Ernest Maxin	20 February 1982
Featuring Kids International and Roy Barraclough
12	5	Phil Bishop	Les Dawson, Terry Ravenscroft, Peter Vincent, Peter Robinson, Tony Hare	Ernest Maxin	27 February 1982
Featuring Kids International and Roy Barraclough. Guests: John Arnatt and Len Lowe
13	6	Phil Bishop	Les Dawson, Roy Barraclough, Terry Ravenscroft	Ernest Maxin	6 March 1982
Featuring Kids International and Roy Barraclough. Musical guest: Denise Nolan (formerly of The Nolan Sisters)

=== Series 3 (1983) ===
No. overall	No. in series	Directed by	Written by	Produced by	Original release date
14	1	Ernest Maxin	Les Dawson, Terry Ravenscroft	Ernest Maxin	15 January 1983
Featuring the Roly-Polys. Musical guest: Grace Kennedy
15	2	Ernest Maxin	Les Dawson, Terry Ravenscroft	Ernest Maxin	22 January 1983
Featuring the Roly-Polys. Guests: Karen Fell and Daphne Oxenford
16	3	Ernest Maxin	Les Dawson, Terry Ravenscroft	Ernest Maxin	29 January 1983
Featuring the Roly-Polys and Eli Woods. Musical guests: Steve 'n' Bonnie
17	4	Ernest Maxin	Les Dawson, Terry Ravenscroft	Ernest Maxin	5 February 1983
Featuring the Roly-Polys. Musical guest: Jade
18	5	Ernest Maxin	Les Dawson, Terry Ravenscroft	Ernest Maxin	12 February 1983
Featuring the Roly-Polys and Eli Woods. Musical guests: Steve 'n' Bonnie
19	6	Ernest Maxin	Les Dawson, Terry Ravenscroft	Ernest Maxin	19 February 1983
Featuring the Roly-Polys and Eli Woods. Musical guests: The Andersons

=== Series 4 (1984) ===
No. overall	No. in series	Directed by	Written by	Produced by	Original release date
20	1	Robin Nash	Les Dawson, Terry Ravenscroft	Robin Nash	21 January 1984
Featuring the Roly-Polys and Roy Barraclough, "Big Mick" Walter, and Eli Woods. Guest: Bertice Reading
21	2	Robin Nash	Les Dawson, Terry Ravenscroft	Robin Nash	28 January 1984
Featuring the Roly-Polys, Roy Barraclough, and Colin Edwynn. Guest: Karen Kay
22	3	Robin Nash	Les Dawson, Terry Ravenscroft	Robin Nash	4 February 1984
Featuring the Roly-Polys, Roy Barraclough, and Eli Woods. Guests: Bryan Pringle and Madeline Bell
23	4	Robin Nash	Les Dawson, Terry Ravenscroft	Robin Nash	11 February 1984
Featuring the Roly-Polys. Guests: Stephanie Lawrence and Diana King
24	5	Robin Nash	Les Dawson, Terry Ravenscroft	Robin Nash	18 February 1984
Featuring the Roly-Polys, Roy Barraclough, Eli Woods, "Big Mick" Walter, and Vicki Michelle. Guest: Gloria Hunniford
25	6	Robin Nash	Les Dawson, Terry Ravenscroft	Robin Nash	25 February 1984
Featuring the Roly-Polys, Roy Barraclough, and Eli Woods. Guest: Bertice Reading

=== Christmas special (1987) ===
No. overall	No. in series	Directed by	Written by	Produced by	Runtime	Original release date
26	1	John Bishop	Les Dawson, Barry Cryer, David Nobbs	John Bishop	50 minutes	28 December 1987
Featuring the Roly-Polys, Graeme Garden, Brian Godfrey, Peter Goodwright, Johnny More, Mo Moreland, Patrick Mower, Jane Marie Osborne, and Toni Palmer

=== Series 5 (1989) ===
No. overall	No. in series	Directed by	Written by	Produced by	Original release date
27	1	Stewart Morris	Les Dawson, Charlie Adams, Paul Alexander, Gavin Osbon, Andy Walker	Stewart Morris	19 October 1989
Featuring Lia Malcolm and Elio Pace. Guests: Shirley Bassey and John Nettles
28	2	Stewart Morris	Charlie Adams, Paul Alexander, Gavin Osbon, Andy Walker	Stewart Morris	26 October 1989
Featuring Lia Malcolm. Guests: Randy Crawford, Leslie Grantham, and Status Quo
29	3	Stewart Morris	Les Dawson, Charlie Adams, Paul Alexander, Gavin Osbon, Andy Walker	Stewart Morris	2 November 1989
Featuring Brenda Cochrane, Jay Jolley, and Lia Malcolm. Guests: Brian Blessed and David Essex
30	4	Stewart Morris	Les Dawson, Charlie Adams, Paul Alexander, Gavin Osbon, Andy Walker	Stewart Morris	9 November 1989
Featuring the Roly-Polys and Lia Malcolm. Guests: Elkie Brooks, Gerard Kenny, and Dennis Waterman
31	5	Stewart Morris	Les Dawson, Charlie Adams, Paul Alexander, Gavin Osbon, Andy Walker	Stewart Morris	16 November 1989
Featuring Rose-Marie and Lia Malcolm. Guests: Chas & Dave, Diamond and Layton, and Evelyn Glennie
32	6	Stewart Morris	Les Dawson, Charlie Adams, Paul Alexander, Gavin Osbon, Andy Walker	Stewart Morris	23 November 1989
Featuring Wayne Eagling and Lia Malcolm. Guests: Leo Sayer, Christopher Timothy, and the Fairer Sax.

=== Christmas special (1989) ===
No. overall	No. in series	Directed by	Written by	Produced by	Original release date
33	1	Stewart Morris	Les Dawson, Charlie Adams, Paul Alexander, and Gavin Osbon	Stewart Morris	30 December 1989
Featuring Stuart Anderson, Michael Corder, Jay Jolley, and Lia Malcolm. Guests: Michael Ball, Marti Webb, and John Williams.

== See also ==
- Sez Les (1969)
- The Funny Side of Christmas (1982)
- Cissie and Ada
