= List of The Morecambe & Wise Show (1968 TV series) episodes =

This is an episode summary of British TV comedy show The Morecambe & Wise Show, starring Morecambe and Wise. This was the first show of this title to be broadcast (although the duo's previous show, Two of a Kind, was credited as "The Morecambe & Wise Show" in the opening credits of its final two series), and ran on BBC2 and BBC1 for a total of nine series, plus eight Christmas specials, between 1968 and 1977.

== Overview ==
The episodes produced for the BBC between 1968 and 1977 by Eric Morecambe and Ernie Wise are generally considered to be their best output; From series two, all were written by Eddie Braben (save for the 1972 and 1976 Christmas shows which were penned by John Junkin and Barry Cryer) these programmes used a familiar format of opening spot with the duo in front of an empty stage, followed by a musical guest, sketches, another musical guest followed by a scene in the fictional flat, either in bed or in the lounge greeting star guests, usually a play "What Ern Wrote" and the closing song and credits. This format was occasionally not used but was considered the "norm" during the pair's BBC years. Until 1973, unlike other shows episodes were broadcast every fortnight rather than weekly.

From 2 September 1968 until 19 September 1971, The Morecambe and Wise Show aired on BBC 2 (except for their Christmas shows which aired on BBC 1). The main reason for this was that Morecambe and Wise had moved to the BBC because they were making colour television programmes, and Lew Grade, their boss at ATV, could not transmit their show in colour on ITV, so they moved to BBC 2, the only channel that transmitted in colour at the time. BBC 1 would join ITV in launching a full colour service in November 1969, but it took until 19 September 1971 for The Morecambe and Wise Show to be transferred to BBC 1.

The Morecambe and Wise Show is comparatively rare amongst contemporaries in that it is one of the few BBC series (along with Doctor Who and Dad's Army) to have all of its 1970s episodes exist as masters or telerecordings, while other series such as Z-Cars and Dixon of Dock Green are missing episodes from as late as 1975.

Series	Episodes	Originally released	
Series	Episodes	First released	Last released
1	8	2 September 1968	21 October 1968
2	4	27 July 1969	7 September 1969
Special		25 December 1969	
3	7	14 January 1970	22 April 1970
4	6	1 July 1970	8 October 1970
Special		25 December 1970	
5	7	8 April 1971	15 July 1971
6	6	19 September 1971	31 October 1971
Special		25 December 1971	
Special		25 December 1972	
7	12	7 January 1973	23 March 1973
Special		25 December 1973	
8	6	27 September 1974	1 November 1974
Special		25 December 1974	
Special		25 December 1975	
9	6	7 January 1976	19 April 1976
Special		25 December 1976	
Special		25 December 1977	

== Series One (September–October 1968) ==
Only BBC series written by Hills and Green. All episodes 30 minutes. 2 episodes survive in colour, 1 incomplete in colour, 1 incomplete in black & white, 3 episodes missing, and 1 has been restored. (Note: As part of the BBC's policy to wipe and re-use videotape during this era, most of the programme content was lost. However, an edited version of episode 6 was recovered in 2007. This version was a 16mm black and white telerecording, which was subsequently released on DVD alongside the complete second series in 2007. This episode underwent the colour recovery process and was subsequently released on the Morecambe & Wise - The Lost Tapes DVD in 2022. The audio versions of the entire first series still survive, as they were recorded by a fan. Additionally, in 2012, a 16mm telerecording of episode 2 was discovered in Nigeria. Although it was in an exceptionally decayed condition, it has since undergone an experimental restoration process at the BBC archive. Episodes 5 and 7 were found in 2018 in a derelict cinema in Sierra Leone.)

No. overall	No. in series	Guests	Directed by	Written by	Original release date	Viewers (millions)
1	1	Georgia Brown, Los Zafiros	John Ammonds	Dick Hills & Sid Green	2 September 1968	N/A
Missing - the audio survives through an off-air recording of its Australian broadcast.
2	2	Acker Bilk, Roy Budd	John Ammonds	Dick Hills & Sid Green	9 September 1968	N/A
A heavily damaged copy was discovered in 2012, and subsequently restored and released in 2022.
3	3	Trio Athenee, Paper Dolls	John Ammonds	Dick Hills & Sid Green	16 September 1968	N/A
An edited version of this episode was returned to the BBC Archive in 2026. Approximately 4.32 minutes are missing from this print - the boxing sketch. A complete copy of the audio survives through an off-air recording.
4	4	Bruce Forsyth, Kenny Ball & His Jazzmen	John Ammonds	Dick Hills & Sid Green	23 September 1968	N/A
The first 90 seconds of the show were recovered from an off-air recording. The rest is missing - the audio survives through an off-air recording of its Australian broadcast.
5	5	Ronnie Carroll, Kenny Ball & His Jazzmen	John Ammonds	Dick Hills & Sid Green	30 September 1968	N/A
Recovered in 2018 and screened on 28 December 2018 for the first time in 50 years, with an introduction by Michael Aspel.
6	6	Edmund Hockridge, Kenny Ball & His Jazzmen	John Ammonds	Dick Hills & Sid Green	7 October 1968	N/A
An edited version of this episode was returned to the BBC Archive in 2007. Approximately 5 minutes are missing from this print. A complete copy of the audio survives through an off-air recording of its Australian broadcast.
7	7	Michael Aspel, Chris Langford, Kenny Ball & His Jazzmen	John Ammonds	Dick Hills & Sid Green	14 October 1968	N/A
Recovered in 2018 and screened on 28 December 2018 for the first time in 50 years, with an introduction by Michael Aspel.
8	8	Matt Monro, Kenny Ball & His Jazzmen	John Ammonds	Dick Hills & Sid Green	21 October 1968	N/A
Missing - the audio survives through an off-air recording of its Australian broadcast.

== Series Two (July–September 1969) ==
First series written by Eddie Braben. All episodes survive in colour. Episodes increased to 45 minutes. First appearance of Janet Webb as "the lady who comes down at the end". This series began the tradition of Morecambe and Wise singing at the end of the show, with Bring Me Sunshine used at the end of each episode for this series.

No. overall	No. in series	Guests	Directed by	Written by	Original release date	Viewers (millions)
9	1	Janet Webb, Peter Cushing, Bobbie Gentry, Vince Hill, Kenny Ball & His Jazzmen, Ann Hamilton	John Ammonds	Eddie Braben, additional material by Mike Craig and Lawrie Kinsley	27 July 1969	N/A
The opening spot centres around the duo changing their names to Robin Catbush and Phyliss Ludicrous, followed by a table tennis quickie where the balls get larger with each serve; Wise visit from lady doctor is followed by the pair appearing as tortoises after hibernation, a silent monks skit and Frankie Vaughan singing; Peter Cushing is then introduced for his role as King Arthur in the very first Ernie Wise Knights Of The Round Table which sees the start of a long running gag that Cushing was never paid which would be used until 1980.
10	2	Janet Webb, Trio Athenee, Malcolm Roberts, Kenny Ball & His Jazzmen, Ann Hamilton, Gilly Fraser	John Ammonds	Eddie Braben, additional material by Mike Craig and Lawrie Kinsley	10 August 1969	N/A
The opening spot sees a discussion of Ernie's unseen facet, followed by a monks quickie ice cream sketch; Eric eating crisps in bed is followed by a short about leaving the cinema then Richard Wagner at work, Edward Elgar at work and Eric's bird watching, Ernie Wise's interpretation of the Complete Works of Shakespeare, closing with Eric celebrating the anniversary of D-Day
11	3	Juliet Mills, Moira Anderson, the Pattersons, Kenny Ball & His Jazzmen, Janet Webb, Ann Hamilton	John Ammonds	Eddie Braben	24 August 1969	N/A
The opening spot is themed around palm reading, followed by a silent skit of the monks cutting wood, a flat sketch sees Ernie getting an au pair much to Eric's annoyance; a Marlene Dietrich tribute is followed by Rosie Morecambe and Fanny Wise then a further Dietrich spoof and a Frankie Vaughan spoof. Juliet Mills is introduced before taking her place in Ern's play The Tea Planters' Wife.
12	4	Edward Woodward, Peter Cushing, Kenneth McKellar, The Pattersons, Kenny Ball & His Jazzmen, Janet Webb, Ann Hamilton	John Ammonds	Eddie Braben, additional material by Mike Craig and Lawrie Kinsley	7 September 1969	N/A
The opening spot sees Eric teasing his partner with a lucky talisman; a visual skit sees the monks at the organ followed by a flat sketch and the monks playing hoopla; in a cameo, Peter Cushing returns to be paid; a visual skit sees Danny La Rue "unfrocked", then the monks down with drink before Edward Woodward is introduced for his role in the play Murder At The Grange.

== The Morecambe & Wise Christmas Show (1969) ==
First Christmas special. 60 minutes duration.

No.	Guests	Directed by	Written by	Original release date	Viewers (millions)
13	Frankie Vaughan, Nina, The Pattersons, Fenella Fielding, Sacha Distel, Alan Curtis, Diane Keen	John Ammonds	Eddie Braben	25 December 1969	N/A
This was the first of the highly successful festive editions made by the BBC and is available in its entirety in the archives. This edition is less frequently repeated than the later shows, a fact that has been attributed to its lack of "big" guest stars. Although all the guests were high profile at the time, they have since become less prominent in the public eye. It features an appearance by Frankie Vaughan who had initially been the butt of many jokes for the duo, although his dislike of this led them to redirect their comments to Des O'Connor after this point. Nina van Pallandt performed Do You Know How Christmas Trees Are Grown? which had featured in that year's James Bond film On Her Majesty's Secret Service. Sacha Distel performed Raindrops Keep Fallin' On My Head a cover of the version which had featured in another newly released film Butch Cassidy and the Sundance Kid.

== Series Three (January–April 1970) ==
Episode six specially produced as BBC entry for Golden Rose Of Montreux and is 30 minutes; all other episodes 45 minutes. The song Morecambe and Wise sing at the end of the first four episodes is "Just Around the Corner", with "Bring Me Sunshine" from episode 5. All episodes extant.

No. overall	No. in series	Guests	Directed by	Written by	Original release date	Viewers (millions)
14	1	Herman's Hermits, The Pattersons, Kenny Ball & His Jazzmen, Ann Hamilton, Robert Webber, Janet Webb, Jenny Lee-Wright	John Ammonds	Eddie Braben	14 January 1970	N/A
The opening spot sees Ernie trying his hand at being a "baggy pants comic"; this is followed by a ticket clipper skit and the pair in bed discussing the secret of long life; a monks skit sees them smoking followed by The World’s Strongest Man spoof and a lost voice quickie; Eric then visits Wise's record shop. Then a flat sketch where Ernie announces he is getting married.
15	2	Edward Chapman, Clodagh Rodgers, The Pattersons, Kenny Ball & His Jazzmen, Ann Hamilton, Janet Webb	John Ammonds	Eddie Braben	28 January 1970	N/A
Eric and Ernie discuss permissive show in opening spot, Edward Chapman guests in Ernie's play "Trouble at Mill". Quickie "A Shot in the Dark". Whistling sketch featuring Eddie Braben. Monks shoplifting quickie. Flat sketch about dating Princess Anne.
16	3	Fenella Fielding, Sacha Distel, The Pattersons, Kenny Ball & His Jazzmen, Ann Hamilton, Janet Webb, Alan Curtis, Rex Rashley, Diane Keen	John Ammonds	Eddie Braben	11 February 1970	N/A
Ernie gets "with it" in the opening spot, followed by a playing in the park skit; bath time for Ernie is followed by a window-cleaning sketch; a short entitled see you at seven precedes the pair visiting Fenella Fielding to discuss the latest play; the monks feed the birds before a bowls skit and the closing play Nelson & Lady Hamilton. (This is the 1969 Christmas show re-edited with some new material.)
17	4	Diane Cilento, Vince Hill, The Pattersons, Kenny Ball & His Jazzmen, Ann Hamilton, Deryck Guyler, Frank Thornton, Janet Webb	Ernest Maxin	Eddie Braben	11 March 1970	N/A
Eric’s wig is the subject of much mirth in the opening spot, before meeting Diane Cilento for dinner; a cinema short follows, then soaking feet skit, an introduction to the play The Barretts Of Wimpole Street (which would be reused with Joanna Lumley in 1982) closes the show.
18	5	Edward Chapman, Clodagh Rodgers, The Pattersons, Kenny Ball & His Jazzmen, Ann Hamilton, Janet Webb, Alan Curtis, Eddie Braben, Leslie Murphy	John Ammonds	Eddie Braben	25 March 1970	N/A
Ernie’s award opening spot, Ernie leaves the flat, whisper passing the joke, Street corner buskers, Monks watching the epilogue, Ian Carmichael introduction and play "Frankenstein’s Monster".
19	6	Nina	John Ammonds	Eddie Braben, additional material by Dick Hills and Sid Green (the Trousers sketch) & Mike Craig and Lawrie Kinsley (the Nina sketch)	8 April 1970	N/A
This episode was entered for the Golden Rose Of Montreaux. The opening spot see the duo attempting to exchange trousers, then Nina performs the Banana Boat Song with some backing and percussion from the duo; a powerful binoculars skit is followed by Eric's enormous ventriloquist doll "Oggy" closing the show with Bring Me Sunshine.
20	7	Richard Greene, Nana Mouskouri & The Athenians, The Pattersons, Kenny Ball & His Jazzmen, Ann Hamilton, Rex Rashley, Janet Webb	John Ammonds	Eddie Braben	22 April 1970	N/A
The opening spot sees Ernie attempting to become an overgrown boy scout; The Nose Blowers follows a sketch with Richard Greene; three shorts follow: "Love In A Mist", "Pocket Radio" and the monks dancing before Richard Greene is introduced for his appearance in The Adventures Of Robin Hood

== Series Four (July–October 1970) ==
Second series produced in 1970. All episodes 50 minutes. All episodes extant.

No. overall	No. in series	Guests	Directed by	Written by	Original release date	Viewers (millions)
21	1	Janet Webb, Kenny Ball & His Jazzmen, Eric Porter, Jan Daley, Trio Athenee, Michael Ward	John Ammonds	Eddie Braben	1 July 1970	N/A
A This Is Your Life segment forms the opening spot followed by a Moon landing skit; Voice swap skit, then the duo visit Eric Porter in his dressing room before Tarzan’s Last Adventure; a six weeks to live skit, a bill-posting quickie, the glove puppet sketch and the monks in a James Bond spoof precede the play Wuthering Heights.
22	2	Janet Webb, Kenny Ball & His Jazzmen, George A. Cooper, Kenneth McKellar, Samantha Jones, Margery Mason, Ann Hamilton, Jenny Lee-Wright, Rex Rashley	John Ammonds	Eddie Braben	15 July 1970	N/A
Opening spot about Eric fox hunting, a record shop sketch involving bird calls, then a visit to Eric’s parents, three in a bed, boarding house, in the park with baby, the speaking clock, a barbers' shop quickie, "Frankie Vaughan’s Son", the monks following sign posts, and a flat sketch where a pregnant lady calls for Ernie
23	3	Nina, Craig Douglas, Kenny Ball & His Jazzmen, Ann Hamilton, Jenny Lee-Wright, Thelma Bignell, Lillian Padmore, Melita Clarke, Penny Beeching, Janet Webb	John Ammonds	Eddie Braben	29 July 1970	N/A
Eric’s obsession with health food forms the opening spot, a quickie on contagious disease, the underwear shop, Miss Holiday Resort, Nina gives Eric a cake, the monks on pay day, and the final sketch sees Wise trying to pen a play in bed only to be constantly disrupted by Morecambe.
24	4	Fenella Fielding, Ray Stevens, Sylvia McNeill, Kenny Ball & His Jazzmen, Ann Hamilton, Janet Webb, Frank Tregar, Leslie Noyes	John Ammonds	Eddie Braben	12 August 1970	N/A
Ernie’s ballet accident is the focus of the opening spot, then a christening sketch followed by Fenella Fielding visiting the flat, getting directions from a policeman, the big record, the monks playing dice games, Sing Something Simple and I’ll See You Again closes the show.
25	5	Barbara Murray, Dusty Springfield, Sir Michael Redgrave, Dame Flora Robson, Sir Felix Aylmer, Robin Day, Kenny Ball & His Jazzmen, Bruce & Peter Davis, Ann Hamilton, Alan Curtis, Janet Webb, Penelope Beeching	John Ammonds	Eddie Braben	26 August 1970	N/A
The opening spot centred around a stool, a dieting sketch, Eric messing up Ernie’s plays and insulting the guest stars, a ticket collector skit, the drama critic, the monks at the organ precede Barbara Murray's introduction before the play There’s No Business Like Big Business.
26	6	Janet Webb, Kenny Ball & His Jazzmen, Paul Anka, Patricia Lambert	John Ammonds	Eddie Braben	8 October 1970	N/A
Featuring a selection of sketches including moustache seeds, Ernie in hospital, the ear specialist, a honeymooning couple next door and closing song. The programme was screened some three months after the first five episodes of the series, as a new production to introduce a run of repeats. This episode aired on BBC 1 instead of their usual channel BBC 2. This was to give BBC 1 viewers a chance to see some of the sketches and routines the duo had been making over on BBC 2, as some people at this time could not receive BBC 2. It would be followed by a repeat season of episodes originally aired on BBC 2. The episode was missing until a copy was discovered by Gary Morecambe among his father's papers in 2020, with sketches from the programme shown in black & white as part of the Morecambe and Wise episode of the ITV documentary series The Lost Tapes in July 2021, and the fully restored episode broadcast by the BBC at Christmas 2021.

== The Morecambe & Wise Christmas Show (1970) ==
No.	Guests	Directed by	Written by	Original release date	Viewers (millions)
27	Peter Cushing, William Franklyn, Nina van Pallandt, Eric Porter, Edward Woodward, Kenny Ball & His Jazzmen, Ann Hamilton, Alan Curtis, Rex Rashley, George Day, John Higgins, Clinton Morris, Janet Webb	John Ammonds	Eddie Braben	25 December 1970	N/A
The second seasonal offering saw the return of recurring guest star Peter Cushing who still hadn't been paid (a joke that was to continue well into their Thames Television days); also starring was William Franklyn who, at the time, fronted an advertising campaign for Schweppes tonic water with his "Shhh, You Know Who..." tagline. Much comedy was drawn from this as the BBC was forbidden to advertise products. He appears in one of the duo's plays at the end of the show, which parodies The Three Musketeers. Actor Edward Woodward also sang The Way You Look Tonight rather than appearing within a sketch as he had done in previous appearances. Also features the collapsing Christmas tree gag with Nina.

== Series Five (April–July 1971) ==
First series in 1971. All episodes 45 minutes. This was the last series to premiere on BBC 2, with the show moving to BBC 1 from Series Six.

No. overall	No. in series	Guests	Directed by	Written by	Original release date	Viewers (millions)
28	1	Dame Flora Robson, Esther Ofarim, Kenny Ball & His Jazzmen, Peter & Alex, Ann Hamilton, Alan Curtis, David March, Janet Webb	John Ammonds	Eddie Braben	8 April 1971	N/A
The opening spot is followed by learning to play the piano in sixty seconds, an employment office skit, changing shoes, trying to impress Flora Robson, before the play Queen Elizabeth The First Of England, Part One, a draughts sketch and the talking doll.
29	2	Arthur Lowe, Susan Maughan, Robert Young, Kenny Ball & His Jazzmen, Ann Hamilton, Frank Tregar, Rex Rashley, Janet Webb, Dad's Army Cast	John Ammonds	Eddie Braben	22 April 1971	N/A
After the opening spot is the Facts Of Life sketch, Ernie Wise tries to sing, Arthur Lowe meets the lady who comes down at the end and marries her, the play Monty On The Bonty followed by the closing theme song.
30	3	Frank Ifield, The Settlers, Kenny Ball & His Jazzmen, Richard Caldicot, Michael Ward, Gordon Clyde, Ann Hamilton, Grazina Frame, Brychan Powell, Janet Webb	John Ammonds	Eddie Braben	6 May 1971	N/A
Ernie considers replacing Eric in the opening spot, followed by silent monks, The Connoisseurs discuss antiques, a milk quickie, dreaming of falling, Eric's "Coming-&-Going" illness, the jewellery shop, the boarding ramp, and a flat sketch with a fellow writer (which would be reused for Thames later) preceding the closing song.
31	4	Jack Jones, Sheila Southern, Kenny Ball & His Jazzmen, Ann Hamilton, Gordon Clyde, Rex Rashley, Grazina Frame, Frank Tregar, Janet Webb, Stanley Mason	John Ammonds	Eddie Braben	20 May 1971	N/A
Ernie's body is the subject of ridicule in the opening spot, Jack Jones performs Get Together, the record shop, love letters, Hotel Dracula, Arthur swallows the harmonica, the invisible Eric quickie, and Ernie has the flu in the closing flat sketch
32	5	Glenda Jackson, Mary Hopkin, Ronnie Hilton, Ann Hamilton, Janet Webb	John Ammonds	Eddie Braben	3 June 1971	N/A
Ernie considering retirement is discussed in the opening spot, the vicars on a train sketch, "no lettuce" quickie, Glenda Jackson at the flat, felling a safe quickie and the Ernie Wise play Antony & Cleopatra closes the show; this play was much repeated in compilation shows over the years and is often regarded as some of the duo's best work.
33	6	Ian Carmichael, Matt Monro, Kiki Dee, Peter & Alex, Ann Hamilton, Charles Rayford, Melanie Fraser, Janet Webb	John Ammonds	Eddie Braben	17 June 1971	N/A
Ernie’s education is up for discussion in the opening spot, then a Sherlock Holmes quickie, a visit to the wig boutique, Eric feeling fed up and listless, a police visit, Hands Across The Table quickie, Eric does Jake The Peg and Ian Carmichael is introduced for the play Murder In Mayfair
34	7	Trio Athenee, Design, Kenny Ball & His Jazzmen, Ann Hamilton, Rex Rashley, Gerald Case Janet Webb	John Ammonds	Eddie Braben	15 July 1971	N/A
Reading newspaper reviews forms the basis for the opening spot, an exploding piano quickie, the Multilingual Hotel, preaching in the pulpit, a fishing quickie, Eric has the reversals, and Ernie aspires to become Bob Hope's scriptwriter with hilarious results. This was the last episode to premiere on BBC 2.

== Series Six (September–October 1971) ==
Second series produced in 1971. Last regular appearance of Janet Webb. This was the first series to be aired on BBC 1.

No. overall	No. in series	Guests	Directed by	Written by	Original release date	Viewers (millions)
35	1	Kenny Ball & His Jazzmen, Francis Matthews, Anita Harris, Robert Young, Ann Hamilton, A. J. Brown, Bert Palmer, Ann Way	John Ammonds	Eddie Braben	19 September 1971	N/A
Eric has a new tape recorder in the opening spot, then musical leg pulling, the book shop: The Language Of Birds before Francis Matthews is introduced before the Ernie Wise play The House Of Terror. This would be the first edition of their show to air on BBC 1, as for the previous five series the show had aired on BBC 2 (with a repeat some weeks or months later on BBC 1 for the benefit of those viewers who retained 405-line TV sets and were thus unable to receive BBC 2.
36	2	Keith Michell, Design, Angie Grant	John Ammonds	Eddie Braben	26 September 1971	N/A
Doom and disaster reign in the opening spot, a submarine skit, whistling sketch, Bobo The Glove Puppet, an accident at work sketch, then Keith Michell is introduced for The Legion Of The Lost play to close.
37	3	Kenny Ball & His Jazzmen, Cilla Black, Ronnie Carroll, Percy Thrower	John Ammonds	Eddie Braben	3 October 1971	N/A
Eric has got his hands on a Jasper Rawlings painting in the opening spot, Ten Years Hence... sees the duo imagining 1981 (an idea later revisited at Thames), introducing Cilla with the promise of a record contract while the three sing Bring Me Sunshine precedes Gardeners World with Percy Thrower who visits the duo as Eric takes over as his gardening apprentice.
38	4	Kenny Ball & His Jazzmen, John Mills, Mrs Mills, Trio Athenee, Arnold Diamond, Tony Melody	John Ammonds	Eddie Braben	10 October 1971	N/A
Eric has had a threatening letter from a hit man in the opening spot, then a Top Of The Form spoof, Mrs. Mills' introduction sees her presented with a fruitcake, John Mills and the autographed banana precedes the play Escape From Stalag 54
39	5	Nina, The Pattersons, Ann Hamilton, Frank Tregar, John Scott Martin, Christine Shaw, Jennifer Watts	John Ammonds	Eddie Braben	17 October 1971	N/A
Piano quickie. Ernie is to be induced as one of the Great Men Of Our Time in the opening spot, the car accessory shop, the Brian Rix Trousers Down Competition, Eric's leg rejuvenating machine, a milkman quickie, Nina is presented with a gold disc and a flat sketch reading the Sunday papers and playing spot the ball
40	6	Tom Jones, Design	John Ammonds	Eddie Braben	31 October 1971	N/A
The duos' family trees come under discussion in the opening spot, a cement bucket skit, Ernie's wife has a fancy man, Eric's dog, the dentist sketch, the Harpenden Male Voice Choir, Tom Jones gets new backing singers for Exactly Like You, at the flat Ernie is trying to work on his memoirs to be interrupted by Eric.

== The Morecambe & Wise Christmas Show (1971) ==
No.	Guests	Directed by	Written by	Original release date	Viewers (millions)
41	Shirley Bassey, Glenda Jackson, André Previn, Frank Bough, Robert Dougall, Cliff Michelmore, Patrick Moore, Michael Parkinson, Eddie Waring, Los Zafiros, Dick Emery, Francis Matthews, Ann Hamilton	John Ammonds	Eddie Braben	25 December 1971	N/A
The festive edition for 1971 features Shirley Bassey singing "Smoke Gets in Your Eyes" whilst the duo rearrange the scenery, (she also performed the theme song from that year's Bond film Diamonds Are Forever), the Hollywood Melody with Glenda Jackson and the BBC newsreaders and André Previn (aka Andrew Preview) conducting Eric's rendition of Grieg's Piano Concerto (by Grieg). Another of the BBC's comedy stars, Dick Emery, also makes a brief cameo appearance in the opening spot of the show. This episode is frequently repeated each December and excerpts regularly used as part of compilation shows.

== The Morecambe & Wise Christmas Show (1972) ==
Only episode produced in 1972. First episode since 1968 not written by Eddie Braben.

No.	Guests	Directed by	Written by	Original release date	Viewers (millions)
42	Glenda Jackson, Jack Jones, Vera Lynn, Pete Murray, Kenny Ball	John Ammonds	Barry Cryer & John Junkin, Mike Craig & Lawrie Kinsley (reindeer sketch), Eric Morecambe & Ernie Wise (additional material)	25 December 1972	N/A
No series was produced in 1972 with the duo concentrating on a high-quality spectacular for Christmas Night. Braben had suffered a breakdown and was not credited as working on the special, instead it was written by John Junkin and Barry Cryer. Several guests from previous shows returned, as well as Vera Lynn singing "Pass Me By" with Eric and Ernie as backing, and Kenny Ball joining in with the Cabaret finale to the Victoria & Albert play with Glenda Jackson. Pete Murray appeared in the play "What Ern Wrote" entitled "Dawn Patrol", a World War One flying aces spoof. The show also featured cameos from various stars who had previously appeared, in pre-filmed inserts where they stated "I worked with Morecambe and Wise, and look what happened to me..." as the camera pulled back to show them in a variety of other jobs; they were: Ian Carmichael (news vendor), Fenella Fielding (railway guard), Eric Porter (binman), Dame Flora Robson (tea lady), André Previn (bus conductor), and former "lady who comes down at the end" Janet Webb.

== Series Seven (January–March 1973) ==
Longest series produced by Morecambe & Wise since 1967 (Two of a Kind, Series 6). Only series produced in 1973.

No. overall	No. in series	Guests	Directed by	Written by	Original release date	Viewers (millions)
43	1	Cliff Richard, Vikki Carr	John Ammonds	Eddie Braben	5 January 1973	N/A
At the opening, pop star Cliff Richard visits the pair's fictional flat, interrupting Eric's painting of his model Spitfire; whilst Ernie tries valiantly to be "hip" and "with it" sporting a purple-flared trouser suit and red kaftan, the scene concludes with the three appearing as sailors for a routines based on The Fleet's In Town ending with Morecambe stepping off the ship with a Play School parody mid-way through.
44	2	Robert Morley, Vicky Leandros, New World, Ann Hamilton, Reg Lye, Janet Webb	John Ammonds	Eddie Braben	12 January 1973	N/A
Robert Morley appears in The Curse Of Tutankhamen in which it is discovered that the mighty king took some unusual items to his grave including a fan belt and a packet of salt and vinegar crisps. It is also revealed that he had a sister (Tutantesi, a parody on Two-Ton Tessie) who is revealed to still be alive and played by Janet Webb, otherwise known as "the lady who comes down at the end".
45	3	Lulu, Rostal & Schaefer, Percy Edwards, Allan Cuthbertson, Damaris Hayman, Les Rawlings, Johnny Shannon, Henry Cooper	John Ammonds	Eddie Braben	19 January 1973	N/A
The opening spot sees Eric nurturing an injured bird; this is followed by the duo performing with the Harpenden String Quartet. Henry Cooper features in the Bully on the bench sketch (later reused at Thames with Mick McManus in the role), a Nelson quickie and Lulu is introduced before her dance routine with the duo; Percy Edwards and his bird calls feature in the closing sketch based in the pair's garden.
46	4	Susan Hampshire, Georgie Fame & Alan Price, The Settlers, Ann Hamilton, Janet Webb, Jenny Lee-Wright, Percy Edwards	Ernest Maxin	Eddie Braben	26 January 1973	N/A
This show featured The Mighty Kong as the closing play and featured the actress Susan Hampshire as the love interest. Percy Edwards provided the animal and bird noises for the play but did not appear in the show.
47	5	Frank Finlay, Wilma Reading, Design, Ann Hamilton, Janet Webb, Maryetta Midgley, Vernon Midgley	John Ammonds	Eddie Braben	2 February 1973	N/A
Having appeared as the title role in the BBC's own adaptation of Casanova in 1971, Frank Finlay appears in the play Lust Over London which centres around the main characters of Casanova and Moveova with long-time collaborator Ann Hamilton providing the love interest. With music from Design and Wilma Reading who sang "I Don't Know How to Love Him".
48	6	Helen Reddy, Alex Welsh & His Band, Allan Cuthbertson, Frank Williams, Michael Brennan, Raymond Mason, Mike Yarwood (Voice only), Grazina Frame, Christine Shaw	John Ammonds	Eddie Braben	9 February 1973	N/A
Health Food Shop, Flat Sketch (Mike Yarwood's impression of Hughie Green features in this sketch, voice only).
49	7	Anita Harris, Anthony Sharp, Ann Hamilton, Reg Lye	John Ammonds	Eddie Braben	16 February 1973	N/A
Note: This programme was the subject of a documentary made by the BBC's Omnibus team entitled Fools Rush In... which traced the production of a Morecambe & Wise Show from its inception at the script read-through stage, through to the filming of the final product. It featured a scene set in 10 Downing Street which was closely followed in the documentary, with music from Anita Harris. The show was written by Eddie Braben, and he is featured on the accompanying documentary being interviewed, as is producer John Ammonds among others.
50	8	Wilma Reading, Springfield Revival, Allan Cuthbertson, Ann Hamilton, Jan Rossini	John Ammonds	Eddie Braben	23 February 1973	N/A
Eric attempts to make Ernie join his mucky movie club in the opening spot, followed by a visual quickie about historical trees; Ern's Hollywood party impressions is followed by Byron Meets Keats (penned by Mike Kinsey) then the pair's memories of school, followed by a visit to the bank to secure Ernie's legacy
51	9	Hannah Gordon, Mary Travers, Christopher Neil, Anthony Sharp, Raymond Mason, Christine Shaw, Hatti Riemer	John Ammonds	Eddie Braben	2 March 1973	N/A
The opening spot centres around Ernie’s birthday followed by a cricket skit; the short marriage ceremony sketch precedes shopping in the supermarket with Hannah Gordon after which she gets a script for the epic The Moon & 2 1/2p
52	10	Roy Castle, Pete Murray, Anne Murray, The Pattersons, Raymond Mason, Les Rawlings, Johnny Vyvyan, John East, Hugh Elton, Charles Finch, Eric French	John Ammonds	Mike Craig and Lawrie Kinsley. Barry Cryer (opening wig sketch).	9 March 1973	N/A
The opening spot sees Eric wearing a wig followed by a sketch in a television shop; Roy Castle is introduced as Ernie’s new partner and visits the flat before performing Side By Side with the duo; a poacher short is followed by a film set visit before the closing play Call Of The Yukon.
53	11	Nana Mouskouri, The Black & White Minstrels, Sooty with Harry Corbett, George Hamilton IV, Grazina Frame, Constance Carling, Johnny Vyvyan	John Ammonds	Eddie Braben	16 March 1973	N/A
Eric announces he is leaving in the opening spot, followed Nana Mouskouri performing with The Athenians before the duo perform their own Greek Dance to the singer; The Sooty Show is then spoofed with Harry Corbett appearing at the end with the "real" Sooty; the duo discuss their birth certificates; a cigar commercial spoof is followed by a Mame routine with the Black & White Minstrels; the closing song is Following You Around.
54	12	Peter Cushing, Bernie Winters, Wilma Reading, Alan Price, Georgie Fame	John Ammonds	Eddie Braben. Mike Craig and Lawrie Kinsley (Dickens sketch).	23 March 1973	N/A
In the opening spot, Eric tries to get Ernie's autograph; Ernest Wise Reads Dickens; Alan Price and Georgie Fame perform "You Are My Sunshine"; Ernie is considering replacing Eric before Wilma Reading sings; Peter Cushing returns still demanding payment, then performs "A Couple Of Swells" with the pair; Flat sketch where Ernies finally replaces Eric; Bring Me Sunshine closes the show with Cushing joining the duo to perform the exit dance.

== The Morecambe & Wise Christmas Show (1973) ==
No.	Guests	Directed by	Written by	Original release date	Viewers (millions)
55	Vanessa Redgrave, Hannah Gordon, John Hanson, The New Seekers	John Ammonds	Eddie Braben	25 December 1973	N/A
By this time, an established running gag was that our intrepid duo could not get stars to work with them, and this show features four cameo appearances from Yehudi Menuhin, Rudolf Nureyev, Laurence Olivier and André Previn all making excuses not to appear. Perhaps the most memorable is Lord Olivier who pretends to be a Chinese Laundry attendant over the telephone. Vanessa Redgrave joins in the Latin American Extravaganza, and the Napoleon & Josephine play, with music by John Hanson. Another memorable scene from this show is Hannah Gordon's effort to sing the song The Windmills of Your Mind used in the film The Thomas Crown Affair against a wind generator. This show was interspersed with short film segments from Yehudi Menuhin, Rudolf Nureyev, Laurence Olivier, André Previn. From this show until the final BBC outing in 1977 all shows featured the familiar yellow and brown tabs with the "M" and "W" motif.

== Series Eight (September–November 1974) ==
First regular appearance of Arthur Tolcher as the harmonica player ("Not now, Arthur") (Note: Arthur Tolcher had appeared in the 1971 and 1973 Christmas Shows and was a collaborator with the duo from their variety days.)

No. overall	No. in series	Guests	Directed by	Written by	Original release date	Viewers (millions)
56	1	André Previn, Magnus Magnusson, Wilma Reading, Mrs Mills, Arthur Tolcher	John Ammonds	Eddie Braben	27 September 1974	N/A
Predictability is a concern in the opening spot, then Previn is lured back to appear, followed by a Mastermind spoof with Magnus Magnusson, "Queen Of The Ivories" Mrs. Mills appears before the duo discuss childhood memories; a city gents dance routine precedes the Ernie Wise play Hamlet and the closing theme song.
57	2	Ludovic Kennedy, Wilma Reading, Allan Cuthbertson, Gordon Gostelow, Anita Tibbles, Arthur Tolcher	John Ammonds	Eddie Braben	4 October 1974	N/A
Ernie has a pain in the leg in the opening spot, then Ludovic Kennedy discusses the "Art Of Conversation" followed by two quickies: "No Jokes" and "Holiday Plans". A sketch of the colonel on the train precedes the Ernie Wise play Death Cottage and a song and dance number Give My Regards To Broadway before the closing theme song. Note: this episode has a fault on the master recording resulting in the film freezing whilst the sound remains; it was released on DVD in July 2010 in this format.
58	3	The Syd Lawrence Orchestra, Wilma Reading, Jo Rowbottom, Aimée Delamain, Grazina Frame, Roy Sampson, Arthur Tolcher.	John Ammonds	Eddie Braben	11 October 1974	N/A
Eric memorably appears as "Spick Sparkle" the new pop sensation in the opening spot performing The Sailor With The Navy Blue Eyes; a cigarette cards quickie is followed by the city gents dancing; then Eric's new nose, the contortionist's accident and a flat sketch featuring Ernie's new secretary.
59	4	Richard Baker, Wilma Reading, A. J. Brown, Raymond Mason, Arthur Tolcher, Frank Finlay, Susan Hampshire, Glenda Jackson, Francis Matthews	John Ammonds	Eddie Braben	18 October 1974	N/A
In the opening spot Eric has lost his voice, followed by The Connoisseurs who discuss wine; Great Authors Of Our Time is featured followed by Wilma Reading singing, and Francis Matthews is introduced before his appearance in the play Murder In Mayfair.
60	5	Hughie Green, David Dimbleby, Arthur Tolcher, Ann Hamilton, Wilma Reading	John Ammonds	Eddie Braben	25 October 1974	N/A
Ernie is presented with a throne in the opening spot, followed by Opportunity Knocks with Hughie Green; Eric & Ern Junior appear before a Salvation Army interview with David Dimbleby who joins the pair to sing Friendship before the closing theme song
61	6	June Whitfield, Arthur Tolcher, Wilma Reading, John Quayle, Jenny Lee-Wright	John Ammonds	Eddie Braben	1 November 1974	N/A
Eric has delusions as the "Bard Of Harpenden" in the opening spot; followed by an Echo In The Well spoof; this time Ernie has lost love before the final play The Plantation Of Passion featuring June Whitfield and the closing theme song.

== Parkinson Takes A Christmas Look At Morecambe & Wise 1974 ==
Not a standard Christmas special - instead a compilation presented by Michael Parkinson.

No.	Guests	Directed by	Written by	Original release date	Viewers (millions)
62	Michael Parkinson	-	-	25 December 1974	N/A
This was the only year that the duo were with the BBC that no festive programme was made and there was a decrease in their output after this time. Instead of a new show, the pair were instead interviewed by Michael Parkinson who also introduced some of their most memorable clips from previous shows. Again, the programme was broadcast on the evening on 25 December but, other than the interview, there was no new footage available. Their slot was filled by The Mike Yarwood Show and the interview shown at 11:25pm.

== The Morecambe & Wise (Christmas) Show 1975 ==
Only episode produced in 1975.

No.	Guests	Directed by	Written by	Original release date	Viewers (millions)
63	Diana Rigg, Des O'Connor, Gordon Jackson, Robin Day, Diane Solomon, Brenda Arnau, Ann Hamilton, Pan's People, Reg Turner, Debbie Ash, Fiona Grey	Ernest Maxin	Eddie Braben	25 December 1975	N/A
After no Christmas Show in 1974 and no regular shows during 1975 when the duo had been presenting and appearing in the BBC show It's Childsplay, the pair made a welcome return to their established format with another festive offering; the opening routine which features the much-maligned Des O'Connor is one of the most repeated pieces of material. The show concludes with the historical romp Nell Gwynne which features the first location shots used for an end-of-show play with Diana Rigg in the title role and Gordon Jackson parodying his own character from Upstairs, Downstairs. The show is interspersed with Robin Day who, over the course of the programme has his "friendly" discussion turned into a brawl. At the end of the programme, as Morecambe and Wise close with the song Positive Thinking, he is seen to stagger past with the aid of a walking stick. The show also features a parody of Big Spender with Eric and Ernie as dancers. This show utilised the opening credits from the following years' series and did not feature the word "Christmas" in the title.

== Series Nine (January–April 1976) ==
Final series produced for the BBC.

No. overall	No. in series	Guests	Directed by	Written by	Original release date	Viewers (millions)
64	1	Gilbert O'Sullivan, Dilys Watling, The Vernons, Peter O'Sullevan, Arthur Tolcher, Clare Russell, Eve Blanchard	Ernest Maxin	Eddie Braben	7 January 1976	N/A
Opening Spot (Hands Off Little Ern), Male Nannies, Gilbert O'Sullivan, Not Now Arthur, Dancing Drunks, Ern's play is entitled The Legend Of Dick Turpin and features Dily Watling and a cameo appearance from commentator Peter O'Sullevan in a house racing spoof ending with the traditional closing song.
65	2	Michele Dotrice, Frankie Vaughan, Patrick Moore, Tammy Jones, Jenny Lee-Wright, David Prowse	Ernest Maxin	Eddie Braben	21 January 1976	N/A
The opening spot centres around the fact that Ern's wife has left him, which is followed by a return to the ever-popular monks skit; a quickie about fencing is followed by a spoof of The Sky At Night after which Patrick Moore performs on the xylophone; the Harpenden Happy Shots band perform before the play The Handyman & Milady after which the duo perform Nobody Does It Like Me with Michele Dotrice, closing with the familiar end song.
66	3	Lena Zavaroni, The Spinners, Ann Hamilton, Allan Cuthbertson	Ernest Maxin	Eddie Braben	11 February 1976	N/A
Opening Spot (Statue Or Ern?), pre-teen singer Lena Zavaroni performs "Something 'Bout Ya Baby I Like", Irritating Eric, The Connoisseurs return to discuss the merits of the humble British sausage, followed by the closing song.
67	4	Deryck Guyler, Gerald Case	Ernest Maxin	Eddie Braben	10 March 1976	N/A
Opening Spot (Scottish Dance), The Connoisseurs, Eric visits the chemists' shop, Tap Dancing, a flat-based sketch sees Wise getting fit and showing Morecambe his new backyard gym, then the play Lives Of The Bengal Lancers with Gerald Case and the closing song.
68	5	The Karlins, Vincent Zarra, Ann Hamilton, Steven Payne, Norman Percival, The Geraldine Yates Dancers	Ernest Maxin	Eddie Braben	24 March 1976	N/A
Opening Spot (Eric Quits), Disappearing Piano, the parody "Slaughter On Western Avenue" dance routine follows; a spoof guest introduction for Frank Sinatra sees the duo watch the singer perform "Come Fly With Me" from the wings (he does not actually appear) then a flat sketch on sunbathing and the closing song.
69	6	Gilbert O'Sullivan, Dilys Watling, The Vernons, Peter O'Sullevan, Arthur Tolcher, Clare Russell, Eve Blanchard	Ernest Maxin	Eddie Braben	19 April 1976	N/A
Opening Spot (Freedom Of The City), Champagne, Immigration Office, the classic breakfast routine around David Rose's "The Stripper" is followed by a sketch in a calculator shop and a short bank hold-up where the felon passes notes to the bank clerk; Wise is interviewed in a flat-based sketch for a magazine on how to write like what he does, followed by the closing song.

== The Morecambe & Wise (Christmas) Show 1976 ==
No.	Guests	Directed by	Written by	Original release date	Viewers (millions)
70	Elton John, John Thaw, Dennis Waterman, Kate O'Mara, Marion Montgomery, The Nolans, Angela Rippon, Gertan Klauber	Ernest Maxin	Barry Cryer & John Junkin	25 December 1976	N/A
Cryer and Junkin replaced Eddie Braben for this special, which featured The Sweeney stars John Thaw and Dennis Waterman, Elton John, Angela Rippon, plus a cameo appearance by Des O'Connor. This show featured the "newsflash" in which Rippon's desk splits in two to reveal her legs, followed by a song and dance routine. The opening credits are in a cartoon style with the duo appearing as caricatures of themselves having a snowball fight, this title sequence was only used once, and the word Christmas does not appear, whilst closing credits featured baby photographs of the cast, a tradition carried on from the previous years' festive special.

== Eric & Ernie's Christmas Show 1977 ==
Last Morecambe & Wise episode produced for the BBC. Ratings estimated at 21.1m.

No.	Guests	Directed by	Written by	Original release date	Viewers (millions)
71	Penelope Keith, Elton John, Angharad Rees, Francis Matthews, Michael Parkinson, Michael Aspel, Richard Baker, Frank Bough, Philip Jenkinson, Kenneth Kendall, Barry Norman, Eddie Waring, Richard Whitmore, Peter Woods, Arthur Lowe, John Le Mesurier, John Laurie, Richard Briers, Paul Eddington, James Hunt, Stella Starr, Angela Rippon, Sandra Dainty, Jenny Lee-Wright, Valerie Leon	Ernest Maxin	Eddie Braben	25 December 1977	21.1 million
The final BBC Christmas Show attracted audience figures of over 21 million, a record for the show, although it was beaten in the ratings by The Mike Yarwood Show earlier in the evening schedule; this was also the first time that Morecambe and Wise's first names were used in the opening titles. The following opening sequence features a parody of Starsky and Hutch, in which the comics star as 'Starkers' and 'Krutch', driving through the streets in a red Mini Clubman emblazoned with the same white vector stripe as seen on the Ford Torino. Boasting the longest guest list of all their shows, members of the cast of Dad's Army and The Good Life appeared, as did Elton John and Angharad Rees (who performed "Baby, It's Cold Outside"). A host of news presenters took part in the "There Is Nothing Like A Dame" routine as listed above. Angela Rippon also made an appearance, which had been intended as a surprise. When news leaked of her contribution days before Christmas, the BBC began an investigation into how the leak occurred and contemporary press reports claimed that staff were fired from the corporation over the leak.

== Home media ==
Through the early 1980s, VHS compilations were issued by the BBC including one dedicated to the pair's Musical Extravaganzas as well as some from their later years at Thames Television titled as Eric & Ernie's Xmas Show and featuring highlights from the 1978, 1979 and 1980 seasonal specials. Reader's Digest also issued a five-volume Best Of... series of VHS cassettes in 1993 using footage from the BBC series, the first three of which featured interview footage and interlinking material from Wise, Braben and Maxin filmed especially for the tapes. Under the Comedy Greats title, the BBC issued a compilation in 1996 which included limited edition postcards of the duo during their time at the BBC.

The first series of the show was wiped from the BBC archives and, for over ten years, only 25 minutes of one episode was known to survive; this was included on the DVD release of the complete second series in 2007. Also in 2007 the complete third series was released including the Golden Rose Of Montreux episode. The complete set of Christmas Shows was released as a three-disc set in November 2007. The fourth series was released on DVD in April 2008 but does not include the sixth episode of the series, which no longer existed at the time. It was recovered by Gary Morecambe, Eric's son, in 2020, and received a full colour recovery from the black and white telerecording film copy. The fifth series was released on 4 May 2009. The sixth series has been released on 3 August 2009. The seventh series was released on 3 May 2010. The eighth series was released on 5 July 2010, and the ninth series was released on 23 August 2010.

A complete box-set containing all nine series and eight Christmas specials (not included was the 1974 Michael Parkinson Christmas programme) was released on 4 October 2010. The first series of Thames Television shows together with the first four specials was released by Network in 2010, releasing for the first time since its initial broadcast the Christmas With Morecambe & Wise programme hosted by David Frost on 25 December 1979. This show featured the last on-screen meetings between the duo and long-time associates Arthur Tolcher and Janet Webb with guest appearances by Glenda Jackson, Des O'Connor and Garfield Morgan.

Series 1 episode 2 was recovered as a black and white film copy from an old film storage facility in Nigeria in 2011 by archivist Philip Morris, but was suffering from a rare film decay known as "tri-acetate film degradation", and was unable to be used - footage from the reel has been in the process of recovery via use of laser cutting, x-ray scans and digital restoration since 2017.

In 2018, Morris visited an abandoned cinema in Freetown, Sierra Leone, and recovered a further two episodes from Series 1 (5 and 7), which now exist as colour restored film copies. They are rebroadcast every year on Christmas and Boxing Day. In May 2022, a new DVD release was announced entitled "Morecambe & Wise: The Lost Tapes". This featured fully coloured restorations of three of the four existing episodes of Series 1, plus as full a restoration as possible of the badly degraded episode 2, as well as the existing audio tracks of the remaining missing episodes. Additionally, a full colour restoration of the episode discovered by Gary Morecambe in 2020 is included, as well as an uncut studio recording from 1972, and various other features.

Disc Title	Discs	Year	Episode Count	Release dates	
Disc Title	Discs	Year	Episode Count	Region 2	Region 4
Surviving Footage from The First Series and The Complete Second Series	2	1968–1969	5	4 June 2007	
The Complete Third Series	2	1970	7	6 August 2007	
The Complete Fourth Series	2	1970	5	3 April 2008	
The Complete Fifth Series	2	1971	7	4 May 2009	
The Complete Sixth Series	2	1971	6	3 August 2009	
The Complete Seventh Series	3	1973	12	3 May 2010	
The Complete Eighth Series	2	1974	6	5 July 2010	
The Complete Ninth Series	2	1976	6	23 August 2010	
The BBC Christmas Specials	3	1969–1977	8	11 November 2007	
The Lost Tapes	1	1968–1972	8	6 June 2022	
The Complete BBC Collection	20	1968–1977	62	4 October 2010	
The Best Of...	1	1968–1977	1 Compilation	1 October 2001	

== See also ==
- List of Two of a Kind episodes (ATV series)
- List of The Morecambe & Wise Show (1978 TV series) episodes (Thames series)
