= List of The Morecambe & Wise Show (1978 TV series) episodes =

This is an episode summary of British TV comedy series The Morecambe and Wise Show on ITV, made by Thames Television. Starring Morecambe and Wise, this was the second show of this title to feature the pair (after their BBC show). It ran for a total of four series and seven specials between 1978 and 1983.

== Overview ==
Series	Episodes	Originally released	
Series	Episodes	First released	Last released
Special		18 October 1978	
Special		25 December 1978	
Special		25 December 1979	
1	6	3 September 1980	8 October 1980
Special		25 December 1980	
2	7	1 September 1981	13 October 1981
Special		23 December 1981	
3	7	27 October 1982	8 December 1982
Special		27 December 1982	
4	6	7 September 1983	19 October 1983
Special		26 December 1983	

== First special (1978) ==
No.	Guests	Directed by	Written by	Original release date	Viewers (millions)
1	Donald Sinden, Judi Dench, Leonard Sachs, Peter Cushing, Derek Griffiths, Syd Lawrence, Ann Hamilton, Kenneth Watson	Keith Beckett	Barry Cryer & John Junkin	18 October 1978	18.7m
No series was made in 1978 in an effort to make the Christmas Show stronger, but there was one hour-long offering (the same length as the BBC shows had been, but with adverts). This opened with a sequence whereby a Vauxhall Chevette with a Thames Television logo emblazoned on its side appears at Thames Television's studios, and then a Ford Transit van with a BBC logo emblazoned on its side suddenly arrives, the back doors are flung open, and Eric Morecambe and Ernie Wise are thrown out in front of the studios, in a direct nod to the bad feeling that was present at the time the partnership had departed their previous employers. The format remained reasonably faithful to that used previously although Eddie Braben did not join them immediately. There's the familiar end-of-show play "What Ern Wrote", this time it is a pastiche of Dr Jekyll & Mrs Hyde: however, there is a more cinematic feel to the parody and it moves beyond the confines of being a single set stage piece. There is also a pet shop sketch with the "Will he come out for a bit of Kit Kat?" line, itself a nod to the fact the duo were now on commercial television. Midway through the show, Donald Sinden, already familiar as a butler in his show Two's Company, does the sketch "Butler of the Year" in which he tries to teach Morecambe and Wise the art of butler's work. The show closes with Walkin' in the Sunshine rather than Bring Me Sunshine. The episode is available on DVD as part of a Thames TV set released in March 2008.

== Eric & Ernie's Xmas Show (1978) ==
No.	Guests	Directed by	Written by	Original release date	Viewers (millions)
2	Leonard Rossiter, Frank Finlay, Sir Harold Wilson, Eamonn Andrews, Nicholas Parsons, Frank Coda	Keith Beckett	Barry Cryer & John Junkin	25 December 1978	19.15m
The show opens with Morecambe being stuck on one side of the stage with his suit on the other, resorting to increasingly absurd ways to cross the stage, whilst Wise reads out messages from Christmas cards received by the duo. The line-up for this first Thames Christmas Show featured several guest stars. A spoof dance routine featuring 'Anna Ford' opened the show, but since Ford herself had refused to appear, a stand in was used, with camera angles and slapstick comedy carefully concealing her face. Leonard Rossiter provided the third Andrews Sister in a "Fabulous Forties" segment; and a spoof This Is Your Life with the Royal Family opening the show. Former Labour Prime Minister Harold Wilson made a surprise appearance, though this was leaked in the press in advance. In one sequence, Wilson manages to upset Morecambe by joking about his beloved Luton Town Football Club; Morecambe then disappears to the back of the flat, returning with a Maggie Rules O.K. banner, a reference to Conservative opposition leader Margaret Thatcher (who would become Prime Minister the following year). The show was written by Barry Cryer and John Junkin (who also make cameo appearances) with Eddie Braben still under contract to the BBC until the following year. The show closes with a song and dance routine rather than Bring Me Sunshine

== Christmas With Eric & Ernie (1979) ==
No.	Guests	Directed by	Written by	Original release date	Viewers (millions)
3	Glenda Jackson, David Frost, Garfield Morgan, Des O'Connor, Janet Webb, Arthur Tolcher	John Ammonds & Keith Beckett	-	25 December 1979	N/A
This was the only television programme the duo made in this year, with Morecambe's heart attack ensuing a lull in their activities. To a certain extent, the duo's output was seen to be "playing it safe" by bringing back safe and established guest stars and this edition saw the return of actress Glenda Jackson and the inevitable Des O'Connor as well as newcomer to the show, David Frost, who interviewed the duo about their long career. The show was more of an interview on the whole, but there was some newly made material, the stand-out section being a mimed version of the novelty song I Tawt I Taw A Puddy Tat with Morecambe as the mischievous Sylvester the Cat and Wise as Tweety (lip-synching to a recording of Mel Blanc as both characters). Harking back to the duo's previous incarnation at the BBC the programme also featured Arthur Tolcher (not now, Arthur!) and Janet Webb who had appeared at the end of their show ten years previously as "the lady who comes down at the end." The show played heavily on the pair's previous success with their festive programmes, and further cemented their relationship with the viewing public by appearing despite Morecambe's poor health. As a joke on his recent heart by-pass operation, Morecambe was not permitted to descend the staircase in the studio and this duty was performed by Garfield Morgan. However, when Morecambe did appear, he ran up and down the same staircase several times to prove his fitness. When united with Wise the pair embraced and stated how good it was to be back together again. They returned to form the following year with another full series, their first since 1976.

== Series One (September–October 1980) ==
No. overall	No. in series	Guests	Directed by	Written by	Original release date	Viewers (millions)
4	1	Terry Wogan	John Ammonds	Eddie Braben	3 September 1980	16.45m
The traditional opening spot sees Wise attempting to present Ern's Gala Night only to be interrupted by Morecambe who appears dressed as an explorer. This is followed by a sketch featuring a remote control on the television and a Mastermind parody. A Songs Of The Highlands skit follows, then an MI6 sketch on a park bench. A spoof tobacco advert is followed by a flat-based sketch which is largely a rehash of a routine done with Cliff Richard some years earlier with the BBC although there are updates; notably, the production number at the end of the sketch is different, being Painting The Clouds With Sunshine and closing with Wogan accompanying Wise to sing Bring Me Sunshine to be interrupted by Morecambe.
5	2	Hannah Gordon, Hugh Paddick, Frank Coda	John Ammonds	Eddie Braben	10 September 1980	18.0m
The opening sketch sees Wise again attempting to perform a song to be interrupted by Morecambe as a "Hell's Grandad" a rehash of the BBC sketch featuring "Spick Sparkle". This is followed by a guest spot by Hannah Gordon who performs the Banana Boat Song (again reusing material from a BBC sketch featuring Nina. This is followed by a spoof bell-ringing short, and a flat sketch with the "fellow writer" is directly copied from a previous BBC incarnation too. Only the nature of the comedy in this sketch have dated it somewhat, with stereotypical allusions to homosexuality. Gordon then accompanies Wise to perform Bring Me Sunshine only to be interrupted by Morecambe once again as the credits roll.
6	3	David Prowse, Anthony Chinn, Raymond Mason, Fiesta Mai Ling	John Ammonds	Eddie Braben	17 September 1980	16.70m
The opening scene sees Ernie's bodyguard "Cosmo" appear (fresh from his appearance as Darth Vader in the Star Wars films); this is followed by a visual sketch focusing on shoes, and a skit set in a shop in which Wise attempts to purchase a television from Morecambe. There is then a new sketch set in a Chinese Restaurant and a spoof interview "Focus On The Arts". A doctors' surgery sketch in which Morecambe has lost his voice follows, closing with a two-handed flat-based sketch focusing on reading material; Wise performs Bring Me Sunshine to close, again interrupted by Morecambe who tries to fight his way through the curtain tabs which are sealed.
7	4	Deryck Guyler, Gerald Case	John Ammonds	Eddie Braben	24 September 1980	17.10m
The opening sketch is a rehash of an earlier BBC This Is Your Life parody in which Wise is supposedly presented with the famous red book. This is followed by a hotel reception sketch where Morecambe attempt to check into Wise's hotel and a short skit where the duo play the card game snap. Morecambe then attempts a ventriloquist act with disastrous results. This episode features a flat-based sketch where a local vicar turns out to be a champion spoon and washboard champion. In line with other programmes in this series, Guyler plays the drums to the signature tune Bring Me Sunshine with Wise, whilst Morecambe "goes and waits for the bus" only to disturb the song.
8	5	Suzanne Danielle, Tessa Wyatt, Valerie Minfie	John Ammonds	Eddie Braben	1 October 1980	17.60m
The opening sketch features a painting which Morecambe has purchased at a bargain price; Morecambe then appears in drag as Marlene Dietrich in a short parody; a short visual gag about stealing milk bottles follows, and a park based sketch with Morecambe as a policeman. A travel agent sketch featuring Morecambe's largely mute wife follows. With further reworkings from the BBC era the flat sketch features a budding writer character (the BBC routine featured a character that Morecambe refers to as "Miss Flanagan & Allen", and The pay-off to the flat-based sketch sees sitcom star Tessa Wyatt appear and she also performs the final song with Wise, whilst Morecambe again disappears only to reappear and disrupt the proceedings.
9	6	Gemma Craven	John Ammonds	Eddie Braben	8 October 1980	18.65m
In another reworking of a popular BBC routine, Morecambe appears as Mr. Fantastic (the BBC version having been Mr. Memory). A short window cleaner sketch is followed by another BBC reworking as a Foreign Legion spoof. The flat sketch again reuses material where Wise has employed an au pair girl with predictable results; Gemma Craven features in this sketch and then joins Wise in another Gene Kelly recreation, this time to an arrangement of "Bring Me Sunshine" as a pastiche of An American In Paris whilst Morecambe interrupts the proceedings in usual riotous style bringing chaos to the routine to Wise's chagrin.

== The Morecambe & Wise Christmas Show (1980) ==
No.	Guests	Directed by	Written by	Original release date	Viewers (millions)
10	Peter Barkworth, Glenda Jackson, Jill Gascoigne, Hannah Gordon, Peter Cushing, Alec Guinness, Peter Vaughan, Gemma Craven	John Ammonds	Eddie Braben	25 December 1980	14.60m
Another outing sees further material reused; the opening spot on-stage is however largely new and sees Eric presenting Ernie with a life-sized monogrammed wallet which he is at times duly trapped inside; following this Mick McManus replaces Henry Cooper in a reworked sketch, Jill Gascoigne visits the duo for dinner (previously Ann Hamilton had appeared in this sketch), a new Rolf Harris sketch also features (although this was edited out of the recent Complete Thames series box set release by Network), Alec Guinness is the doctor who sees two as one, and Peter Barkworth provides the butt for jokes in the Ernie Wise's Hamlet skit at the end. The show closed with the signature tune Bring Me Sunshine.

== Series Two (September–October 1981) ==
No. overall	No. in series	Guests	Directed by	Written by	Original release date	Viewers (millions)
11	1	Gemma Craven	John Ammonds	Eddie Braben	1 September 1981	13.30m
Opening Spot, Army Reunion, Art Gallery, Marriage Guidance, Are We Past It?, Eric's Plaster Cast, Springtime In The Park, End Song
12	2	Richard Vernon, Max Bygraves	John Ammonds	Eddie Braben	8 September 1981	12.81m
Opening Spot (Novelty Bicycle), The Connoisseurs discuss the finer points of British Rail catering, the pair discuss splitting up followed by Max Bygraves who joins them to perform Bring Me Sunshine to close.
13	3	Diane Keen	John Ammonds	Eddie Braben	15 September 1981	12.63m
Opening Spot, Mad Morecambe The Wrestler, Pet Shop, Ernie's Female Doctor, The Travel Song, End Song
14	4	Hannah Gordon, Richard Chisholm, Richard Vernon, Frank Coda	John Ammonds	Eddie Braben	22 September 1981	N/A
The Opening Spot features a previously used BBC sketch entitled Miracle Hair Restorer with some popular culture reference updates, The Connoisseurs then discuss objet d'art followed by a further reused BBC sketch featuring bathtime for Ern, closing with the usual end song.
15	5	Peter Bowles, Suzanne Dannielle	John Ammonds	Eddie Braben	27 September 1981	13.34m
The usual opening spot sees Morecambe using the latest in technology to videotape Wise; a reused BBC sketch featuring a disappearing doctors' patient is followed by a new beekeeper sketch, then a flat routine centred around Ernie's Book Of Health, Suzanne Danielle performers her rendition of "All That Jazz" with the pair, followed by the traditional closing song
16	6	Robert Hardy, Ian Ogilvy, Kay Korda	John Ammonds	Eddie Braben	6 October 1981	13.42m
Opening Spot, Eric The Gypsy, Boots In The Hall, Legionnaires Sketch, Acting Advice, End Song
17	7	Joanna Lumley, Richard Vernon	John Ammonds	Eddie Braben	13 October 1981	14.54m
Opening Spot (Pickpocket), The Connoisseurs return to discuss the merits of motorway service station food and Joanna Lumley appears in the play The Barretts Of Wimpole Street which concludes with the three performing Thoroughly Modern Millie before the closing song.

== Eric & Ernie's Christmas Show (1981) ==
No.	Guests	Directed by	Written by	Original release date	Viewers (millions)
18	Ralph Richardson, Robert Hardy, Ian Ogilvy, Susannah York, Alvin Stardust, Suzanne Danielle	John Ammonds	Eddie Braben	23 December 1981	16.65m
This show marked the first time in their television careers that their festive offering had not been broadcast on Christmas Night, the schedulers opting instead for 23 December. This was for an insurmountable reason which had never been a factor at the BBC: Christmas Day in 1981 fell on a Friday, and Thames Television was a weekday broadcaster, only on-air until 7pm on Fridays when it handed over to London Weekend Television (LWT). LWT would similarly hold the franchise for the next two Christmasses, effectively blocking a Christmas Day Morecambe and Wise show. Morecambe actually references the fact the show is not on Christmas Day within one of the sketches, gaining a round of applause from the studio audience. The guest list consisted of Ralph Richardson, Suzanne Danielle doing a Razzle Dazzle routine with the boys (and including future assistant on The Generation Game - Rosemarie Ford - in the dance troupe), a rehash of the BBC health food shop routine, now featuring Valerie Minfie, and the obligatory play, which was Julius Caesar, featuring Ian Ogilvy. This show saw M&W use technology more to gain laughs with blue screen techniques being used in some sketches, and ends with Bring Me Sunshine by the duo

== Series Three (October–December 1982) ==
All episodes were thirty minutes in length with advertisement breaks and shown on a Wednesday evening.

No. overall	No. in series	Guests	Directed by	Written by	Original release date	Viewers (millions)
19	1	Richard Briers & Diana Dors	John Ammonds	Eddie Braben	27 October 1982	11.70m
An opening sketch parodies Ernie's newly-grown moustache, then Benefits For Sixteen Children and Varsity Drag before Richard Briars features in the play what Ern wrote, a pirate ship parody entitled Captain Blood and Diana Dors joining Ernie for the end song Bring Me Sunshine.
20	2	Trevor Eve, Wayne Sleep & Jimmy Young	John Ammonds	Eddie Braben	3 November 1982	11.60m
The opening spot is an update of a BBC routine entitled Hands Off Little Ern, here updated to Save Little Ern here, the popular dancer Wayne Sleep then features in the Hollywood Ballet with the duo, followed by an update of a BBC play which had featured Keith Michell in Legion Of The Lost here changed to Beau Jest and now starring Trevor Eve, at the time famous as Eddie Shoestring, leading into the end song Bring Me Sunshine with Jimmy Young.
21	3	Roy Castle	John Ammonds	Eddie Braben	10 November 1982	11.75m
Opening Spot, Food Trolley, another doctors' surgerys sketch in which the patient (Eric) isn't feeling himself; the Copacabana dance routine features Roy Castle in a return performance; a Guinness Book Of Records skit precedes Bring Me Sunshine as the end song, again featuring Roy Castle. An extract from this programme is available in low resolution on YouTube, showing the musical number at the centre of the show.
22	4	Colin Welland & Isla St Clair	John Ammonds	Eddie Braben	17 November 1982	12.35m
Starting with an updated BBC sketch version of This Is Ern's Life with Eric substituting for Eamonn Andrews and into a country and western musical number; before closing with Bring Me Sunshine where Isla St. Clair, at the time Larry Grayson's hostess on the Generation Game duets with Ernie.
23	5	Patricia Brake, Royce Mills & Ruth Madoc	John Ammonds	Eddie Braben	24 November 1982	12.20m
The opening spot features Eric's enormous guard dog and is another skit reused from an earlier BBC show, this is followed by a visit to a shop for Ernie's new desk and typewriter with Royce Mills as the shop assistant; an update of the Ten Years Hence... sketch from an earlier BBC show leads into the boys in top hat and tails for Me & My Shadow before the closing song (Bring Me Sunshine) which Ernie performs with Ruth Madoc, fresh from her success in Hi-De-Hi!, the end credits advise that she appears by arrangement with the BBC.
24	6	Alan Dobie & Marian Monto	John Ammonds	Eddie Braben	1 December 1982	12.15m
In an updated BBC opening Spot The Great Nosmo appears as a mind-reader, followed by an Informative Neighbour quickie and Do I Feel High? performed by Marian Monto; the closing sketch is entitled Burgled & Conned and features Alan Dobie who was known to audiences for his recent performance in the BBC drama Kessler the previous year, with the end song Bring Me Sunshine as usual for this series.
25	7	Nigel Hawthorne, Patricia Brake & Valerie Minfie	John Ammonds	Eddie Braben	8 December 1982	11.95m
In the opening spot it is Ern's Birthday, followed by an update of the BBC sketch Lost In The Desert, a foreign legion parody; a Good Neighbours skit is followed by the Facts Of Life and a doctor routine with Valerie Minfie subtitled Just Not Myself, a guillotine quickie and the closing play, The Adventures Of Sherlock Holmes with Nigel Hawthorne as Moriarty and Patricia Brake as Bertha the maid; the end song is again Bring Me Sunshine

== The Morecambe and Wise Christmas Show (1982) ==
No.	Guests	Directed by	Written by	Original release date	Viewers (millions)
26	Robert Hardy, Rula Lenska, Richard Vernon, Wall Street Crash	John Ammonds	Eddie Braben	27 December 1982	11.50m
Returning from the previous seasonal show was All Creatures Great & Small star Robert Hardy, joined by both Rula Lenska and Richard Vernon who had appeared in previous shows; the opening routine perhaps prophetically discussed the retiring of the double act but this in itself was a further reworking of BBC material but somehow the pace of the dialogue was becoming lost. In an update of several older sketches, the Video Shop was offered as well as a Lingerie Shop and a Chattanooga Choo Choo routine (the blackface ending of this sketch was edited out of the recent Complete Thames series box set release by Network). The closing play was the Yukon Gold Rush featuring Rula Lenska. Notable of this and many other shows was the absence of the favourite signature tune over the end credits. Again, because Christmas Day fell on a weekend, when Thames was not the franchise holder, this show was not broadcast on Christmas Night but two evenings later.

== Series Four (September–October 1983) ==
All episodes were thirty minutes in length with advertisement breaks and shown on a Wednesday evening. Each episode concluded with a No Time For... feature, explaining there was no time left to produce one of the famous plays "wot Ern wrote", with a different subject each week.

No. overall	No. in series	Guests	Directed by	Written by	Original release date	Viewers (millions)
27	1	Margaret Courtney	Mark Stuart	Eddie Braben	7 September 1983	12.13m
The opening spot is followed by a quickie entitled A Good Ending, with a further BBC sketch reworked into Ghandi Morecambe; then Honeymoon Hotel and the song and dance routine The Waiter, The Porter & The Upstairs Maid featuring Maggie Moone. The show also features Margaret Courtenay who would go on to star in the pair's final film Night Train To Murder the next year. an antique renovations skit is followed by No Time For...Jolson
28	2	David Kernan	Mark Stuart	Eddie Braben	14 September 1983	13.26m
The usual opening spot is followed by a flat-based sketch revolving around the repairing of an electric blanket; a short Sacked By Mail skit is followed by the Swiss Slapping Dance (part of the duo's earliest routines revised and updated) leading into a Tyrolean Extravaganza and a return to the flat for repairs, closing with No Time For...Hunchback Of Notre Dame
29	3	Stutz Bear Catz	Mark Stuart	Eddie Braben	21 September 1983	11.90m
Following the usual opening spot, a flat sketch about warming up the bed features, then the Great Basket Escape and the language of birds which is reincarnated from a BBC sketch that featured Percy Edwards. The Chinese Musical is a song and dance number featuring the Stutz Bear Cats, this is followed by Eric's coin tricks and another reused flat sketch themed around there being nudists next door, closing with No Time For...Robin Hood
30	4	Stutz Bear Catz	Mark Stuart	Eddie Braben	5 October 1983	11.45m
After the opening spot, another new flat sketch features Eric's bedroom telescope, which is followed by a reworking of Ern's scrapbook from a BBC show; an unnamed star guest then chickens out and a Gypsy Dance song a dance number precedes the classic Old Men's Memories. A quickie entitled A Brush With The Law is followed by No Time For...Long John Silver
31	5	Stutz Bear Catz, Margaret Courtney	Mark Stuart	Eddie Braben	12 October 1983	12.92m
The opening spot is followed by a hand-bell players skit using The Bells Of St. Mary, a rehashed BBC sketch in a record shop is followed by a Frankie & Johnny routine; Mr. Bartholomew the Pigeon Man is a new sketch (featured later in video compilations) and the close features No Time For...Peter Pan
32	6	Harry Fowler Peter Finn, Valerie Minfie	Mark Stuart	Eddie Braben	19 October 1983	14.12m
For their final regular show the opening spot is followed by a flat-based sketch where the duo attempt to fix the bed, Eric then appears as a one-man band; a further reused BBC sketch featuring the male nannies in the park follows. An impresario requesting Ern is a reused BBC sketch that featured a spoof telephone call from Alfred Hitchcock (suitably updated following Hitchcock's death in 1980), a department store song and dance routing features Puttin' On The Ritz(part of the duo's earliest routines revised and updated) and the show closes with No Time For...Elvis

== Eric & Ernie's Christmas Show (1983) ==
No.	Guests	Directed by	Written by	Original release date	Viewers (millions)
33	Gemma Craven, Nigel Hawthorne, Derek Jacobi, Fulton Mackay, Nanette Newman, Peter Skellern, Patrick Mower, Burt Kwouk, Tony Monopoly, Philip Elsmore, Frank Coda	Mark Stuart	Eddie Braben	26 December 1983	11.20m
What was to be the duo's final festive offering was billed once again as Eric & Ernie's Christmas Show, broadcast this time on Boxing Day, as Thames was not the franchisee on Christmas Day. It featured some rehashed material from earlier BBC and ITV shows despite Eddie Braben's continued input. The most notable reused ideas were the Harpenden Hot-Shots and the final play "What Ern Wrote" was entitled The Planter's Wife and featured Nanette Newman in the titular role. This sketch was set in Malaysia with the musical ending performed by puppets. The sketch that had aired originally in the 1976 seasonal show with Elton John ("sounds like an exit on the motorway...") was thinly reworked here with Peter Skellern in the same role. A song-and-dance number of 'Swinging Down The Lane' remade from their ATV days closes the proceedings but there's no signature tune to be heard. Following the end of the show, Thames continuity announcer Philip Elsmore appears to introduce the rest of the evening's programmes including one starring Des O'Connor, with the duo appearing behind Elsmore to make derogatory remarks about the star in a long-standing in-joke; this would be the duo's final appearance as Morecambe died the following year.

== Home media ==
In the 1980s, Thames released a pair of VHS tapes; the first was the complete 1980 Christmas show, while the other was a compilation from the three that Morecambe and Wise had produced for the company at that point.

In 2008, the Network imprint released a two-DVD set containing the full first series with Thames Television, as well as the very first Thames episode, and the Christmas shows from 1978, 1979 and 1980.

In 2021, Network announced plans to release the remaining three series, and all of the specials, in a box set of all of the duo's work with Thames Television, with edits, along with a larger box set containing all of their existing output for ITV, including all of the remaining episodes of Two of a Kind, their 1961–1968 series for ATV. Additionally, a separate release of the pair's Christmas specials for Thames was also announced.

Disc Title	Discs	Year	Episode Count	Release Dates	
Disc Title	Discs	Year	Episode Count	Region 2	Region 4
The Morecambe & Wise Show - The Thames Years	2	1978-1980	10	24 March 2008	
Morecambe and Wise: The Christmas Specials	1	1978-1980	3	7 October 2013	
Morecambe & Wise At Thames	6	1978-1983	33	29 November 2021	
Morecambe & Wise - Xmas At ITV	2	1978-1983	6	8 November 2021	
Morecambe & Wise At ITV	14	1961-1968; 1978-1983	81	29 November 2021	

== See also ==
- List of Two of a Kind episodes (ATV series)
- List of The Morecambe & Wise Show (1968 TV series) episodes (BBC series)
