= List of The Morecambe & Wise Show episodes =

List of The Morecambe & Wise Show episodes can refer to:

- List of The Morecambe & Wise Show (1968 TV series) episodes - List of episodes from the 1968-77 BBC series
- List of The Morecambe & Wise Show (1978 TV series) episodes - List of episodes from the 1978-83 ITV series
