= The Morecambe & Wise Show (1968 TV series) =

British television comedy sketch series (1968–1977)

- Genre: Sketch show
- Written by: Dick Hills and Sid Green (1968); Eddie Braben (1969–77)
- Starring: Eric Morecambe; Ernie Wise
- Theme music composer: Arthur Kent and Sylvia Dee
- Ending theme: Bring Me Sunshine (Note: Although Bring Me Sunshine is regarded as Morecambe and Wise's signature tune, there were a number of songs that they used to close their shows, including Positive Thinking (Tony Hatch & Jackie Trent), We Get Along So Easily (Ray Davies/Al Stillman) and Following You Around (Sylvan Whittingham). Additionally the first several series continued to use the theme tune from the duo's previous show Two of a Kind.)
- Country of origin: United Kingdom
- Original language: English
- No. of series: 9
- No. of episodes: 71 (3 missing) (list of episodes)

Production
- Producers: John Ammonds (1968–74); Ernest Maxin (1975–77)
- Running time: 30–65 minutes
- Production company: BBC

Original release
- Network: BBC2 (Note: repeated on BBC1)
- Release: 2 September 1968 – 15 July 1971
- Network: BBC1
- Release: 19 September 1971 – 25 December 1977

Related
- Running Wild; Two of a Kind; The Morecambe & Wise Show (1978–1983)

The Morecambe & Wise Show is a comedy sketch show originally broadcast by BBC Television, and the third TV series by English comedy double-act Morecambe and Wise. A continuation of the duo's format from Two of a Kind (called The Morecambe & Wise Show in its final two series) on ATV, it debuted in 1968 on BBC2, with the move to BBC Television specifically because BBC2 was then the only channel broadcasting in colour.

The Morecambe & Wise Show was popular enough to be moved to BBC1 in 1971, with its Christmas specials garnering prime-time audiences in excess of 20 million, some of the largest in British television history.

After their 1977 Christmas show, Morecambe and Wise left the BBC and signed with Thames Television, marking their return to the ITV network. The Morecambe & Wise Show title (or close variations thereof) continued to be used for many of these ITV shows.

== History ==
In early 1968, Eric Morecambe and Ernie Wise were due to begin negotiations over a new contract with ATV. The duo had starred in their successful television series, Two of a Kind, since 1961, which had proven a significant rating success for ITV. However, the series was still broadcast in black and white, as ITV had yet to begin colour transmissions.

The managing director of ATV, Lew Grade, made Morecambe and Wise an offer totalling £39,000 over three years, in return for three series of thirteen 25-minute episodes. However, the duo determined that, in order to improve the quality of their product, they would not only need more money but also access to colour production facilities. Grade's inability to grant them a series in colour led to their agent, Michael Grade (who happened to be Lew Grade's nephew (Note: Michael Grade was an associate of Morecambe and Wise's agent, Billy Marsh, who was unavailable at the time of the negotiation)) contacting Bill Cotton, the Head of Variety at BBC television. In a short period of time, a three-year deal was negotiated for Morecambe and Wise to move to the BBC. This deal not only encompassed more money than they had been receiving from ATV (and than had been offered by Lew Grade), but also the opportunity to broadcast in colour. At the time, BBC2 was the only station in Britain transmitting in colour, and so the agreement was that the new series would initially be transmitted on BBC2, before receiving a repeat showing in black and white on BBC1.

As part of the deal agreed with the BBC, the duo's regular writers, Hills and Green, were brought in to deal with the scripts. Meanwhile, Cotton recruited John Ammonds to serve as the new show's producer. Ammonds was an experienced producer/director of light entertainment on the BBC, and had worked with Morecambe and Wise on their radio series, You're Only Young Once in the 1950s.

The first episode of The Morecambe & Wise Show was broadcast on BBC2 on 2 September 1968 and, initially, showed little difference from their previous series on ITV. Bill Cotton's plan was to allow Morecambe and Wise to become comfortable with their new surroundings before implementing his plan to extend the show by an additional twenty minutes per episode. By the conclusion of the first series, on 21 October, there was a degree of satisfaction with the finished product, and a welcome anticipation for the next series. But, on 7 November, just over two weeks after the transmission of the final episode, Eric Morecambe had a serious heart attack while returning to his hotel following a show at the Batley Variety Club. This immediately put any thoughts of a new series on hold; while Bill Cotton said that the BBC would fully honour the contract that they had signed with Morecambe and Wise, with the only proviso that Morecambe take as long as required to fully regain his strength, Hills and Green were less sure that Morecambe would be able to return. While Wise was flying to Barbados for a short holiday, he was stunned to hear from one of the cabin crew that the writing pair had elected to end their association with Morecambe and Wise and return to ATV.

The loss of Hills and Green could have ended up being a terminal problem for the duo, but Bill Cotton then suggested that the duo talk to Eddie Braben, who had recently stopped working with Ken Dodd. Although Braben was a very different writer to Hills and Green, with the three all vaguely unsure that any collaboration would work, after a meeting between them and Bill Cotton, the writer submitted first a sample piece for the duo, before writing a full 45-minute script. In his interpretation, he moved away from how Morecambe and Wise had been presented by Hills and Green, instead creating characters that he perceived as exaggerated versions of their own personas as he had observed them.

The second series eventually began in July 1969 and, unlike the previous one, consisted of just four episodes. The opening of the first episode, which would feature the duo in front of the tabs, was particularly memorable as, after Morecambe and Wise came forward, Morecambe pulled open his jacket and told his heart to "keep going you fool".

A tradition that had begun with Two of a Kind was the invitation to special guests and the subsequent "insulting" of them, and this was stepped up a gear with the BBC shows. The horror film actor Peter Cushing was one of the first to be so treated, beginning the long-running in-joke that he had never been paid. The shows became more structured, with an opening "spot" in front of the curtains in a mock-theatre set-up that they insisted upon having, guest singers and groups, a sketch with the two in their flat, either in the lounge or in bed together, a lavish play "wot Ern wrote" and the final theme song, over the credits.

Over the following years, the success of the show increased, particularly in regard to the Christmas special. The first of these was broadcast in 1969 and, as time went on, proved to be a source of concern in ensuring that each successive show topped the last; indeed, in some years, there would be no series so that the full attention of writer, producer and stars could be focused on the Christmas show. By 1977, Morecambe and Wise were the most important parts of the BBC's entertainment schedule. That year, they had again not done a series to focus on the Christmas show, which ended up gaining just over 28 million viewers. However, just over a month later, in January 1978, an announcement was made that the duo had elected to leave the BBC, having signed a contract with Thames Television.

Following their departure, and in an effort to win viewers away from the commercial network, BBC1 broadcast a compilation programme, titled The Best of Morecambe & Wise, on Christmas Night in 1978, in direct competition to the duo's new show which was being shown at the same time on Thames Television. Prior to its broadcast, the BBC had publicised the programme heavily as being "the very best of" Morecambe and Wise, and described Morecambe and Wise as being "at their peak". Their departure from the BBC had been greatly publicised and allegiances were tested to their limits, with the general public feeling very much in "ownership" of the partnership who had entertained them every Christmas Night since 1969. The programme was made up of highlights from their 1976 and record-breaking 1977 Christmas shows. It has since been repeated under the title of Morecambe & Wise at the BBC for subsequent broadcasts.

== The Christmas Shows ==
Morecambe and Wise's Christmas shows were always broadcast at peak time on Christmas Day, these broadcasts provided some of the most memorable moments in the series. For example, Grieg's Piano Concerto with André Previn, Smoke Gets in Your Eyes with Shirley Bassey and Glenda Jackson's medley of Hollywood tunes all came from the same Christmas Show in 1971.

In a 1976 show, newsreader Angela Rippon revealed her legs and performed a dance routine with her hosts. This (along with the 1972 special) was the only Christmas show of the BBC years not to be written by Eddie Braben, when writing duties transferred to John Junkin and Barry Cryer, among others.

The 1977 special included a version of "There Is Nothing Like a Dame", performed by a chorus line of male BBC presenters, including Barry Norman, Michael Aspel and Peter Woods. It saw the ratings reach more than 28 million viewers, making it one of the 25 all-time most watched programmes on British television, as of April 2012.

There was no Christmas Show in 1974, when Mike Yarwood filled the peak time slot. Instead, a special edition of Michael Parkinson's show was aired late at night in which he interviewed Eric and Ernie, interspersed with clips of their previous shows.

== Theme tunes ==
By far, the most fondly remembered of the duo's signature tunes was "Bring Me Sunshine" which was written by Arthur Kent, but it was not the only tune the pair used. The other songs used were "Positive Thinking", "We Get Along So Easily (Don't You Agree?)", "Following You Around" and "Just Around The Corner".

"Bring Me Sunshine" was used as the title of the tribute show at the London Palladium after Eric Morecambe's death. The BBC made several compilation programmes and "best of" editions in recent years and favoured "Bring Me Sunshine" as the most popular song they used. As a result, it is more consciously associated with them than the other tunes.

== Running gags and in-jokes ==
=== "The lady who comes down at the end" ===
There were several items that overran into other shows and series; the first was the "lady who comes down at the end" (Janet Webb) who, despite having no involvement in the 50-minute programme would stride onto the stage at the very end of the show (after all the guest stars had taken their curtain-call) and take a bow. In later series, this was accompanied by her following speech: "I'd like to thank all of you for watching me and my little show here tonight; if you've enjoyed it, then it's all been worthwhile. So, until we meet again, goodbye – and I love you all!" after which she would be showered with gifts of champagne, boxes of chocolates, etc. On one of her first appearances, Ernie pours her a glass of champagne for some reason. Her presence was never explained on the programme. In one episode, she "marries" Arthur Lowe who claims he only agreed to appear on the understanding he could meet her. She does also appear in one of Ern's plays with Robert Morley as "Tutantessie", a clear reference to comedian Tessie O'Shea who went by the name "Two-Ton Tessie".

They officially end her appearance by having Eric and Ernie supposedly pulling out the tape of the end of the show and taking a bow, then the camera zooms out to show that they've pulled out all the reels of tape either by accident or on perpouse, then they look at each other wondering how they'll put all the reels back in. Then the camera fades to black, and that was the end of Janet Webb on Morecambe & Wise.

=== "He's Frankie Vaughan's son" ===
The recurring character, originally billed as Frankie Vaughan's son, appeared regularly in the earlier series and was played by Rex Rashley who also appeared variously as "John Wayne" and "Bob Pope" in a sketch which involves Little Ern thinking he's going to be Bob Hope's script writer, only for the ageing figure of Rashley to appear through the drapes. Again, he also appeared in several of the plays at the end of each show, as a sailor in "Monty on the Bonty", and variously as a butler, etc., in other shows and hilariously as Robin Hood in one episode from the third series.

=== Des, short for Desperate ===
The first few series saw singer Frankie Vaughan as the butt of all jokes (on one memorable occasion a decrepit be-suited character shuffled on stage only to be announced as "Frankie Vaughan's Son") and the singer began to take exception to being treated in this way and had a lawyer's letter drawn up addressed to the BBC (Vaughan however soon made up his differences with the duo, and made a guest appearance in their final BBC series, made in 1976). The answer to this turned out to be very simple; the premise of the joke was simply transferred over to Morecambe's friend Des O'Connor who memorably was the butt of many unkind jokes for several years, culminating in his appearance on both the 1975 and 1976 Christmas Specials to much acclaim. O'Connor did, however, have an excellent relationship with the pair (suggesting some of the put-downs), and delivered the tribute to Eric Morecambe at the 1984 Bring Me Sunshine tribute concert in aid of the British Heart Foundation, which took place at the London Palladium after Eric's death.

=== "Not now, Arthur" ===
The veteran harmonica player Arthur Tolcher, an old friend of Morecambe and Wise from their earliest days in variety, effectively replaced the Janet Webb role in later series, by appearing when least expected or needed and bursting into the first few bars of a harmonica tune fully dressed in concert attire with white tie and tails; he would usually appear after the titles had rolled, the credits had appeared on-screen and the snatch of a bar would be heard before the screen faded to black. He also enjoyed some bit parts in plays but was never permitted to perform his entire act on the show. He appeared (in this guise) at the Bring Me Sunshine tribute to Eric Morecambe after a break of several years not having been associated with the duo.

== Archive status ==
The early years of The Morecambe & Wise Show, like many BBC programmes of the time, were not fully archived at the time of recording.

The entirety of The Morecambe & Wise Show from Series 2 onwards is now preserved in the BBC's archives. For a long time the episode classed as Series 4 (6) that was broadcast on BBC1 on 8 October 1970 was missing from the archive, with only audio recordings existing. However, in 2020, while searching through his father's papers, Gary Morecambe discovered a previously unknown film copy of the episode. The episode's picture and soundtrack were also restored, and went through a colour recovery process by the BBC. The episode aired on 25 December 2021.

For many years most of Series 1, the only BBC series written by Hills and Green, was missing. A total of 20 minutes of footage from the sixth episode of Series 1 was included on the DVD release of Series 2. This was purchased by a film collector named Tim Disney and subsequently returned to the BBC archive to allow a copy to be made. This copy was a telerecording that had been produced for sale overseas, which had some edits from the original BBC broadcast version.

In 2011, professional film researcher Philip Morris, on an expedition on behalf of the BBC to find missing BBC programmes, encountered a film store in the Nigerian city of Jos. In this, he discovered previously missing episodes of a number of programmes, including episode 2 from the first series of The Morecambe & Wise Show. This copy, however, was in critically poor condition owing to severe decay of the film stock, and was unable to be used. However, new techniques developed in conjunction with the BBC's archives have seen the footage from this film begin to be restored in 2017.

On 5 October 2018, Morris announced on The One Show the recovery of 16mm black and white telerecordings of episodes 5 and 7, from a disused cinema in Sierra Leone. These prints had been kept in good condition and were subsequently restored and converted back to full colour via the colour recovery process, utilising the colour sub-carrier present on the film prints. The restored episodes were aired on BBC Two on 26 December 2018.

A DVD featuring a reconstruction of Series 1, episode 2 and the 4 recently recovered episodes (including the series 4 episode) was released in 2022 with the remaining episodes' soundtracks included, meaning all episodes have now been released in some form.

On 24 April 2026 the BBC announced that Series 1 episode 3 has been recovered by Film is Fabulous from the collection of a private collector.

== Awards and nominations ==
Year	Award	Nominee	Category	Result	Reference
1970	BAFTA TV Awards	Eric Morecambe; Ernie Wise	Best Light Entertainment Personality	Won	
1970	Writer's Guild of Great Britain Awards	Eddie Braben	Best Light Entertainment Script	Won	
1971	BAFTA TV Awards	John Ammonds	Best Light Entertainment Programme	Nominated	
1971	BAFTA TV Awards	Eric Morecambe; Ernie Wise	Best Light Entertainment Performance	Won	
1971	Writer's Guild of Great Britain Awards	Eddie Braben	Best Light Entertainment Script	Won	
1972	Writer's Guild of Great Britain Awards	Eddie Braben	Best Light Entertainment Script	Won	
1973	BAFTA TV Awards	Eric Morecambe; Ernie Wise	Best Light Entertainment Performance	Won	
1974	BAFTA TV Awards	John Ammonds	Best Light Entertainment Programme	Nominated	
1974	BAFTA TV Awards	Eric Morecambe; Ernie Wise	Best Light Entertainment Performance	Won	
1974	Writer's Guild of Great Britain Awards	Eddie Braben	Best Light Entertainment Script	Won	
1977	BAFTA TV Awards	Ernest Maxin	Best Light Entertainment Programme	Nominated	
1978	BAFTA TV Awards	Ernest Maxin	Best Light Entertainment Programme	Won	
1978	BAFTA TV Awards	Penelope Keith (Note: Penelope Keith was jointly nominated for her performance in the 1977 Christmas Show and the sitcom The Good Life)	Best Light Entertainment Performance	Nominated	

== DVD releases ==
In June 2007, 2 Entertain began releasing The Morecambe and Wise Show on DVD in Region 2. The first series of the show was wiped from the BBC archives and only 25 minutes of one episode then survived; this was included on the DVD release of the complete second series on 4 June 2007. The complete third series, including the Golden Rose of Montreux episode, was released on 6 August 2007. The complete set of Christmas Shows was released as a three-disc set on 12 November 2007. The fourth series was released on DVD on 3 April 2008 but does not include the sixth episode of the series, which no longer existed at the time. The fifth series was released on 4 May 2009. The sixth series was released on 3 August 2009. The seventh series was released on 3 May 2010. The eighth series was released on 5 July 2010, and the ninth series was released on 23 August 2010. A complete box-set containing all nine series and eight Christmas specials (not included was the 1974 Michael Parkinson Christmas programme) was released on 4 October 2010. A special HMV exclusive version with updated box art is also available. The series 1 episodes found in Sierra Leone and the series 4 episode found by Gary Morecambe have not yet been released on DVD. The series 1 episodes are rebroadcast annually and are also available to view at the BFI. The recovered episodes and all of the remastered material was released on DVD on 6 June 2022 titled Morecambe & Wise - The Lost Tapes
