= The Eric Morecambe and Ernie Wise Show =

Comedy variety show transmitted on BBC Radio 2 from 1975 to 1978

The Eric Morecambe and Ernie Wise Show is a comedy variety show, transmitted on BBC Radio 2 in four series from 1975 until 1978. It starred Eric Morecambe and Ernie Wise. It was written by Eddie Braben and produced by John Browell. Many sketches were adapted from the BBC TV series with different guest stars. Guest singers appearing on the show included Peters and Lee, Lynsey de Paul and Anita Harris.
