= Edmund Hockridge =

Canadian singer (1919–2009)

- on the cover of Hit Parade E.P. (1956)

Background information
- Born: Edmund James Arthur Hockridge; 9 August 1919; Vancouver, British Columbia, Canada
- Died: 15 March 2009 (aged 89) Peterborough, Cambridgeshire, England
- Genres: Light opera, Easy listening Traditional popular music
- Occupations: Singer, actor
- Instrument: Vocals
- Years active: 1946–1996
- Labels: Decca, His Master's Voice, Parlophone, Pye Nixa

Edmund James Arthur Hockridge (9 August 1919 – 15 March 2009) was a Canadian baritone and actor who had an active performance career in musicals, operas, concerts, plays and on radio. According to his obituary in The Guardian, his life could have provided the storyline for one of the musicals he starred in.

== Career ==
Edmund Hockridge grew up on a farm in the Vancouver area of British Columbia. His mother was a pianist and his father and three brothers - all older than he was - loved to sing. When Edmund was 17, a Vancouver music club organised an audition with New York Metropolitan Opera star John Charles Thomas, who encouraged him to look to music as a career. Going overseas during World War II with the Royal Canadian Air Force led to Hockridge being "loaned" to the BBC, in a unit supplying news and entertainment to the troops in Europe, working with the Glenn Miller Orchestra and the Canadian Band of the Allied Expeditionary Force led by Robert Farnon.

Hockridge learned much of his craft as an entertainer at the radio (mike), singing and producing 400 shows for the BBC Forces Network and, as the war ended, he was snapped up for appearances with the big names in British popular music, Gerald Bright (better known as Geraldo) and George Melachrino among them. Whilst serving in Britain he met a Wren, Eileen Elliott, who worked in Lord Louis Mountbatten's office. They married and had a son, but Hockridge believed that they had fallen into marriage rather than love, and by the time he returned to Canada it was clear that the relationship was doomed.

After the war, he had his own coast-to-coast radio show from Toronto with the Canadian Broadcasting Corporation, in whose Gilbert and Sullivan productions he played all thirteen patter-song roles. He was also developing a career in opera, taking leading roles in Don Giovanni, La Boheme and Peter Grimes. His big break, in 1950, came with the chance to play Billy Bigelow in Rodgers and Hammerstein's Carousel at the Theatre Royal in London's Drury Lane. This marked the beginning of 40 years in showbusiness in the United Kingdom. Carousel was also to change Hockridge's personal life. In the cast was a 19-year-old dancer, Jackie Jefferson. The couple chose to keep their affair low-key, eventually marrying after his first wife agreed to a divorce.

They moved to Peterborough (where they lived next door to Ernie Wise) and brought up a family. In 1951 he went back on British radio, while continuing to do his stage performances. After three years and nearly 1300 performances, he joined the American cast of Guys and Dolls when they brought the show to London, in the role of Sky Masterson.

Hockridge went on to make two more musical roles his own - Judge Forestier, in Can-Can, and Sid Sorokin in the original London production of The Pajama Game, an instant hit with the British public. His hit single, "Hey There", from what quickly became a hit show, ensured that his name became more well-known. Seven years of musicals were followed by public appearances, concerts, pantomimes, Royal Command Performances, London Palladium seasons, summer shows, television dates in the UK, Canada and Europe and some special occasions - topping the bill on the maiden voyage of the QE2 to New York and representing Canada in the choir at the Coronation of Queen Elizabeth II among them. Cabaret bookings took Hockridge to the Stanley Hotel in Nairobi, and the Mandarin Hotel in Hong Kong, and he recorded singles, EPs and eleven albums.

In October 1968, Hockridge appeared on BBC Television's Morecambe & Wise Show.

In 1986, aged 67, he partnered the rock singer Suzi Quatro in a London production of Annie Get Your Gun (his seventh musical) and also appeared with Isla St Clair in a provincial production of The Sound of Music (1984). He continued to perform on stage regularly, latterly with his family, until his retirement.

== Recordings ==
His first recording, "Serenade" (1950) on British Decca Records, was followed by three releases on His Master's Voice, none of which sold well. Then, in 1953, he switched to Parlophone, making recordings of songs from Guys and Dolls, Carousel, and Can-Can. In 1955, he returned to His Master's Voice, while still doing songs from the same musicals that saw him as an actor: in this case, "Hey There" from The Pajama Game. Finally, in 1956, he moved to Pye Nixa, the record label which brought him his first hits.

His second Nixa recording was a cover of Tennessee Ernie Ford's "Sixteen Tons," with a version of Dean Martin's "Young and Foolish" on the flip side. Whilst Ford's version of "Sixteen Tons" outdid Hockridge's, the latter's version of "Young and Foolish" was a Top 10 hit on the UK Singles Chart. Hockridge followed this record with "No Other Love," which was another hit. He had one final entry on the chart with "By the Fountains of Rome" in September 1957.

After this, he continued to record for Pye Nixa, though not charting again in the UK.

== Personal life and death ==
Hockridge died on 15 March 2009, at the age of 89, in Peterborough, Cambridgeshire. He was survived by his widow Jackie, their sons Murray and Stephen, a foster son, Clifford, and Ian, his son from his first marriage to Eileen Elliott.

== Filmography ==
- King's Rhapsody (1955)
