= Ernest Maxin =

British television producer, director, dancer and choreographer (1923–2018)

- Born: 22 August 1923; Upton Park, London, England
- Died: 27 September 2018 (aged 95)
- Spouses: Eileen Johnson; Leigh Madison
- Children: 1

Ernest Maxin (22 August 1923 – 27 September 2018) was a British television producer, director, dancer and choreographer. He is best known for his work in the 1960s and 1970s with Kathy Kirby, Dick Emery, Dave Allen, Les Dawson, and Morecambe and Wise.

== Early life and career ==
Maxin was born Ernest Cohen in Upton Park, East London to Jewish parents, and joined the BBC as a trainee producer in 1952 after working as a professional dancer since his teens. He moved to ABC Weekend TV in 1959, but returned to the BBC in 1964 where he spent the remainder of his television career, specialising in light entertainment producing shows for such performers as Charlie Drake and Dave Allen, and also The Black and White Minstrel Show between 1970 and 1976. He was most notable for taking over from John Ammonds in producing The Morecambe and Wise Show from 1974 until 1977. He won a BAFTA for the 1977 Morecambe and Wise Christmas Show and the Rose d'Or for the Charlie Drake 1812 Overture in 1968. His final series for the BBC was The Les Dawson Show in 1981–1982, before his retirement at the age of 60.

== Recordings ==
Maxin made several light orchestral recordings in the 1960s. These included:

- F#. . .Where There Is Music (Top Rank Records, 1959)
- With My Love (Top Rank, 1960)
- Great Themes from Great Music (Riverside, 1962)
- The Nearness of You (Major Minor, 1968)
- Getting Sentimental (Fontana Records, 1969)

== Personal life ==
His first wife from 1952 was dancer Eileen Johnson, who he later divorced. His second wife was actress Leigh Madison, whom he married in 1960 and had a son, Paul. His second wife died in 2009.

== Death ==
He died on 27 September 2018 at the age of 95, survived by his son and granddaughter.
