= Eddie Braben =

English comedy writer and performer (1930–2013)

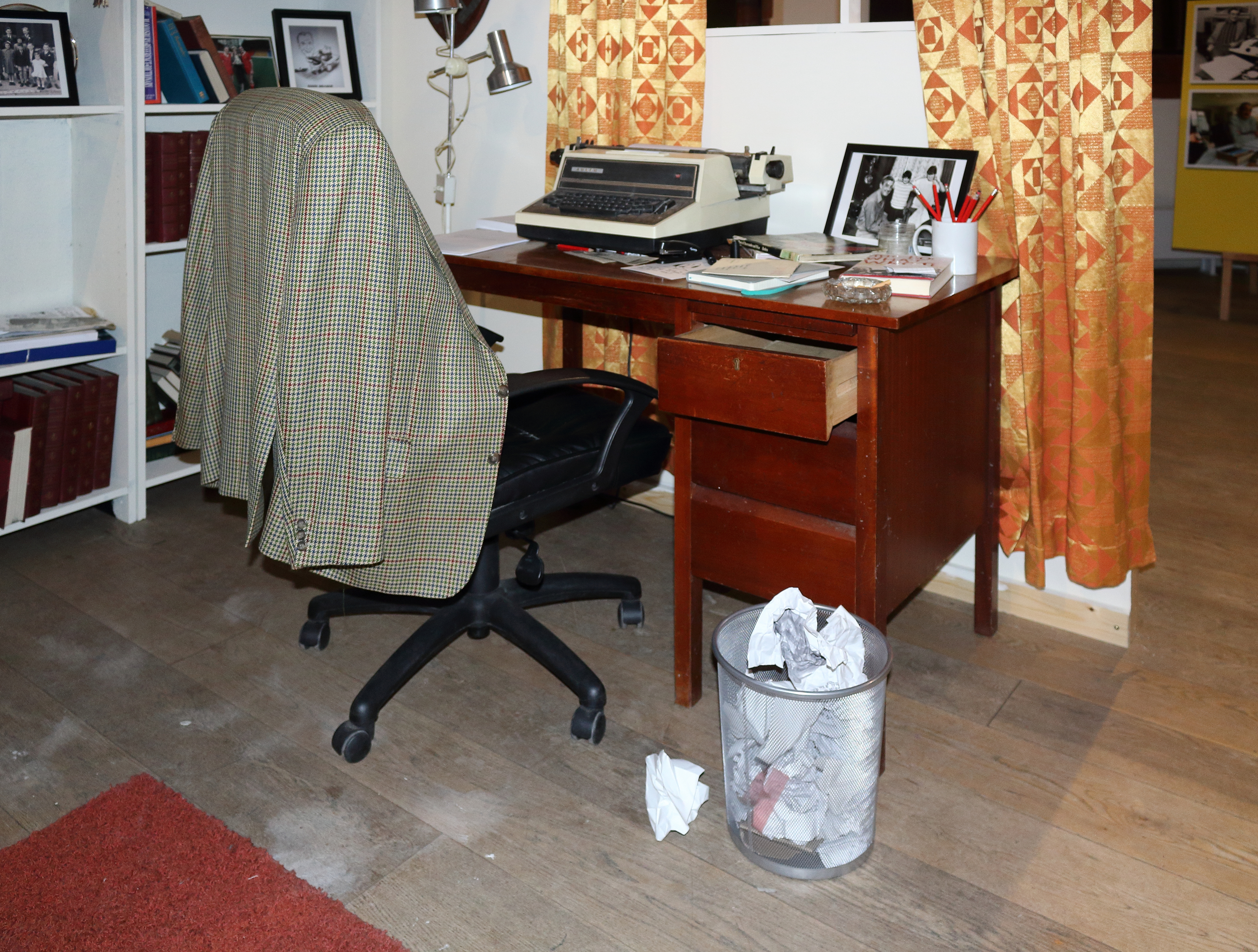
- The desk at which Braben wrote scripts for Morecambe and Wise
- Born: Edwin Charles Braben; 31 October 1930; Dingle, Liverpool, Lancashire, England
- Died: 21 May 2013 (aged 82)
- Occupation: Comedy writer

Edwin Charles Braben (31 October 1930 – 21 May 2013) was an English comedy writer and performer best known for providing material for Morecambe and Wise. He also worked for David Frost, Ronnie Corbett and Ken Dodd.

== Life and career ==
Braben's father was a butcher at St. John's Market, Liverpool, and he was born in Monkswell Street, Dingle. He was evacuated to Anglesey as a child during World War II, and was a fan of radio comedy, particularly Arthur Askey. He left school in 1945 and worked in the British American Tobacco factory before national service in the Royal Air Force, during which he was posted to the kitchen at RAF Kenley. He then worked as a market trader with his own greengrocery stall, writing jokes in his spare time.

Although shy, he sent jokes to various comedians that were appearing in Liverpool. His first was sold to Charlie Chester for 2s 6d (12½p), but his first major success was with Ken Dodd, with whom he worked for 12 years.

Braben's biggest success came when the BBC lured Morecambe and Wise from ITV. Bill Cotton, then in charge of Light Entertainment at the BBC, was looking for a writer following the duo's split from Dick Hills and Sid Green. The first Braben-penned Morecambe & Wise Show was broadcast in July 1969, and he wrote most of their BBC shows after that, including many of the Christmas specials. In 1980, he joined Thames Television to continue writing for the duo following their move back to ITV two years previously.

Braben, along with Morecambe and Wise, won the Society of Film Television Artists 1973 award for Outstanding Contribution to Television. He also won the Best British Light Entertainment Script award from the Writer's Guild of Great Britain in 1969, 1970, 1971 and 1973.

Braben wrote and appeared in various radio comedy shows for the BBC, including The Worst Show on the Wireless (Radio 2; 1973–75) and The Show with Ten Legs (Radio 2; 1976–81). In 2001, Braben collaborated with Hamish McColl and Sean Foley to write The Play What I Wrote, a stage play and tribute to Morecambe and Wise, which opened at the Liverpool Playhouse Theatre before transferring to London's West End. The play won an Olivier Award for Best New Comedy, it later transferred to Broadway and was nominated for a Tony Award for Best Special Theatrical Event. The director was Kenneth Branagh.

Braben had a son, Graham, with his first wife. After her death, he married Deidree, an ex George Mitchell singer/dancer, with whom he had two daughters. He had six grandchildren.

Braben's autobiography, The Book What I Wrote, was published in 2004.

Braben's book, Eddie Braben's Morecambe and Wise Book, was published shortly after his death in 2013.

In December 2017, Eric, Ernie and Me, a docudrama about Braben's work with Morecambe and Wise written by Neil Forsyth starring Stephen Tompkinson as Eddie Braben, was shown on BBC Four.

== Online resources ==
- Eddie Braben at IMDb
- Obituary in 'The Guardian'
- Eddie Braben at British Comedy Guide
