= John Ammonds =

British television producer (1924–2013)

- Born: 21 May 1924; Kennington, London
- Died: 13 February 2013 (aged 88)

John Ammonds, MBE (21 May 1924 – 13 February 2013) was a British television producer of light entertainment programmes.

Ammonds was born in Kennington, London. He produced shows in the 1960s and 1970s for such performers as Val Doonican, Lulu, Frankie Howerd, Marti Caine, Les Dawson, Harry Worth and (in particular) Morecambe and Wise from 1968 to 1974, and later 1980 to 1982.

Ammonds was appointed a Member of the Order of the British Empire in the 1975 New Year Honours List.
