= List of Morecambe and Wise joint appearances =

This is a complete list of Morecambe and Wise's appearances.

== Television ==
=== Original appearances ===
- Running Wild (1954) first television appearance of the double act, not well received
- The Bob Monkhouse Hour (1959) guest appearances only within the variety-based show
- The Ed Sullivan Show (1964) various appearances within the famous programme
- Two of a Kind (1961) their first "own" show, shown on commercial television
- The Morecambe & Wise Show (1968) often called the golden years, with the "beeb"
- The Morecambe & Wise Show (1978) their last shows, for commercial television

=== Other appearances ===
- Atari computer adverts (1982)
- The Sweeney (1978) "Hearts and Minds" episode

=== Compilations ===
- The Best of Morecambe & Wise (1977), rebroadcast as Morecambe & Wise At The BBC
- The Morecambe & Wise Show (Various)
- The Adventures Of Morecambe & Wise (1996)
- I Worked With Morecambe & Wise...And Look What Happened To Me! (1997)
- The Sunshine Boys (1998)
- Morecambe & Wise : Encore! (1995)

=== Tributes and retrospectives ===
- Fools Rush In shown as part of the "Omnibus" documentary series, from their fifth series
- Bring Me Sunshine (1984) tribute in aid of the British Heart Foundation from the London Palladium
- "The Importance Of Being Ernie" (1990) a special programme in the Omnibus strand focussing on Ernie
- Bring Me Sunshine (1994) tribute to Eric Morecambe marking the 10th anniversary of his death
- The Heart & Soul of Eric Morecambe (1998) comprehensive documentary focussing on health issues
- The Unforgettable Eric Morecambe (2 November 2001) compilation and tribute programme with new interviews
- The Unseen Eric Morecambe (2005) documentary compiled using interviews and home movie footage
- Morecambe & Wise: Greatest Moments (2007) countdown show with interviews and new footage of guests
- Morecambe and Wise: In Their Own Words (2007) the story of the duo's struggle for fame using rare clips
- The Show What Paul Merton Did (2008) clip show with studio interviews including writers and family members
- Eric & Ernie (2010) one-off drama following the very earliest years of the duo's journey to success
- Eric & Ernie: Behind The Scenes (2010) charting the careers of the duo and making of the above drama
- The Unforgettable Ernie Wise (26 December 2011) compilation and tribute programme with new interviews
- Bring Me Morecambe & Wise (20 December 2013) retrospective with clips, interviews and unseen footage
- Morecambe & Wise: The Greatest Moment (14 December 2014) clip show featuring a top twenty public-voted sketch rundown
- Morecambe & Wise Forever (20–21 April 2017) archive footage, interviews, clips and reunions of cast and crew members
- Eric, Ernie & Me (22 December 2011) one-off drama showcasing the relationship of the duo's BBC years with Eddie Braben

== Film ==
- The Intelligence Men (1965)
- The Magnificent Two (1966)
- That Riviera Touch (1967)
- The Passionate Pilgrim (1984) (Eric Morecambe only)
- Night Train to Murder (1984)

== Radio ==
- Youth Must Have Its Swing Home Service 4 May – 15 June 1943
- You're Only Young Once Three Series, 1953–1954
- The Show Goes On Light Programme 1955
- The Morecambe & Wise Show Home Service 1955
- Laughter Incorporated Light Programme 1958
- The Morecambe & Wise Show Light Programme 1966
- Morecambe & Wise Sing Flanagan and Allen Radio Two 1971
- Eric & Ernie Play Morecambe & Wise Radio Four 1972
- Eric & Ernie's Hall of Fame Radio Four 1974
- Eric & Ernie's Second Hall of Fame Radio Four 1975
- The Eric Morecambe & Ernie Wise Show three series 1975–1978
- Wise on the Wireless Ernie only, after Eric's death 1987–1988

== Books ==
- Eric & Ernie : The Autobiography Of Morecambe & Wise (1973)
- Morecambe & Wise : There's No Answer To That! (1981)
- Morecambe & Wife (Joan Morecambe) (1987)
- Still On My Way To Hollywood (Ernie Wise) (1991)
- Behind the Sunshine (Gary Morecambe & Martin Sterling) (1993)
- Morecambe & Wise - You Can't See The Join (Jeremy Novick) (1994)
- Life's Not Hollywood, It's Cricklewood (Gary Morecambe) (2004)
- Morecambe & Wise Unseen (William Cook) (2007)
