= Arnaldo Putzu =

Italian artist (1927–2012)

- Born: 6 August 1927; Rome, Italy
- Died: 1 September 2012 (aged 85); Rome, Italy
- Known for: Film posters

Putzu's poster for Get Carter, 1971.

Arnaldo Putzu (6 August 1927 – 1 September 2012) was an Italian artist renowned for his film posters for Italian and British films, such as Get Carter and the Carry On films.

== Biography ==
Born in Rome, the son of an Italian navy officer, he studied art at the Rome Academy. While doing illustration work in Milan, he met the poster artist Enrico de Seta in 1948. De Seta took him to Rome to work in the Italian film industry.

After four years with De Seta, Putzu set up his own studio. He worked for several artists including Augusto Favalli, who then controlled many artists employed by the Cinecittà film studios.

An executive of the Rank Organisation based in Rome was impressed by the poster artwork coming out of Studio Favalli and spotted an opportunity for Rank to have high quality posters for the low wages paid to Italian artists in the postwar era. In collaboration with Eric Pulford, then creative head of Rank's Downton Advertising (who also handled United Artists), Rank began employing Italian artists to work on their film publicity. At first Pulford brought the artwork to the artists in Rome by personally flying between the two cities, but by the late 1950s the artists themselves, such as Renato Fratini, best known for designing the British poster for From Russia with Love were being brought over to live and work in Great Britain.

Putzu began to work for Pulford in the late 1950s. His first British poster was for The Secret Place (1957). He arrived in Britain in 1967 with his first poster in England being for Morecambe and Wise's film The Magnificent Two; he had designed their previous That Riviera Touch in Rome.

He worked on posters in a variety of film genres, such as the Carry On series and Hammer Films including Creatures the World Forgot and The Legend of the 7 Golden Vampires. In his Get Carter posters, he illustrated Michael Caine in a pink tie and floral jacket that he never wore in the film

From 1973 through to 1981 Putzu illustrated the covers of a children's TV magazine called Look-In. Putzu enjoyed the regular work with the magazine that was not too far away from his offices though eventually the magazine covers were replaced by photos.

By the end of the decade, film posters began to be illustrated with cheaper retouched photographs rather than painting. Putzu returned to Rome in October 1985. Suffering from Alzheimer's disease in his early 80s, he found for a while that the symptoms could be alleviated by painting.

== References and sources ==
Sources

- Branaghan, Sim & Chibnall, Stephen British Film Posters ISBN 9781844571482 BFI Publishing, 2/19/2007
