= George Pastell =

Cypriot actor (1923–1976)

- Pastel as Mehemet Bey in The Mummy (1959)
- Born: Georgiou Pastellides; 13 March 1923; Nicosia, Cyprus
- Died: 4 April 1976 (aged 53); Dade County, Florida, U.S.
- Other names: Nino Pastellides; George Pastellides; George Pastel
- Education: Royal Academy of Dramatic Art; National Theatre of Greece
- Occupation: Actor
- Years active: 1949–1976
- Known for: The Mummy; Licensed to Kill; The Tomb of the Cybermen; From Russia with Love
- Spouse: Gloria George (m. 1958)

George Pastell (born Georgiou Pastellides; 13 March 1923 – 4 April 1976) was a Cypriot actor, known for playing various character roles in British films and television during the 1950s and 1960s.

== Early life and education ==
Born to a French mother of Indian origin and a Greek merchant father, Pastell began his career spending two years in banking. His mother hoped for him to become a doctor but he had ambitions from a young age to become an actor after starting an amateur drama group in his hometown. Aged 21, he joined the Greek National Theatre. Leaving Cyprus a few years later with only £50 in his pocket, Pastell came to England, scarcely able to speak much English. However, he studied the language by taking evening classes at the Pitman School and soon graduated from the Royal Academy of Dramatic Art.

== Acting career ==
He made his film debut in Give Us This Day (1949), credited as Nino Pastellides, and played villains in film and television. He was often cast by Hammer Film Productions as Eastern characters such as Mehemet Bey in The Mummy (1959), the High Priest of Kali in The Stranglers of Bombay (1960), Inspector Etienne in Maniac (1963), and Hashmi Bey in The Curse of the Mummy's Tomb (1964).

His exotic looks often saw him cast in spy films of the '60s such as From Russia with Love (1963); Licensed to Kill (1965); A Man Could Get Killed (1966); That Riviera Touch (1966); and Deadlier Than the Male (1967). He also appeared in the films Tiger Bay, The Angry Hills (1959), The Siege of Sidney Street (1960), Konga, The Frightened City (1961), On the Beat (1962), The Moon-Spinners (1964), The Long Duel (1967) and The Magus (1968).

He also appeared as the villain in the '60s television series Danger Man, The Avengers (1966 episode "Honey for the Prince"), Doctor Who, The Champions, The Saint and Department S.

Pastell's stage acting credits included the King of Siam in the musical The King and I, first as a replacement for Herbert Lom on the original West End production, and then in the UK national tour (1956-57). He starred as Wang Chi Yang in the 1960-62 West End run of Flower Drum Song.

== Other work ==
At the suggestion of his wife, backing singer Gloria George (of The Ladybirds), Pastell went into the recording business. In 1968 with his partner Alexander Dembeniotis and help from a couple of bankers, the Duboff Brothers, he took over Recorded Sound Studio to make it a more commercially viable studio. The place would go on to house consoles and equipment created by electronics engineer Rupert Neve. Pastell acted as studio manager and by 1971, the studio was renamed Nova Sound after being acquired by a group named Scotia Investments.

== Personal life ==
Pastell married singer Gloria George in 1958. In the latter years of his life, the couple moved to the United States, with residences in Miami and Manhattan.

=== Death ===
He died in Miami on 4 April 1976 from a heart attack.

== Selected filmography ==
Year	Title	Role	Notes
1949	Adam and Evelyne	Headwaiter	Uncredited
1949	Madness of the Heart	Waiter	
1949	Give Us This Day	Lucy	
1952	Moulin Rouge	Man at First Bar	Uncredited
1952	The Gambler and the Lady	Jacko Spina	
1953	Deadly Nightshade	Ferrari	Uncredited
1953	South of Algiers	Hassan	
1958	Blind Spot	Schrieder	
1958	Battle of the V-1	Eryk	
1959	Tiger Bay	'POLOMA' Captain	
1959	Deadly Record	Angelo	
1959	The Angry Hills	Papa Panos	
1959	The Mummy	Mehemet Bey	
1959	The Stranglers of Bombay	High Priest of Kali	
1960	Bottoms Up	Swarthy Man	
1960	The Siege of Sidney Street	Brodsky	
1961	Konga	Prof. Tagore	
1961	The Frightened City	Sanchetti	
1962	Village of Daughters	Second Pickpocket	
1962	Masters of Venus	Kallas	
1962	On the Beat	Manzini	
1963	Tarzan's Three Challenges	Khan (voice)	Uncredited
1963	Impact	Sebastian 'The Duke' Dukelow	
1963	Maniac	Inspector Etienne	
1963	From Russia with Love	Train Conductor	
1964	The Moon-Spinners	Police lieutenant	
1964	The Curse of the Mummy's Tomb	Hashmmi Bey	
1965	The High Bright Sun	Prinos	
1965	The Intelligence Men	Assassin	Uncredited
1965	She	Haumeid (voice)	Uncredited
1965	Licensed to Kill	Second Russian Commisar	
1966	A Man Could Get Killed	Lazlo	
1966	That Riviera Touch	Ali	
1966	Khartoum	Giriagis Bey	Uncredited
1967	Deadlier Than the Male	Carloggio	
1967	The Long Duel	Ram Chand	
1968	The Magus	Marco Ponti	

== Television ==
Year	Title	Role	Notes
1957	Rheingold Theatre	Uniformed Man in Street (uncredited)	Episode: "The Trouble with Destiny"
1959	The Invisible Man	Guard (uncredited)	Episode: "Man in Power"
1959-1960	Interpol Calling	Captain Pagano	4 episodes
1959-1960	The Four Just Men	Various	3 episodes
1959–1965	The Third Man	Prokrian/Parker	3 episodes
1960	International Detective	Baron Constantine	Episode: "The Bristol Case"
1960	BBC Sunday-Night Play	Mexican Priest	Episode: "Playhouse 90: A Town Has Turned to Dust"
1960	Man from Interpol	Kubetz/Vic	2 episodes
1961	The Cheaters	Leon	Episode: "Murder Fugue"
1961–1963	Ghost Squad	Various	3 episodes
1962	Richard the Lionheart	Gamal	Episode: "The Conjurer"
1962	Man of the World	Sebastian	Episode: "Masquerade in Spain"
1962	Zero One	Masra	Episode: "Glidepath"
1962	Maigret	Bellini	Episode: "The Amateurs"
1962–1965	Z-Cars	Mr. Tovarini/Bob Bowler	2 episodes
1962–1969	The Saint	Various	6 episodes
1963	Taxi!	George Vlachos	Episode: "Barricades in Bailey Street"
1963	The Sentimental Agent	Dali	Episode: "A Box of Tricks"
1963–1964	No Hiding Place	Zunderman/Also Russi	2 episodes
1964	It's Dark Outside	Dimitrades	Episode: "One Man's Right"
1964	Espionage	Russian Captain	Episode: "Some Other Kind of Word"
1964	Danger Man	Petel	Episode: "The Colonel's Daughter"
1965	The Sullavan Brothers	Hari Badpur	Episode: "The Men on the Dolman Islands"
1965	Out of the Unknown	Major Khan	Episode: "No Place Like Earth"
1966	The Avengers	Arkadi	Episode: "Honey for the Prince"
1966	BBC Play of the Month	Pakhomev	Episode: "Defection! The Case of Colonel Pretov"
1966	Softly, Softly	Norazio	Episode: "The Jackpot"
1967	The Troubleshooters	Dr. Qadir	Episode: "My Daughter Knows Her Way Around"
1967	Doctor Who	Eric Klieg	Serial: "The Tomb of the Cybermen"
1968	The Champions	Col. Santos	Episode: "Operation Deep-Freeze"
1969	Department S	Sarrat/Camilo Garria	2 episodes

== Stage credits ==
Year	Title	Role	Notes
1953	The Shrike	John Ankoritis	UK Tour
1953–1956	The King and I	King of Siam (replacement)	Theatre Royal, Drury Lane, London
1956–1957	The King and I	King of Siam	UK Tour
1961	Flower Drum Song	Wang Chi Yang	Palace Theatre, London
