= Dick Hills and Sid Green =

British comedy writers

Richard Michael Hills (17 January 1926 – 6 June 1996) and Sidney Green (24 January 1928 – 15 March 1999), informally known as Sid Green and Dick Hills, were a British partnership of television comedy writers, at their highest profile during the 1960s.

They both attended Haberdashers' Aske's Hatcham Boys Grammar School in south-east London. They were both school captains, Hills in 1943 and Green in 1945. Richard returned to the school as a teacher of English, Latin and French. They co-wrote a number of radio scripts whilst Hills was still employed there, and then became writers for Dave King's radio show and then of Dave King's TV show. In the early days not having an office, they wrote together for hours in the Lyons Tea Rooms in Forest Hill SE London where the staff kept them supplied with drink and food for which they paid at the end of the day.

Hills and Green created (with star Anthony Newley) and wrote the six-part surreal comedy series The Strange World of Gurney Slade (1960). In 1961 they wrote the ITV sitcom Winning Widows for Peggy Mount. The partnership also wrote for such performers as Roy Castle and Frankie Howerd, but their best-remembered collaboration was with the comedy double act Eric Morecambe and Ernie Wise on the ATV show Two of a Kind (1962–66), and the comedians' first colour BBC series in 1968. Hills and Green also played supporting roles in various sketches in the series.

Hills and Green were involved in the writing of the three cinema films made by Morecambe and Wise in the 1960s: The Intelligence Men (1965) (in which they also had cameo roles), That Riviera Touch (1966), and The Magnificent Two (1967). After nearly 10 years writing for Morecambe and Wise, Green and Hills signed an exclusive contract writing for ATV around 1968, and their professional relationship with Morecambe and Wise ended. After their two-year contract ended, the two writers attempted to try to break into the US TV market with Green and Hills writing for Johnny Carson. Green alone wrote for The Don Knotts Show (1970–71) in Los Angeles, although Don Knotts did not initially use any of Green's material. Green and Hills also wrote and starred in their own show, Those Two Fellers (1967) for the ITV contractor ABC.

In the US, Green and Hills wrote for a number of American comedians, including the Flip Wilson show, for which they were nominated for an Emmy Award. When Hills' son Mark became eligible for the US draft in the 1970s, Hills moved his family back to Britain and the men's partnership broke up. Green remained in the US writing for Johnny Carson, Bill Cosby and others, but still contributed to British television. Hills presented 44 episodes of the Southern Television celebrity anecdote show Tell Me Another (1976–79). Green created the sitcom Mixed Blessings (1978–80) and wrote some episodes of it. Hills continued to write for light entertainment shows in the UK during the 1980s.

During the early eighties they wrote for the British double act Cannon and Ball, occasionally recycling material that had been used for Morecambe and Wise in the sixties.
