= Morecambe & Wise: There's No Answer to That! =

1981 book by Eric Morecambe and Ernie Wise

- Author: Eric Morecambe; Ernie Wise
- Language: English
- Genre: Non-fiction
- Publication date: 1981
- Publication place: United Kingdom
- Preceded by: Eric & Ernie : The Autobiography Of Morecambe & Wise

Morecambe & Wise: There's No Answer to That! is the second book by Eric Morecambe and Ernie Wise and was published in 1981 as a follow-up to the earlier book, Eric & Ernie : The Autobiography Of Morecambe & Wise, which had been released in 1973 in paperback form. This second volume was available in both hard and soft back.
