= The Intelligence Men =

1965 British comedy film by Robert Asher

- Theatrical release poster
- Directed by: Robert Asher
- Written by: Dick Hills and Sid Green; Peter Blackmore
- Produced by: Hugh Stewart
- Starring: Eric Morecambe; Ernie Wise; William Franklyn; April Olrich
- Cinematography: Jack Asher
- Edited by: Gerry Hambling
- Music by: Philip Green
- Distributed by: Rank Organisation
- Release date: 25 March 1965 (London)
- Running time: 104 minutes
- Country: United Kingdom
- Language: English

The Intelligence Men (U.S. title: Spylarks) is a 1965 British comedy film directed by Robert Asher and starring Eric Morecambe and Ernie Wise. It is subtitled "M.I.5 plus 2 equals 0". It was written by Dick Hills and Sid Green and Peter Blackmore.

Morecambe and Wise made two further films, That Riviera Touch (1966) and The Magnificent Two (1967).

== Plot ==
Eric, in his London coffee bar, is happily serving black coffee to a sinister-looking man when the man tries to persuade him to remember a tune. Unfortunately, Eric is tone-deaf. Ernie Sage enters the coffee bar and Eric tries to get him to identify the tune, without much success. Eventually, Sage realises that this could be something to do with a forthcoming visit by a Russian trade delegation and an assassination attempt by an organisation known as "SCHLECHT" (a parody of SPECTRE from the James Bond films; the word is German for "bad" or "evil", although there is little evidence of German involvement to sabotage this mission).

He reports this to his superiors in Military Intelligence (although he is little more than an office-boy), and they reluctantly agree that only Eric, having heard the tune, will be able to lead them to the centre of the plot. Eric is persuaded to pose as a British agent – the recently deceased Major Cavendish – who had managed to infiltrate SCHLECHT. After a few set-piece comedy interludes, the tune is identified and the plot switches to a performance of Swan Lake at the projected venue for the assassination, where the star Russian ballerina Madame Petrovna is in grave danger.

This section provides some of the funniest moments of the film: for example, Eric, masquerading as a Russian, adopts a broad Scottish highland accent; and during the ballet performance itself, Eric and Ernie, dressed in Egyptian costumes, get mixed up in the "Dance of the Little Swans". Finally, however, the villain is unmasked and all ends happily.

== Cast ==
- Eric Morecambe as Eric
- Ernie Wise as Ernie Sage
- William Franklyn as Colonel Grant
- April Olrich as Madame Petrovna
- Gloria Paul as Gina Carlotti
- Richard Vernon as Sir Edward Seabrook
- David Lodge as stage manager
- Jacqueline Jones as Karin
- Terence Alexander as Reed
- Francis Matthews as Thomas
- Warren Mitchell as Prozoroff
- Peter Bull as Philippe
- Tutte Lemkow as seedy SCHLECHT agent
- Brian Oulton as laundry basket man
- Michael Peake as sinister stranger
- Bob Todd as Policeman outside Military Intelligence building (uncredited)

== Production ==
Filming started October 1964 and took place at Pinewood.

It was the last of several collaborations between producer Hugh Stewart and Asher. Stewart says this was because he fired Asher's brother Jack, the cameraman, who Stewart thought was too slow.

== Release ==
The film opened at the Odeon Leicester Square in London on 25 March 1965.

== Reception ==
=== Critical ===
The Monthly Film Bulletin wrote: "This exceptionally unfunny comedy makes it very hard to understand what, on any level, has contributed to the popularity of Morecambe and Wise. A formal dinner party scene, not by any means devoid of farcical possibilities, is so appallingly mishandled by the director that it emerges as an almost classic example of how not to amuse while apparently trying."

Kine Weekly wrote: "It's a funny film, Very good comedy attraction for all classes."

The Radio Times Guide to Films gave the film 2/5 stars, writing: "Eric Morecambe and Ernie Wise found the transition from TV celebrities to film stars a difficult one to make. They were not helped by the fact that, for their big-screen debut, Sid Green and Dick Hills (scriptwriters of their ITV series at the time) failed to marry the familiar Eric and Ernie characteristics that kept audiences in stitches week after week with the demands of what is, in all honesty, a fitfully entertaining spy spoof."

Critic Leslie Halliwell awarded the film no stars, describing it as an "inept and rather embarrassing big-screen debut for two excellent television comedians".

=== Box office ===
The film was one of the 12 most popular movies at the British box office in 1965. According to Stewart the film was not a success in America, but it made a profit, and led to two more Morecombe and Wise films.
