= That Riviera Touch =

1966 British comedy film by Cliff Owen

- Promotional film poster by Arnaldo Putzu
- Directed by: Cliff Owen
- Written by: Peter Blackmore; Dick Hills and Sid Green
- Produced by: Hugh Stewart
- Starring: Eric Morecambe; Ernie Wise; Suzanne Lloyd
- Cinematography: Jack Asher
- Edited by: Gerry Hambling
- Music by: Ron Goodwin
- Distributed by: Rank
- Release dates: 24 March 1966 (London, West End)
- Running time: 98 minutes
- Language: English

That Riviera Touch is a 1966 British comedy film directed by Cliff Owen and starring Eric Morecambe and Ernie Wise. It was written by Peter Blackmore and Dick Hills and Sid Green. It is the second feature-length film made by the comedy duo Morecambe and Wise.

== Plot ==
After Eric Simpson nearly gives The Queen a parking ticket in London, he and Ernest Clark decide to take a holiday in the south of France. However, when they arrive there, they become unwittingly involved in a jewel theft when the thief Le Pirate decides to use them to smuggle some precious jewels out of the country. He sends the two Britons to a sinister villa and sends the beautiful Claudette, a member of his criminal gang, to keep Eric and Ernie occupied while he carries out the various stages of his plan. Confusion ensues however, as the two battle for the affections of Claudette and Eric accidentally wins a large sum of money at a casino. Eventually Eric and Ernie start to get suspicious and begin to investigate...

== Cast ==
- Eric Morecambe as Eric Simpson
- Ernie Wise as Ernest Clark
- Suzanne Lloyd as Claudette
- Paul Stassino as Le Pirate
- Armand Mestral as Inspector Duval
- Gerald Lawson as Coco
- George Eugeniou as Marcel
- George Pastell as Ali
- Alexandra Bastedo as girl at roulette table
- Nicole Shelby as woman in casino
- Peter Jeffrey as Mauron
- Francis Matthews as hotel manager
- Michael Forrest as Pierre
- Paul Danquah as Hassim

== Production ==
It was announced as Love on the Riviera with James Robertson Justice and Leslie Phillips. It was turned into a vehicle for Morecambe and Wise who had just made their film debut with The Intelligence Men (1965).

Filming started October 1965 on location in the riviera.

== Release ==
The film opened at the Leicester Square Theatre in the West End of London on 24 March 1966.

== Reception ==
=== Critical ===
The Monthly Film Bulletin wrote: "Diamond-sharp photography by Otto Heller, an appealing performance by Suzanne Lloyd, and an excellent little character sketch by George Eugeniou as a bizarre gang-member. Otherwise this is a dismal affair of antediluvian comic routines – strictly for hardened Morecambe and Wise fans."

The Radio Times Guide to Films gave the film 2/5 stars, writing: "Morecambe and Wise head for the south of France in what starts out looking like a customised remake of the old Laurel and Hardy comedy Saps at Sea. But Eric and Ernie's regular writers, Sid Green and Dick Hills, quickly run into the problem that blighted all three of their movies; the pair's relaxed, intimate style might have been perfect for the sketch format of their TV show, but it was totally wrong for sustaining narratives. Few laughs."

Leslie Halliwell said: "Disappointing star comedy ending in a surfboard chase."

=== Box office ===
That Riviera Touch was among the 15 most popular films at the British box office in 1966. Hugh Stewart says that due to rising costs and the fact the film did not do well in America, however, it barely got its costs back.
