= Madoline Thomas =

British actress (1890–1989)

- Born: 2 January 1890; Abergavenny, Monmouthshire, Wales
- Died: 30 December 1989 (aged 99); Weston-super-Mare, Somerset, England
- Occupation: Actress
- Years active: 1910s–1985

Madoline Thomas (born Madoline Mary Price; 2 January 1890 – 30 December 1989) was a Welsh character actress whose career, beginning in midlife, encompassed stage, film, and television roles.

== Early life ==
Madoline Mary Price was born on 2 January 1890, in Abergavenny in Monmouthshire, Wales. Her father E. J. Price was a draper. She was musical, a singer and pianist, and held an ATCL diploma from Trinity Guildhall as a piano teacher. She sang in church and participated in concerts and theatrical productions as a young woman. "Miss Madoline Price possesses an exceptionally fine voice," noted one report from Abergavenny in 1909, adding "We wish Miss Price every success in her musical career".

== Career ==
Thomas' stage credits beginning in the 1940s included a number of roles with the Royal Shakespeare Company during the 1960s in productions directed by Peter Hall, including The Comedy of Errors, Richard II, Richard III, Henry V and Henry VI, Part 2, supporting David Warner, Roy Dotrice, Ian Holm, and Peggy Ashcroft, among others. In 1977, she played a zither as a "venomous elder" in Tales from the Vienna Woods at the Royal National Theatre. In 1982, aged 92, she played Marina in Michael Bogdanov's production of Uncle Vanya. That year, the Guardian profiled Thomas under the headline "A National Legend."

Thomas appeared in supporting parts in more than a dozen films between 1945 and 1972. Her television credits from the late 1940s into the 1980s included parts in shows such as Dixon of Dock Green, Coronation Street, Angels, "Shoestring " and When the Boat Comes In.

== Personal life ==
Madoline Mary Price married John W. H. "Jack" Thomas in 1917; they had a son. She became a professional actress after her husband died. She broke her hip and died soon afterwards, in Weston-super-Mare, on 30 December 1989, three days before her 100th birthday.

== Filmography ==
- 1945: Painted Boats (also known as The Girl of the Canal)
- 1946: Toad of Toad Hall
- 1949: Blue Scar
- 1949: The Last Days of Dolwyn
- 1950: No Trace
- 1950: Blackout
- 1951: Black Widow
- 1952: Ghost Ship
- 1953: The Square Ring
- 1953: Valley of Song
- 1956: Suspended Alibi
- 1957: Second Fiddle
- 1957: Rogue's Yarn
- 1971: Burke & Hare
- 1972: Something to Hide
