= Cliff Owen =

British film and TV director (1919–1993)

Cliff Owen (22 April 1919 – November 1993) was a British film and TV director. He directed The Wrong Arm of the Law (1963), two of the three mid-1960s Morecambe and Wise films, and the 1972 film version of the BBC sitcom Steptoe and Son.

Owen was born in London. He died in Oxfordshire in November 1993, aged 74.

== Filmography (as assistant director) ==
- Brighton Rock (1947) – 3rd assistant director
- Noose (1947) – 2nd assistant director
- Under Capricorn (1949) – 2nd assistant director
- The Hasty Heart (1949) – 3rd assistant director
- Landfall (1949) – 2nd assistant director
- The Magic Box (1951) – assistant director
- Young Wives' Tale (1951) – 2nd assistant director
- Castle in the Air (1952) – assistant director
- Father's Doing Fine (1952) – assistant director
- The Yellow Balloon (1953) – assistant director
- Valley of Song (1953) – assistant director

== Filmography (as director) ==
- Offbeat a.k.a. The Devil Inside (1961)
- A Prize of Arms (1962)
- The Wrong Arm of the Law (1963)
- That Riviera Touch (1966)
- A Man Could Get Killed a.k.a. Welcome, Mr. Beddoes (1966) – co-director
- The Magnificent Two (1967)
- The Vengeance of She (1968)
- Steptoe and Son (1972)
- Ooh... You Are Awful a.k.a. Get Charlie Tully (1972)
- No Sex Please, We're British (1973)
- Closed Up-Tight (1975)
- The Bawdy Adventures of Tom Jones (1976)

== Television (as director) ==
- London Playhouse, "Fighting Chance" (1955)
- Hand In Glove (1955) (TV movie)
- As Others See Us (1955)
- The Seventh Dungeon (1955) (TV movie)
- Boyd Q.C., 4 episodes (1956)
- ITV Television Playhouse, 12 episodes (1956–1961)
- The New Adventures of Martin Kane, "The Letter Story" and "The Heiress Story" (1957)
- Shadow Squad, "The Missing Cheese" (1957–59) – producer
- ITV Play of the Week, 9 episodes (1958–61)
- The Third Man, 3 episodes (1959)
- Knight Errant Limited, "Mediterranean Cruise" (1959)
- Drama 61-67, "Drama '62: No Decision" (1962) – also producer
- On Trial, "The Dilke Case" and "Sir Roger Casement" (1960)
- The Victorians, "Still Waters Run Deep" (1963)
- A Little Big Business, Episode 1.1 (1964)
- The Sullavan Brothers, "The Man from New York" (1964)
- Melina Mercouri's Greece (1965) (documentary)
- The Avengers, "Killer" (1968)
- Rogues' Gallery(1968–69)
- ITV Playhouse, "Murder: When Robin Was a Boy" (1969)
- Confession, "Just as the Sun Was Rising" (1970)
- The Adventures of Don Quick, "The Higher the Fewer" (1970)
