= Off-peak =

Off-peak may refer to:

- Off-peak demand, the opposite of peak demand
- Off-peak hours, the opposite of peak hours
- Off-Peak, a 2015 video game
- Off-Peak Return, a type of British railway ticket
