= The Importance of Being Ernie =

1993 British television documentary

The Importance of Being Ernie was a documentary from the 40 Minutes strand of programming on BBC2 and was made in 1993 following the career of the comedian Ernie Wise after the death in 1984 of his comedy partner Eric Morecambe. It charted the current work of the comedian who, since the death of his partner, had made West End appearances in The Mystery of Edwin Drood and concentrated largely on pantomime work. His autobiography, entitled Still On My Way To Hollywood, is referenced throughout the programme. Despite having the full co-operation of the subject, the programme has been criticised for focussing on him in a negative way, portraying a somewhat tragic figure and, in one section, memorably sees him reminiscing with a view of Eric Morecambe from one of their television programmes in the background. Wise is known to have been unhappy with the outcome of the broadcast programme, and it is notable for being his last major televised work prior to his death in 1999 from heart problems.

The title of the programme, an obvious parody of Oscar Wilde's The Importance of Being Earnest, is in itself reminiscent of one of the plays "what he wrote" at the height of the pair's popularity at the BBC in the 1970s.
