= Eric & Ernie: The Autobiography of Morecambe & Wise =

1973 book by Eric Morecambe and Ernie Wise

- Author: Eric Morecambe, Ernie Wise
- Language: English
- Genre: Autobiography
- Publication date: 1973

Eric & Ernie: The Autobiography Of Morecambe & Wise is a 1973 book by British comedians Eric Morecambe and Ernie Wise.

It is generally considered to be the first volume of their autobiography. It had input from both with help from other writers, whilst certain parts of the book took the form of interview segments. It was released in paperback in 1973 and in updated form in 1974. It was followed by Morecambe & Wise: There's No Answer To That! in 1981 which picked up where this volume ended, charting their move to Thames Television and events after their departure from the BBC in 1978.
