= Roses Theatre =

Arts centre in Tewkesbury, England

Coordinates: 51°59′45.5″N 2°9′17.5″W

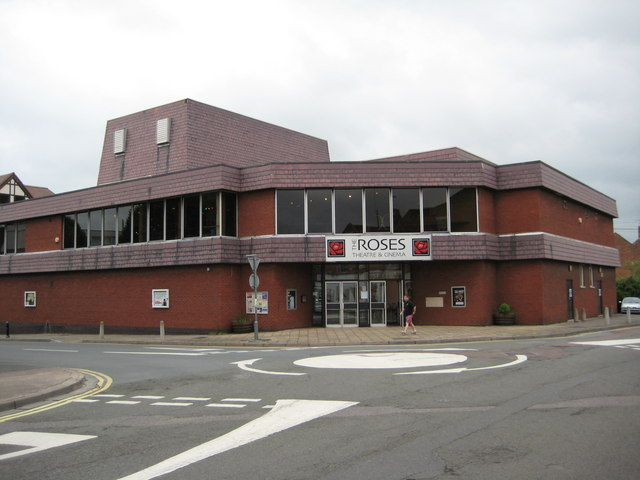
- Type: Theatre and Cinema
- Founded: 1973 (opened 1975)
- Headquarters: Tewkesbury, England, UK
- Products: Live Theatre, Cinema, Community
- Number of employees: 30+
- Website: Roses Theatre

The Roses Theatre is an arts centre located in the centre of Tewkesbury, Gloucestershire, England. Its main auditorium seats 375 and accommodates 35mm film / digital projection as well as live performance. It offers patrons music, theatre, film and dance. The seating layout is based on "the Continental system" avoiding the loss of seats on the axis of the theatre.

== History ==
The Roses Theatre stands on the site of the Sabrina Cinema – an art deco cinema which closed in the 1960s.

Building work started in 1973 and, at that time, Roman remains were unearthed and the project was suspended whilst a full archaeological exploration of the site was conducted. This took some six months and, due to the poor nature of the medieval excavated material, large quantities of ballast were imported. However the project was completed two weeks ahead of a revised schedule in 1975, despite delays occasioned by a national steel shortage. The architects were The Preece Payne Partnership of Gloucester and the primary architect was James Rendell, who was assisted by Roger Payne.

Her Royal Highness Princess Anne attended the opening gala, which took place on 30 October 1975.

The Roses Theatre was run as a council arts centre from 1975 to 1980 by the Courtyard Arts Trust. From 1980 to 1993 the theatre was operated by The Stennett Company, managed by Stan Stennett and his family.

In 1993 the operating lease for the theatre was up for renewal by Tewkesbury Borough Council. A London-based theatre company, the Crummles Theatre Company, was appointed as new operators. The theatre reopened in November 1994 after nearly a year of closure due to maintenance and refurbishment work. The gala reopening event included performances by Ned Sherrin, Michael Palin and Robert Lindsay.

Financial difficulties forced the Crummles Theatre Company into liquidation and the Roses Theatre closed in May 1995.

Following the closure, a group of business owners formed The Roses Theatre Trust with the view to re-open the theatre on a full-time basis as a charitable trust. The theatre re-opened in 1996 and continues to operate as a registered charity today.

In 2015 the front of the theatre underwent a £1m refurbishment which included the complete remodelling of the front of house areas, the introduction of a coffee shop and the installation of a lift to the first floor bar. The refurbishment also included the redecoration of the auditorium, which had not been renovated since the early 1990s.

== Notable events ==
=== Final performance of Eric Morecambe ===
The popular British comedian Eric Morecambe collapsed just off stage at the theatre after taking a final curtain call in May 1984. He never regained consciousness and died shortly afterwards at Cheltenham General Hospital, aged 58.

The theatre remembered the comic legend by naming the theatre's conference room after him. The Eric Morecambe Room is used by local and national companies for conferences and meetings. The theatre has been featured in TV shows documenting his life and featuring photographs of his final performance as well as interviews with Stan Stennett who was a friend of Eric Morecambe. Despite rumours, no video footage is known to exist of Eric Morecambe's final performance.

=== Charlton Heston ===
Actor Nick Wilkes, who was a technician at the theatre in the late 1990s, approached Hollywood actor Charlton Heston to assist with his £2,450-a-term fees at the Bristol Old Vic Theatre School by appearing in a one-night-only show. Mr Heston agreed and the theatre welcomed the Hollywood legend onto its stage for a question-and-answer evening, followed by a cinema screening of his most recent film 'Alaska'.

Following the show, Mr Heston was approached by Theatre Director Robert Hamlin to help launch the theatre's 'replace a seat' campaign which aimed at replacing the auditorium's ageing 375 seats.

=== 1989 Crossroads Roadshow ===
In 1989 the Roses Theatre was transformed into the famous Crossroads Motel as part of the soap's 25th Anniversary.

Stan Stennett, manager of the Roses Theatre from 1980 to 1993, starred in Crossroads during the 1980s.
