= Up in the World =

1956 film by John Paddy Carstairs

- Original British 1-sheet poster
- Directed by: John Paddy Carstairs
- Written by: Jack Davies; Henry Blyth; Peter Blackmore
- Produced by: Earl St. John; Hugh Stewart
- Starring: Norman Wisdom; Maureen Swanson; Edward Chapman; Michael Caridia
- Cinematography: Jack E. Cox
- Edited by: John Shirley
- Music by: Philip Green
- Production company: Rank Organisation
- Distributed by: J. Arthur Rank Film Distributors
- Release date: 24 December 1956
- Running time: 87 minutes
- Country: United Kingdom
- Language: English

Up in the World is a 1956 black and white comedy film directed by John Paddy Carstairs and starring Norman Wisdom, Maureen Swanson and Jerry Desmonde. It was written by Jack Davies, Henty Blyth and Peter Blackmore, and produced by Rank.

== Plot ==
Norman is given a job as a window cleaner at a stately home by the Labour Exchange.

He quickly encounters young Sir Reginald, an obnoxious teenager who has an extremely over-protective mother. Due to Reginald's age, the estate is run by the pompous Major Willoughby.

The whole household must kowtow to Reginald. This is epitomised in an estate football match where everyone understands that Reginald must win but Norman doesn't understand this.

Meanwhile, Norman develops a romance with the maid, Jeannie.

Reginald demands that Norman, working as a window cleaner, takes him to London to see a magic show. He tortures him by tickling his feet with a feather, whilst Norman is trapped in an upstairs window frame, and demands that they go that evening... which means he can't take Jeannie to the dance.

Norman is tricked into breaking the TV and a bogus repair van comes to the house. They have come to kidnap Regi but take Maurice by mistake, as Regi has gone off with Norman.

Norman and Regi go to a show and have dinner together. By coincidence it is owned by the kidnappers. When police arrive the kidnappers pin the blame on Norman. Regi gets a bump on the head and remembers nothing. Norman gets sentenced to 25 years in prison. But, as the one serving the longest sentence he becomes the boss of the group of prisoners. Cleaning prison windows on a long ladder he accidentally escapes.

Heading back to Banderville Hall a series of mishaps ends with him looking like a paratrooper and enters the estate with an army group searching for the escapee. Norman tracks down Jeannie at an ongoing fancy dress party and dresses himself as a harem girl. After a dance with the Major he tries to get Regi to remember him.

Jeannie and Norman fight off guests and army from the gallery. The army starts to use tear gas but Norman bats it back into the party-goers. In the commotion Regi bumps his head and remembers everything.

Norman and Jeannie get married with the Sergeant and his men as wedding guests in morning dress.

== Cast ==
- Norman Wisdom as Norman
- Maureen Swanson as Jeannie Andrews
- Jerry Desmonde as Major Willoughby
- Michael Caridia as Sir Reginald
- Colin Gordon as Fletcher Hethrington
- Ambrosine Phillpotts as Lady Banderville
- Michael Ward as Maurice
- Jill Dixon as Sylvia
- Edwin Styles as conjuror
- Hy Hazell as Yvonne
- William Lucas as Mick Bellman
- Lionel Jeffries as Wilson
- Cyril Chamberlain as Harper
- Michael Brennan as prison warder
- Eddie Leslie as Max
- Bernard Bresslaw as Williams, Norman's cell-mate
- Edward Lexy as Detective Superintendent
- Martin Boddey as Police Inspector

== Production ==
Female lead Maureen Swanson was under contract to Rank at the time.

== Reception ==
=== Box office ===
According to Kinematograph Weekly the film was "in the money" at the British box office in 1957.

=== Critical ===
The Monthly Film Bulletin wrote: "The absurd, neatly-constructed story is a satisfactory comic vehicle, and the comic incident is well integrated to it. Though there are no really outstanding comic scenes, at least there are none of the distressingly unfunny ones which marred Man of the Moment (1955). The comedian still seems unfortunately obsessed by incidents whose fun lies in acute social embarrassment."

Picturegoer wrote: "Watch out below there – Wisdom's back at work. If there's still any doubt that this gump-suited comic isn't top of the ladder of Britain's funny men, this slapstick caper should prove the point once and for all. He must be good to get laughs from a comedy that's as hackneyed, uninventive and homely as this."

Filmink argued the movie is "more cohesive" than other comedies Carstairs directed that year with Ian Carmichael (The Big Money) and Frankie Howerd (Jumping for Joy) "but then Wisdom is a far warmer, empathetic presence on screen than Howerd or Carmichael."

Picture Show wrote: "Norman Wisdom is well on form – hilariously funny at one moment and wistfully sad the next. Excellent support from the rest of the cast."

The Radio Times wrote, "for his fourth starring vehicle, Norman Wisdom teamed up once more with director John Paddy Carstairs. However, this tacky comedy gave notice that the winning formula was already beginning to wear thin ... The worst aspect of this maudlin mishmash is the fact that Wisdom gets to warble so often. No wonder he ends up in prison".

In British Sound Films: The Studio Years 1928–1959 David Quinlan rated the film as "good", writing: "Comedy is uninventive, but Wisdom makes it funny in parts."

TV Guide called the film a "routine British comedy".
