= Michael Caridia =

British former child actor (born 1941)

- Born: 2 August 1941 (age 84); Swaffham, Norfolk, England
- Occupation: Actor
- Years active: 1950s–1960s

Michael Caridia (born 2 August 1941) is a British former child actor.

His prominent roles include Sir Reginald, an obnoxious boy, in the Norman Wisdom film Up in the World and Hugo Wendt in the 1956 horror-comedy The Gamma People. In a 1960 dramatisation of the trial of Oscar Wilde he played Edward Shelley, an alleged rent boy who acted as a prosecution witness. He has not had any film or TV appearances since 1961. In 1970 he married Jennifer North in Maidenhead, Berkshire, England.

== Filmography ==
- Pieces of Eight, 1956 BBC TV children's film, aged 11. "The Reluctant Bride" 1955 Played 'Tony' as a child actor.
