= After the Ball (1957 film) =

British film by Compton Bennett

- trade ad from Kinematograph Weekly
- Directed by: Compton Bennett
- Written by: Peter Blackmore; Hubert Gregg
- Produced by: Peter Rogers
- Starring: Pat Kirkwood; Laurence Harvey; Jerry Stovin
- Cinematography: Jack Asher
- Edited by: Peter Boita
- Music by: Ken Jones (uncredited); Eric Rogers (uncredited)
- Production companies: Romulus Films; Beaconsfield Films
- Distributed by: Independent Film Distributors
- Release date: 13 August 1957
- Running time: 89 minutes
- Country: United Kingdom
- Language: English

After the Ball is a 1957 British biographical film directed by Compton Bennett and starring Pat Kirkwood, Laurence Harvey and Jerry Stovin. It was written by Peter Blackmore and Hubert Gregg. It portrays the life of the stage performer Vesta Tilley.

== Plot ==
Performer Vesta Tilley falls in love with Walter de Frece. During World War One she performs propaganda songs.

== Cast ==
- Pat Kirkwood as Vesta Tilley
- Laurence Harvey as Walter de Frece
- Jerry Stovin as Frank Tanhill
- Jerry Verno as Harry Ball
- Clive Morton as Henry de Frece
- Marjorie Rhodes as Bessie
- Leonard Sachs as Richard Warner
- Ballard Berkeley as Andrews
- June Clyde as Lottie Gibson
- Charles Victor as stagehand
- Tom Gill as manager
- Peter Carlisle as Oscar Hammerstein
- George Margo as Tony Pastor
- Mark Baker as George M. Cohan
- Terry Cooke as Dan Leno Jr
- Barbara Roscoe as Patricia
- Margaret Sawyer as Little Tilley

== The Great Little Tilley ==
Pat Kirkwood had previously performed the life of Tilley on television in a live drama called The Great Little Tilley (1956). This followed upon a dramatisation Kirkwood had done of Marie Lloyd called Our Marie (1955).

The Great Little Tilley was based on a script by Kirkwood's husband Hubert Gregg and co starred Tony Britton. Kirkwood said Gregg "was desperate to find a storyline that had some dramatic conflict." They wound up dramatising an incident where Tilley went to hospital with an allergic reaction. Kirkwood admitted she "found it difficult to get under the skin of the character. I met her elderly dresser but there was no family, as was the case with the Marie Lloyd part. The dresser seemed not to know the real Vesta Tilley, but revealed that towards her end she had suffered from mental instability, a kind of egomania, and had attacked her dresser, trying to strangle her. This was no help to the film story, which was supposed to end on her triumphant retirement, and obviously we could not use the episode in any case, although it was the only dramatic one."

The show was originally meant to air in February 1956 but was cancelled due to a musicians' strike.

The Evening Standard called The Great Little Tilley "a sentimental story of success and wedded bliss". The Daily Telegraph felt the production was "impressive" from "a technical point of view."

== Production ==
Kirkwood was approached to make a film of Tilley's life. She wrote in her memoirs, "I was surprised that the producers had chosen this story rather than the more dramatic and human one of Marie Lloyd, which I much preferred." Kirkwood felt that, "The trouble with the 'Vesta Tilley' story was that there was none! She became a star when she was five and stayed in that position all her life; married Sir Walter de Freece; was never ill and, so far as anyone knew, had no troubles whatsoever."

It was made at Beaconsfield Studios in October 1956 with sets designed by the art director Norman G. Arnold.

"I did my best to find some human quality in the character but ended up disliking her," wrote Kirkwood. She added that during filming she felt the movie "is going to be a 'stinker', and so it would have been without some of the songs and a truly moving scene, thanks to Hubert, when Vesta Tilley retired. We were both glad when the film was finished."

Peter Rogers says the film was made because James Woolf wanted a vehicle for Pat Kirkwood and Laurence Harvey. Rogers said Kirkwood "wasn't easy to work with." The film was part of a slate of six to eight movies costing $2.8 million from producer Peter Rogers which also included Time Lock and The Vicious Circle.

== Reception ==
The film was a financial failure.

=== Critical ===
Variety felt Tilley "led a singularly undramatic life. Hence, it is difficult to see how her screen story can have anything but limited appeal even for oldtimers who recall her with affection... Compton Bennett's direction is plodding and uninspired. But it must be admitted that there is little in this mild pic into which he could get his teeth."

The Monthly Film Bulletin wrote: "The problems of recreating on the screen the life of great artists is a constant one. On the one hand it is impossible to convey directly the quality of their artistic achievement; on the other hand it is difficult, without extravagant fictionalisation, to find much drama in a life so unsensational as that of Vesta Tilley (1864–1952). ...Pat Kirkwood performs Vesta Tilley's songs well and wears male costume with rare success; though she can hardly capture the quality Grein described: "Her face was like a city in illumination". Tame and artless though the film in general is, Pat Kirkwood's performance, the shameless sentimentality, the associations with the great music-hall days and above all, the marvellous old songs carry it along quite well."

Picturegoer wrote: "If Britain must make musicals I'll gladly settle for this kind of Edwardian froth. It's a sugary, sentimental story of music-hall star Vesta Tilley. Very English, very kindly and a little dull. But at least it's not an embarrassing attempt to imitate a Hollywood musical."

Picture Show wrote: "This is a delightfully romantic and colourful music hall film ... It is delightfully and imaginatively directed, convincingly set and is worth seeing."

TV Guide gave the film two out of four stars, and wrote, "(Pat) Kirkwood puts zest into the rousing music-hall numbers that made Tilley an enduring star, but the script trudges on and the wait between musical moments may not be worth the reward. It's incomprehensible how director Compton Bennett and writers Hubert Gregg and Peter Blackmore could have made such a yawn out of such a good true story."

Filmink argued Tilley's "life was not that interesting."

== Notes ==
- Kirkwood, Pat (2000). The time of my life. Charnwood.
