= Emrys Jones (actor) =

English actor (1915–1972)

- Jones in a publicity still for The Life and Adventures of Nicholas Nickleby (1947)
- Born: John Emrys Whittaker Jones; 22 September 1915; Manchester, England
- Died: 10 July 1972 (aged 56); Johannesburg, South Africa
- Occupation: Actor
- Years active: 1937–1972
- Spouses: Pauline Bentley (m. 1946; div. 1963); Anne Ridler (m. 1963)

John Emrys Whittaker Jones (22 September 1915 – 10 July 1972) was an English actor.

== Career ==
After Jones made his stage debut in Donald Wolfit's company in 1937, his film debut came in Powell and Pressburger's One of Our Aircraft Is Missing in 1942, and he began to develop a career in the British cinema of the 1940s. Due to his boyish looks he would often be cast as young innocents in films such as The Wicked Lady (1945), The Rake's Progress (1945), Nicholas Nickleby (1947), and Powell and Pressburger's The Small Back Room (1949).

When Jones was relegated to second features in the 1950s he concentrated on his stage career, maturing into an accomplished character actor in the process. The latter half of his career was mostly spent on television in such programmes as Softly, Softly, Out of the Unknown, Dixon of Dock Green, Doomwatch, Z-Cars, Special Branch, and as 'The Master of the Land of Fiction' in the Doctor Who serial The Mind Robber (1968).

== Personal life ==
Jones was married to actresses Pauline Bentley and Anne Ridler. He died of a heart attack in Johannesburg, South Africa in 1972, where he was in a stage production, playing Winston Churchill.

== Film appearances ==
Year	Title	Role	Notes
1942	One of Our Aircraft Is Missing	Bob Ashley - Radio Operator in B for Bertie	
1943	The Shipbuilders	Young Naval Officer from HMS Milano	
1945	Give Me the Stars	Jack Ross	
1945	The Wicked Lady	Ned Cotterill	
1945	The Rake's Progress	Bateson	Uncredited
1946	Beware of Pity	Lt. Joszi Molnar	
1947	Nicholas Nickleby	Frank Cheeryble	
1947	Holiday Camp	Michael Halliday	
1948	This Was a Woman	Terry Russell	
1949	The Small Back Room	Joe	
1949	Dark Secret	Chris Merryman	
1949	Miss Pilgrim's Progress	Vicar	
1949	Blue Scar	Tom Thomas	
1953	Deadly Nightshade	Matthews / Barlow	
1955	Three Cases of Murder	George	(segment "You Killed Elizabeth")
1956	The Shield of Faith		
1960	The Trials of Oscar Wilde	Robbie Ross	
1961	Ticket to Paradise	Jack Watson	
1962	Serena	Howard Rogers	
1963	On the Run	Frank Stewart	Episode of the Edgar Wallace Mysteries

== Television ==
- 1966 Bat Out of Hell - Walter Bowen - (five episodes)
- 1968 Doctor Who: The Mind Robber - The Master - (five episodes)
- 1971 Paul Temple - Edward Caine - (episode: "The Specialists")

== Selected theatre work ==
- Macbeth (1942) directed by John Gielgud at the Piccadilly Theatre (as Malcolm)
- Flare Path (1942) Original production at the Apollo Theatre, (as Flight Lieutenant Teddy Graham)
- The Hasty Heart (1945) Original production at the Aldwych Theatre (as Lachlen)
- Dial M for Murder (1952) Original West End production at the Westminster Theatre (as Tony Wendice)
- Albertine by Moonlight (1956) at the Westminster Theatre (as Mac)
