= Stan Stennett =

Welsh musician and comedian (1925–2013)

Stan Stennett MBE
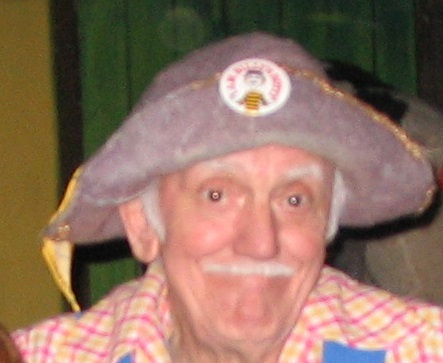
- Stennett in 2008
- Born: Stanley Llewelyn Stennett; 30 July 1925; Pencoed, Bridgend, Wales
- Died: 26 November 2013 (aged 88); Cardiff, Wales
- Occupations: Musician; comedian; actor

Stanley Llewelyn Stennett (30 July 1925 – 26 November 2013) was a Welsh comedian, actor and jazz musician.

== Biography ==
Stennett was born in Pencoed, near Bridgend. During World War II, he served in the army and also worked as an entertainer. He made his professional stage debut with a group called the Harmaniacs. In 1949, he became resident comedian on variety radio show, Welsh Rarebit, and he gained further success as one of the regular Presenters and comedians on The Black and White Minstrel Show.

Although primarily a comedian, who appeared in variety shows and pantomime throughout the UK, Stennett played "straight" acting roles in television programmes such as Coronation Street and Casualty. He was best known as Sid Hooper in the ITV soap opera, Crossroads, before taking a lease in 1980 on the Roses Theatre in Tewkesbury, Gloucestershire.and The New Hereford Theatre.

Stennett was a friend of Eric Morecambe and hosted a charity show at the Roses Theatre in Tewkesbury that was to be Morecambe's final appearance, on 27 May 1984. Shortly afterwards Morecambe died of a heart attack.

Stennett played trumpet and guitar. In his 80s he was still performing onstage.

His autobiography, Fully Booked, was published in 2010.

== Honours ==
Stennett was initiated into the exclusive fraternity, the Grand Order of Water Rats in 1959 and was a Fellow of the Royal Welsh College of Music & Drama.

He was awarded an MBE in the 1979 New Year Honours list, for services to entertainment and to charities.

== Death ==
Stennett died at the University Hospital of Wales, in Cardiff on 26 November 2013, at the age of 88.

He was married to his wife Elizabeth in the late 1940s, and had two sons. Roger Stennett (b 1949) and Ceri Stennett (b 1959).

Roger Stennett is a professional writer working in Theatre, Radio, Animation, Television, Film and Poetry.

Ceri Stennett often appeared on stage with their father, as well as being a Producer, Writer and Radio Presenter
