= Jack Bartholomew =

English rugby league footballer (1888–1965)

Personal information
- Full name: John Bartholomew
- Born: 20 January 1888 Morecambe, England
- Died: 14 July 1965 (aged 77) Bradford district, England

Playing information
- Height: 5 ft 8 3/4 in (175 cm)
- Weight: 11 st 7 lb (73 kg)
- Position: Fullback, Wing, Centre, Stand-off
Club
Years	Team	Pld	T	G	FG	P
≤1906–06	Morecambe
1906–14	Huddersfield	187	41	51	0	225
1914–22	Bradford Northern	122	14	2
	Total	309	55	53	0	225

John Bartholomew (20 January 1888 – 14 July 1965) was an English professional rugby league footballer who played in the 1900s, 1910s and 1920s. He played at representative level for Great Britain (non-Test matches), and at club level for Morecambe, Huddersfield and Bradford Northern as a fullback, wing, centre or stand-off. Jack Bartholomew was the uncle of the comedian Eric Morecambe (real name John Eric Bartholomew).

== Background ==
Bartholomew was born in Morecambe, Lancashire, and his death aged 77 was registered in Bradford district, West Riding of Yorkshire, England.

== Playing career ==
=== Club career ===
Bartholomew played in Huddersfield's 21–0 victory over Batley in the 1909 Yorkshire Cup Final during the 1909–10 season at Headingley, Leeds on Saturday 27 November 1909, the 8–2 defeat by Wakefield Trinity in the 1910 Yorkshire Cup Final during the 1910–11 season at Headingley, Leeds on Saturday 3 December 1910, and the 22–10 victory over Hull Kingston Rovers in the 1911 Yorkshire Cup Final during the 1911–12 season at Belle Vue, Wakefield on Saturday 25 November 1911.

=== International honours ===
Bartholomew was selected for Great Britain while at Huddersfield for the 1910 Great Britain Lions tour of Australia and New Zealand.
