= Rachel Thomas (actress) =

Welsh actress (1905–1995)

Rachel Thomas OBE
- Born: 10 February 1905; Alltwen, Wales
- Died: 8 February 1995 (aged 89); Cardiff, Wales
- Other name: Rachel o'r Allt (bardic name)
- Occupation: Actress
- Awards: OBE (1968); BAFTA Cymru Award (1991)

Rachel Thomas OBE (10 February 1905 – 8 February 1995), was a Welsh character actress.

== Early life ==
Rachel Thomas was born in the Welsh village of Alltwen, near Pontardawe, Glamorgan, the daughter of Emily Thomas. She was raised by her aunt and uncle, Mary Thomas Roberts and David Roberts; her uncle was a tinworker and coal miner.

== Career ==
Thomas taught school as a young woman, competed in eisteddfodau, and was a reader at her church in Cardiff. She came to wider attention when her voice was heard on a BBC radio broadcast in 1933, reading from the Bible. She was cast in the first Welsh-language radio comedy, Y Practis, the following year.

As an actress Thomas worked mainly in Wales, and appeared in such classic films as The Proud Valley (1940) with Paul Robeson, Blue Scar (1949) Valley of Song (1953), and Tiger Bay (1959). In 1943, she appeared as Maria Petrovitch in the Ealing war film Undercover, an account of the guerrilla resistance movement in Yugoslavia during the Second World War. In 1954 she was part of the original BBC Radio cast of Dylan Thomas' radio play Under Milk Wood, playing the roles of Rosie Probert, Mary Ann Sailors and Mrs. Willy Nilly. She played Mary Ann Sailors in the 1972 film version. She appeared on television, in a lost 1960 production of How Green Was My Valley, in another production of the same work in 1975, and in a soap opera, Pobol y Cwm (People of the Valley), playing Miss Bella Davies. In 1978 she played Betty Parry in the BBC series Off to Philadelphia in the Morning.

Thomas almost always played the stereotypical Welsh mam, a miner's wife or mother (or grandmother in her later years) and appeared in both Welsh and English-language productions. In 1968 she was awarded the OBE for her services to Wales. She received a special BAFTA Cymru award for her body of work in 1991, and became a Fellow of the Royal College of Music and Drama in Cardiff in 1993.

== Personal life ==
Rachel Thomas married educator Howell John Thomas in 1931; they had a daughter, Delyth Mariel Thomas (1937–2006). Rachel Thomas died two days before her 90th birthday, following a fall in her home in Cardiff.
