= Down Came a Blackbird (play) =

1953 play

- Written by: Peter Blackmore
- Original language: English
- Genre: Comedy
- Setting: A villa on the outskirts of Cairo

Premiere
- Date premiered: 1 September 1953
- Place premiered: Q Theatre, London

Down Came a Blackbird is a 1953 comedy play by the British writer Peter Blackmore. It was first staged at Q Theatre in London before transferring to the West End where it ran for 53 performances at the Savoy Theatre between 22 December 1953 and 6 February 1954. Directed by Henry Kendall the cast included Peter Arne, Viola Keats, John Loder and Betty Paul. The title is taken from a line in the traditional nursery rhyme Sing a Song of Sixpence. It takes place entirely in the garden room of the Egyptian villa of Sir Clive Dawson.

== Bibliography ==
- Wearing, J.P. The London Stage 1950–1959: A Calendar of Productions, Performers, and Personnel. Rowman & Littlefield, 2014.
