= Morecambe and Wise: In Their Own Words =

2008 British documentary film

- Country of origin: United Kingdom

Original release
- Network: BBC One
- Release: 2008

Morecambe and Wise: In Their Own Words is a television documentary introduced and narrated by Jonathan Ross. It aired on BBC One on New Year's Day 2008, featuring clips telling the story of the rise to fame of the comedy double act Morecambe and Wise. It featured many previously unseen archive clips of the double-act from their days in variety as separate acts, through to their final shows for Thames Television prior to Eric Morecambe's untimely death at the age of 58 in 1984. Included within the show was one of his last interviews from Gloria Hunniford's Sunday, Sunday programme. As well as the usual clips of their work (mostly drawn from their years with the BBC with some earlier and later footage) there were transcripts of correspondence unearthed from the BBC's records and these were read by impressionist Jon Culshaw throughout the programme.
