= Peter Blackmore (screenwriter) =

British writer (1909–1984)

- Born: 19 March 1909; Clevedon, Somerset, United Kingdom
- Died: 16 September 1984 (aged 75); London, England
- Occupation: Writer
- Years active: 1948–1971 (film)

Peter Blackmore (1909–1984) was a British playwright and screenwriter. His play Miranda was adapted into the 1948 film of the same title. He also wrote the comedy play The Blue Goose which appeared in the West End in 1941. His 1953 play Down Came a Blackbird ran for 53 performances at the Savoy Theatre. He worked on the screenplays for a number of comedy films for British Lion and the Rank Organisation, including two Norman Wisdom vehicles.

== Selected filmography ==
- Miranda (1948)
- Time Gentlemen, Please! (1952)
- Mad About Men (1954)
- Simon and Laura (1955)
- All for Mary (1955)
- Up in the World (1956)
- After the Ball (1957)
- Just My Luck (1957)
- Make Mine a Million (1959)
- Make Mine Mink (1960)
- Mrs. Gibbons' Boys (1962)
- The Intelligence Men (1965)
- That Riviera Touch (1966)
- The Magnificent Two (1967)

== Bibliography ==
- Goble, Alan. The Complete Index to Literary Sources in Film. Walter de Gruyter, 1999.
- Wearing, J.P. The London Stage 1940–1949: A Calendar of Productions, Performers, and Personnel. Rowman & Littlefield, 2014.
