= The Magnificent Two =

1967 British comedy film by Cliff Owen

- British quad poster by Arnaldo Putzu
- Directed by: Cliff Owen
- Written by: Dick Hills and Sid Green; Michael Pertwee; Peter Blackmore
- Based on: a story by Michael Pertwee
- Produced by: Hugh Stewart
- Starring: Eric Morecambe; Ernie Wise
- Cinematography: Ernest Steward
- Edited by: Gerry Hambling
- Music by: Ron Goodwin
- Production company: Rank Organisation
- Distributed by: Rank
- Release date: 5 July 1967 (Longon)
- Running time: 100 min.
- Country: United Kingdom
- Language: English
- Budget: £400,000

The Magnificent Two (also known as What Happened at Campo Grande? and Campo Grande) is a 1967 British comedy film directed by Cliff Owen and starring Morecambe and Wise. It was written by Dick Hills and Sid Green, Michael Pertwee and Peter Blackmore, and was the third and final of their 1960s films.

== Plot ==
Two British Action Man travelling salesmen are sent to the South American country of Parazuellia to sell their goods. During the train journey, Eric accidentally opens a door leading to the death of the returning British educated Torres who is the figurehead of a revolutionary movement and a government secret policeman arresting him. Upon arrival in the city of Campo Grande, Eric is mistaken by the revolutionaries for Torres, and though they discover the death of the real Torres they pay Eric and Ernie to maintain Eric's impersonation of Torres to lead a revolution to oust a brutal dictator. However, once the revolution is successful Eric gains an inflated opinion of himself.

== Cast ==
- Eric Morecambe as Eric
- Ernie Wise as Ernie
- Margit Saad as Carla
- Virgílio Teixeira as Carillo
- Cecil Parker as British ambassador
- Isobel Black as Juanita
- Martin Benson as President Diaz
- Tyler Butterworth as Miguel, President's younger son
- Sandor Elès as Armandez
- Victor Maddern as drunken soldier
- Joe Cornelius as Man
- Michael Gover as doctor

== Production ==
The film was shot at Black Park, the Longmoor Military Railway and Pinewood Studios.

== Reception ==
=== Box office ===
It was one of the twelve most popular films at the British box office in 1967. According to producer Hugh Stewart, due to high costs and the fact the film did not travel internationally, it made a loss.

=== Critical ===
The Monthly Film Bulletin wrote: "Apart from a few jokes, ... the film's humour depends largely on the comic personalities of Morecambe and Wise. Their admirers will find much to enjoy, but others may feel that a lot of energy is being expended to small purpose. Cliff Owen keeps the film moving at a fair pace, and Margit Saad is on hand to supply the glamour and literally disarm the male opposition by leading the Women's Army in a bikini-clad attack through the very English-looking South American countryside."

The Radio Times Guide to Films gave the film 2/5 stars, writing: "Like most British comedians of the 1960s and 1970s, Morecambe and Wise failed to make it in movies because the situations that made their TV series so successful simply could not be sustained beyond an hour or the confines of a studio setting. Here Eric and Ernie do their utmost to kick-start this poor comedy of errors about travelling salesmen caught up in a South American revolution. But the plot is paper thin, the jokes aren't funny and the use of a bikini-clad army to install Margit Saad as president is unworthy of the duo."

Leslie Halliwell said: "More or less a Bob Hope vehicle, adapted for the less realistic Morecambe and Wise with unhappy results: too few sight gags and a curious emphasis on violence. The third and last of their attempts to find film vehicles."

Time Out wrote: "Take Morecambe and Wise away from the stand-up TV routine and what do you have? A lame spoof adventure about travelling salesmen in a South American state torn by revolution ... in which the comedians' special talents are woefully misused. At least Cliff Owen keeps it pacy, making it the least awful of the trio of movies in which the duo failed to take the cinema by storm."

TV Guide described it as a "fair comedy."
