= Maureen Swanson =

British actress (1932–2011)

The Right Honourable The Countess of Dudley
- Born: 25 November 1932; Glasgow, Lanarkshire, Scotland
- Died: 18 November 2011 (aged 78); UK
- Other names: Maureen Ward, Countess of Dudley
- Education: Sadler's Wells Ballet School
- Occupation: Actress
- Years active: 1952–1961
- Spouse: William Ward, 4th Earl of Dudley
- Children: 7

Maureen Ward, Countess of Dudley, known professionally as Maureen Swanson (25 November 1932 – 16 November 2011), was a British actress. As Maureen Swanson, she featured in British pictures during the 1950s. She retired from acting in 1961, following her marriage to Viscount Ednam.

Filmink magazine called her "immensely watchable on screen, and might have had a very strong career had her personal life not intervened."

== Early life and career ==
Maureen Swanson was born in Glasgow on 25 November 1932, the daughter of James Swanson. After her parents emigrated to South Africa, she became a ward of Lady Phyllis Griffith-Boscawen. Swanson initially trained as a classical ballerina at the Sadler's Wells Ballet School, before moving into musical theatre and film.

She was touring in a production of Carousel when selected over 50 applicants to play a key role in Moulin Rouge (1952). This led to a larger part in Valley of Song (1953) and a strong support role in MGM's Knights of the Round Table (1953). Swanson was the female lead in Hammer's film noir Third Party Risk (1954). Swanson was also in episodes of The Vise, and had a supporting part in Orders Are Orders (1955).

== Rank Organisation ==
Swanson was signed to a long-term contract by the Rank Organisation. In February 1956, John Davis of Rank announced that she would be in four films at the studio. She played support roles in A Town Like Alice (1956) and Jacqueline (1956). She was Norman Wisdom's leading lady in Up in the World (1956), and Dirk Bogarde's leading lady in The Spanish Gardener (1956). Filmink argued that, "Swanson made a particularly noticeable splash in A Town Like Alice effectively contrasting with the “sensible girl” persona of star Virginia McKenna (it’s a great pity that they were never re-teamed, they could’ve made a wonderful double act)."

In October 1956, John Davis, managing director of Rank, announced Swanson as one of the actors under contract whom Davis thought would become an international star. She was the female lead in Robbery Under Arms (1957). She made her West End debut in The Happiest Millionaire and appeared in her first television play in The Importance of Being Earnest (1950).

In July 1957 Swanson was named in a divorce suit brought by the wife of South African businessman John Schlesinger; she was accused of being one of several women with whom Schlesinger committed adultery. The accusation against Swanson was eventually dropped in May 1958.

In March 1958 an article on Anne Heywood described Swanson (along with Belinda Lee) as "those well-scrubbed Pinewood pretties who promised 'the goods' but didn't deliver." It said that Swanson was "preoccupied with the stage (and a noble lord) - now sliding daintily out of the film orbit."

In November 1958 Rank dropped her from their books. Filmink argued "Rank was a conservative studio, and we think that they found all the drama too much. And so, it stopped casting Maureen Swanson in movies and eventually dropped her from their books – just as they did with Belinda Lee."

"People think of me as a cold, calculating good time girl" complained Swanson in April 1959.

== Marriage ==
Swanson married Viscount Ednam on 24 August 1961 at Amersham register office. She was his second wife. Initially titled Viscountess Ednam, she was styled as the Countess of Dudley on 26 December 1969, following her husband's succession to the earldom.

They had seven children:

- Hon. William Ward (born and died stillborn 21 October 1961)
- Lady Susanna Louise Ward (born 23 May 1963), unmarried and without issue
- Lady Melissa Patricia Eileen Ward (born 18 July 1964), married in 1991 to Simon Puxley; has daughter (India Ward Puxley; born 1991)
- Lady Victoria Larissa Cecilia Ward (born 28 May 1966), unmarried and has son (George Ward-Carstairs; born 18-12-96)
- Lady Amelia Maureen Erica Ward (born 5 September 1967), unmarried and without issue
- Lady Cressida Emma Sophia Ward (born 7 January 1970), married on 29 June 1996 to Oliver Preston, without issue, divorced 1998. She married, secondly, in a civil service in July 2011 in London, and on 1 October 2011 in Sicily in a Roman Catholic wedding, to Dr. Ludovic Toro; Ward has a daughter from a prior relationship (Lily Rose Ward Davis; born 2 November 2004)
- Hon. Leander Grenville Dudley Ward - 6th Earl of Dudley (born 31 October 1971), married British journalist Laura Sevier on 23 July 2011

One of his nieces was Rachel Ward.

== Later life ==
As the Countess of Dudley, she managed the couple's homes in Cottesmore Gardens, Kensington, London and Devon. She also served as a lady in waiting to Princess Michael of Kent.

She and her husband separated in the late 1980s but reunited. In October 1996 she and her husband were held up by thieves who stole their jewels.

Swanson died on 16 November 2011 and was laid to rest in the private burial ground of the Earls of Dudley at the rear of the parish church at Himley.

== Libel case ==
In a 1989 libel case, Lady Dudley testified that she had an affair in the early 1950s with Stephen Ward, the osteopath and artist who was one of the central figures in the 1963 Profumo affair. They became friends when he was commissioned to draw her portrait in 1953 – 10 years before the Profumo scandal. From the 1989 court case, Lady Dudley won "substantial" damages from the publishers of Honeytrap: the Secret Worlds of Stephen Ward by Anthony Summers and Stephen Dorril, in which the authors suggested that she had been one of the "popsies" whom Ward had procured for his influential friends. In 2002, the Countess of Dudley again accepted substantial libel damages from the publishers of Christine Keeler: The Truth At Last, Keeler's own account of the events surrounding her notorious affair with the former war minister John Profumo, in which she referred to Lady Dudley as having been "one of Stephen's girls".

== Filmography ==
- Moulin Rouge (1952) .... Denise de Frontiac
- Valley of Song (1953) .... Olwen Davies
- Knights of the Round Table (1953) .... Elaine
- One Just Man (1954)
- Third Party Risk (1954) .... Marina
- Orders Are Orders (1954) .... Joanne Delamere
- Douglas Fairbanks, Jr., Presents (1954, Episode: "Rehearsal") .... Marguerite
- The Vise (1954–1955, TV Series) .... Susan, Craig's daughter / Maria / Maria / Susan Allerton
- Three Cornered Fate (1955) .... Maria
- The Bob Hope Show (1956, Episode: "Douglas Fairbanks Jr., Cornel Wilde, Elsa Martinelli, Jean Wallace") .... Herself
- A Town Like Alice (1956) .... Ellen
- Jacqueline (1956) .... Maggie
- Up in the World (1956) .... Jeannie Andrews
- The Spanish Gardener (1956) .... Maria
- Robbery Under Arms (1957) .... Kate Morrison Mullockson
- The Edgar Wallace Mystery Theatre (1960, Episode: "The Malpas Mystery") .... Audrey Bedford
- No Hiding Place (1961, Episode: "A Warrant for Joe Roberts") .... Ann Evans (final appearance)

== Theatre ==
- The Dashing White Sergeant (1955)
- The Happiest Millionaire (1957)
- Who's Your Father? by Dennis Cannan, opposite Donald Sinden, at the Cambridge Theatre (1958)
