= Blue Scar =

1949 British film by Jill Craigie

- Opening title
- Directed by: Jill Craigie
- Written by: Jill Craigie
- Produced by: William MacQuitty
- Starring: Emrys Jones; Gwyneth Vaughan; Rachel Thomas; Anthony Pendrell; Prysor Williams
- Cinematography: Jo Jago
- Edited by: Kenneth Hume
- Music by: Grace Williams
- Production company: Outlook Films
- Distributed by: British Lion Film Corporation (UK)
- Release date: 1949
- Running time: 90 mins.
- Country: United Kingdom
- Language: English

Blue Scar is a 1949 British drama film directed by documentary filmmaker Jill Craigie and starring Emrys Jones and Gwyneth Vaughn. Set in a Welsh village where the mine has recently been nationalised, it focuses on the relationship between Olwen Williams, a miner's daughter who leaves the village to live in London, and Tom Thomas, who dedicates his life to working in the mine. With Craigie's background in documentary films with a social message, Blue Scar was designed to raise questions about the value of nationalising the coal industry. It was the only non-documentary film Craigie directed.

== Plot ==
Olwen Williams is a miner's daughter from a mining town in South Wales, where the mine has recently been nationalised. She is keen to move on from her impoverished upbringing to a more fulfilling lifestyle. An opportunity is presented to her when she wins a singing scholarship to a music college in Cardiff. She decides to leave her hometown to take up this opportunity, which means being away from Tom Thomas, a local miner who is in love with her.

While Olwen is away from home, an industrial psychologist from London named Alfred Collins proposes to her, and she accepts. She announces this news to Tom while attending her father's funeral following a mining accident. Olwen moves to London with Alfred, but is disillusioned by her new life there.

Meanwhile, Tom is injured in a mining accident and spends time at Talygarn, a convalescent home. Herehe is looked after by Glynis, a physiotherapist and friend of Olwen. Tom and Glynis fall in love. Tom also encounters success at work, rising to the position of manager. After his promotion, he visits Olwen in London, in a vain attempt to persuade her to return to Wales. Tom later dies of a mining-related condition. The film ends with Olwen singing "Home! Sweet Home!" in a radio broadcast.

== Cast ==
- Emrys Jones as Tom Thomas
- Gwyneth Vaughan as Olwen Williams
- Rachel Thomas as Gwenneth 'Gwen' Williams
- Prysor Williams as Ted Williams
- Anthony Pendrell as Alfred Collins
- Madoline Thomas as granny
- Jack James as Dai Morgan
- Francis Lunt as Mr Sharp
- Dilys Jones as Glenis Thomas-Evans
- Kenneth Griffith as Thomas Williams
- D.L. Davies as Wyn Jones
- Phil Burton as Mr Llewellyn
- David Keir as waiter
- Winston Edwards as Owen Williams
- Dan Bevan as doctor
- Patsy Drake as Phyllis
- Pauline Bentley as Peggy
- Non Evans as Welsh miner
- Tom Thomas as Welsh miner
- Douglas Jones as Welsh miner
- Isaac Parry as Welsh miner
- Curwen Davies as Welsh miner
- Harry Walters as Welsh miner
- John Williams as Welsh miner
- Hiram Thomas as Welsh miner
- Michael Stankiewicz as Polish miner
- Prudence Hyman as Moira Thalberg
- Antony Verney as Mack
- Pearl Evans as Veronica
- Julian Somers as Richard Gosling
- Ernest Berk as Leon Kavitchinoff
- The Port Talbot Municipal Choir as choir
- Afan Glee Society as choir

== Production ==
Blue Scar was produced by Outlook Films, an independent production company established in 1948 by director Jill Craigie and managed in partnership with producer William MacQuitty. Craigie was a socialist documentary filmmaker, and Blue Scar was the first and only non-documentary film she directed; after Blue Scar, she concluded that documentary was the best film genre for social criticism.

The film was conceived as a critical commentary on the nationalisation of the coal industry, especially in terms of safety, working conditions and the treatment of miners. The title, Blue Scar, is a reference to the blue colour that characterises wounded skin when affected by coal dust. Half of the funding came from the National Coal Board, although there is disagreement about the total cost of production: according to Craigie, the film cost £80,000, whereas MacQuitty placed the figure in his autobiography as £45,000.

The disused Electric Theatre cinema in the Welsh town of Port Talbot served as a makeshift studio, hired at a charge of £1 per day. The interior of the cinema was adapted for the filming, including the construction of a soundproof stage. Coal was brought in for filming scenes in the mine itself. Other scenes were shot on location in Abergwynfi, a village in south west Wales. Most of the cast consisted of amateur actors drawn from the local area.

The film was scored by Welsh composer Grace Williams. As well as being Williams's first film score, this was the first time a British woman had scored a feature film.

== Release ==
The film's treatment of its subject matter created difficulties for distribution, as cinemas were reluctant to show it. MacQuitty later recalled: "We had no clout. We couldn't force them to take it. At that time there was a feeling that people wanted only escapism, not reality". Daily Herald critic Richard Winnington led a campaign for the film to be released in ABC Cinemas and, after a series of test screenings, the film was eventually distributed within the ABC chain.

== Reception ==
Film studies specialists have disagreed about the film's reception when it was released. According to Gwendolyn Audrey Foster, the film was met with "excellent reviews and enthusiastic audience response", but Philip Gillett has suggested the opposite.

In the Monthly Film Bulletin, the British Film Institute review praised the film's realism, in authentically capturing the life and environment of the mining village. The reviewer, however, suggested that the plot had "many absurdities" and that Craigie, although talented as a director, had "rather less talent for story-telling".

A reviewer in The Times shared this view, stating that the miners' lives were well-captured, but that the social message was "not very clear" and the film's ending was "just plain silly". The reviewer was also uncertain about the mix of documentary and fiction elements, feeling that "the blend of romantic story and objective demonstration of the ways of the Welsh mining villages is not always harmonious".
