= Statue of Eric Morecambe =

Statue in Morecambe, Lancashire, England

Coordinates: 54.07300°N 2.86788°W

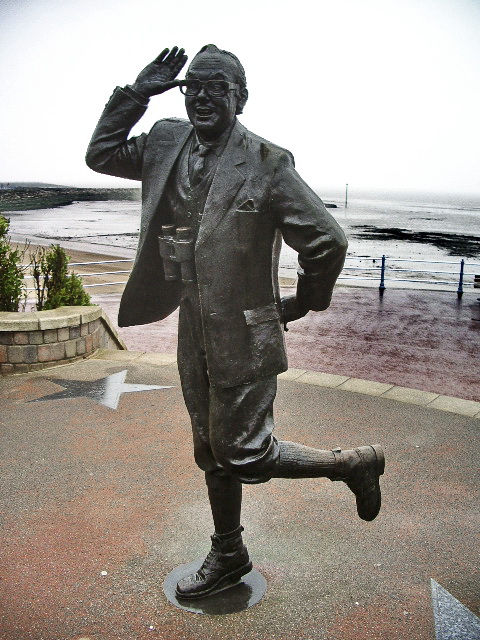
The statue in 2008

The Statue of Eric Morecambe in Morecambe, Lancashire, England is a commemorative bronze sculpture of English comedian Eric Morecambe (1926–1984) by Graham Ibbeson. It was unveiled by the Queen in July 1999. It depicts Morecambe in his "Bring Me Sunshine" pose and overlooks Morecambe Bay.

The statue was vandalised in October 2014, having one of its legs sawn off. Subsequently, it was moved to London for repair and was restored on 11 December 2014.
