= The Blue Goose =

1940 play

- Cover of the 1951 novelisation
- Original language: English
- Written by: Peter Blackmore
- Genre: Comedy
- Setting: Watermouth Regis, England

Premiere
- Date: 8 April 1940
- Place: Richmond Theatre, London

The Blue Goose is a comedy play by the British writer Peter Blackmore. It was first staged at Richmond Theatre on 8 April 1940. The following year it transferred to the Comedy Theatre in London's West End where it ran for 68 performances between 23 January and 15 March 1941. The West End cast included Viola Lyel, Ian Fleming, Iris Hoey, Billy Merson, Davina Craig and John Warwick who was replaced during the run by Ballard Berkeley. In 1951 Blackmore produced a novelisation of the play, published by Ward Lock.

The play is set in the small coastal town of Weymouth Regis, where the annual operatic society's performance of The Mikado is taking place. The lead role is played, as always by Mrs Portal the wife of a council official. Meanwhile, one of her daughters plans to elope with the captain of the yacht The Blue Goose. However, when the captain falls overboard and she drifts out to sea, the lifeboat crew are called out still wearing their costumes from the performance.

== Bibliography ==
- Wearing, J.P. The London Stage 1940-1949: A Calendar of Productions, Performers, and Personnel. Rowman & Littlefield, 2014.
