= On the Run (1963 film) =

1963 British film by Robert Tronson

- Theatrical release poster
- Directed by: Robert Tronson
- Screenplay by: Richard Harris
- Based on: a story by Edgar Wallace
- Produced by: Jack Greenwood
- Starring: Emrys Jones; Sarah Lawson; Patrick Barr
- Edited by: Derek Holding
- Music by: Bernard Ebbinghouse
- Production company: Merton Park Studios
- Distributed by: Anglo-Amalgamated
- Release date: 14 April 1963
- Running time: 57 minutes
- Country: United Kingdom
- Language: English

On the Run is a 1963 British film directed by Robert Tronson and starring Emrys Jones, Sarah Lawson and Patrick Barr. Part of the series of Edgar Wallace Mysteries films made at Merton Park Studios, it is based on a story by Wallace.

== Plot ==
Frank Stewart escapes from prison with outside help from criminal bookie Wally Lucas. Stewart discovers that Lucas is trying to get his hands on some hidden bonds, the location of which only Stewart knows. Stewart goes into hiding, helped by model agency owner Helen Carr, but Lucas's gang kidnaps them. To save Helen, Frank reveals that the bonds are hidden in a sewer and fights it out with Lucas there until the police arrive.

== Cast ==
- Emrys Jones as Frank Stewart
- Sarah Lawson as Helen Carr
- Patrick Barr as Brent
- Delphi Lawrence as Yvonne
- Kevin Stoney as Wally Lucas
- William Abney as Jock Mackay
- Katy Wild as Jean Stewart
- Philip Locke as Dave Hughes
- Richard Warner as Prison Governor
- Brian Haines as Vance
- Garfield Morgan as Meredith
- Brian Wilde as Chief Warder
- Ken Wayne as Bryce
- Bee Duffell as Mrs. Thomas

== Critical reception ==
The Monthly Film Bulletin wrote: "The plot of this addition to the Edgar Wallace series runs to formula, though leaving untidy loose ends – whether or not the bonds are recovered, and whether the budding romance blossoms or fades, for example. But the most curious aspect of the film is the unorthodox, and even perplexing, characterisation of the police: Patrick Barr portrays a moderately conventional Sergeant whose superior (played by Garfield Morgan) is a singularly obnoxious person, mean in temperament, and forever sponging on his subordinate. Various details in the script stress the Inspector's unlikeable personality, but to no purpose beyond the eventual suggestion by the Sergeant that he would like one of his superior's cigarettes for a change."
