= Eric Pulford =

British poster artist

An early poster by Pulford for which he did the design and art himself. 'Odd Man Out starring James Mason.

Eric William Pulford (8 August 1915 – 30 July 2005) was a British commercial artist who, in a career of over 50 years, was responsible for over 1000 cinema poster designs.

== Early life ==
Eric William Pulford was born in Beeston, a suburb of Leeds, in August 1915, the eldest of five children of a butcher father, and was educated there at Cockburn High School, until he left aged 14.

== Early career ==
His career began in 1940 when Pulford, who was then doing freelance engineering illustration, began painting posters for Rank cinemas in the Leeds area. His work included Gaslight, The Bluebird, and Thief Of Baghdad. In 1943 he was asked by Rank to set up a design studio in London and Pulford Publicity was established, funded by Downton Advertising, a Fleet Street agency connected with Rank. One of the first employees was the lettering artist Tom Brownlow.

In the early years, Pulford did most of the design and painting himself. Early examples are Henry V (1944), Odd Man Out (1946) and Oliver Twist (1948).

== 1950s & 60s ==
Africa Fly There by BOAC poster by Eric Pulford, c. 1959.

From the 1950s Pulford began to concentrate more on design with other illustrators producing the art work.

Pulford Publicity bought a controlling interest in Downtons in the early 1960s and, as Downtons, became Britain's premier film advertising agency. Clients included Rank who owned the Gaumont and Odeon cinema chains, British Lion, Universal, United Artists and RKO. In 1965 Downtons merged with the Dixons agency, adding Columbia and Disney, and later Avco-Embassy and Brent Walker, to its portfolio of clients.

One of Pulford's innovations was to bring talented young Italian artists to London. One was Renato Fratini in 1958, who became one of important artists working for the Downton Agency.

Among the important Rank films for which Pulford designed the poster were the later Norman Wisdom comedies, the "Doctor" films, and the Carry On series. He sometimes visited the sets of films in production and was lucky enough to attend the filming of the chariot race in Rome for the 1959 epic Ben Hur.

== 1970s and 80s ==
In 1973 Pulford won an award for his design for the poster of Disney's The Island at the Top of the World (1973).

By the end of his career Pulford was mainly supervising others and designing posters but not preparing the artwork. He continued to produce some finished works, however, including Stranger In The House (1967), The Lady Vanishes (1979), and Breathless (1983). The last complete poster that he produced was for The Evil that Men Do (1984), starring Charles Bronson. He retired in 1984.

== Other work ==
Cinema posters were the mainstay for Pulford and Downtons, but amongst the other work completed were airline travel posters for BOAC.
