= Graham Ibbeson =

British artist and sculptor (born 1951)

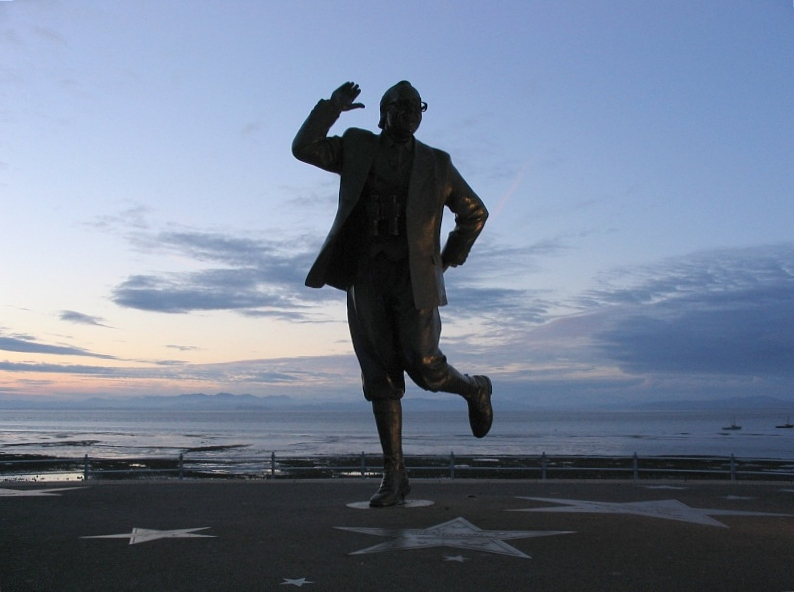
Ibbeson's statue of Eric Morecambe in Morecambe, Lancashire

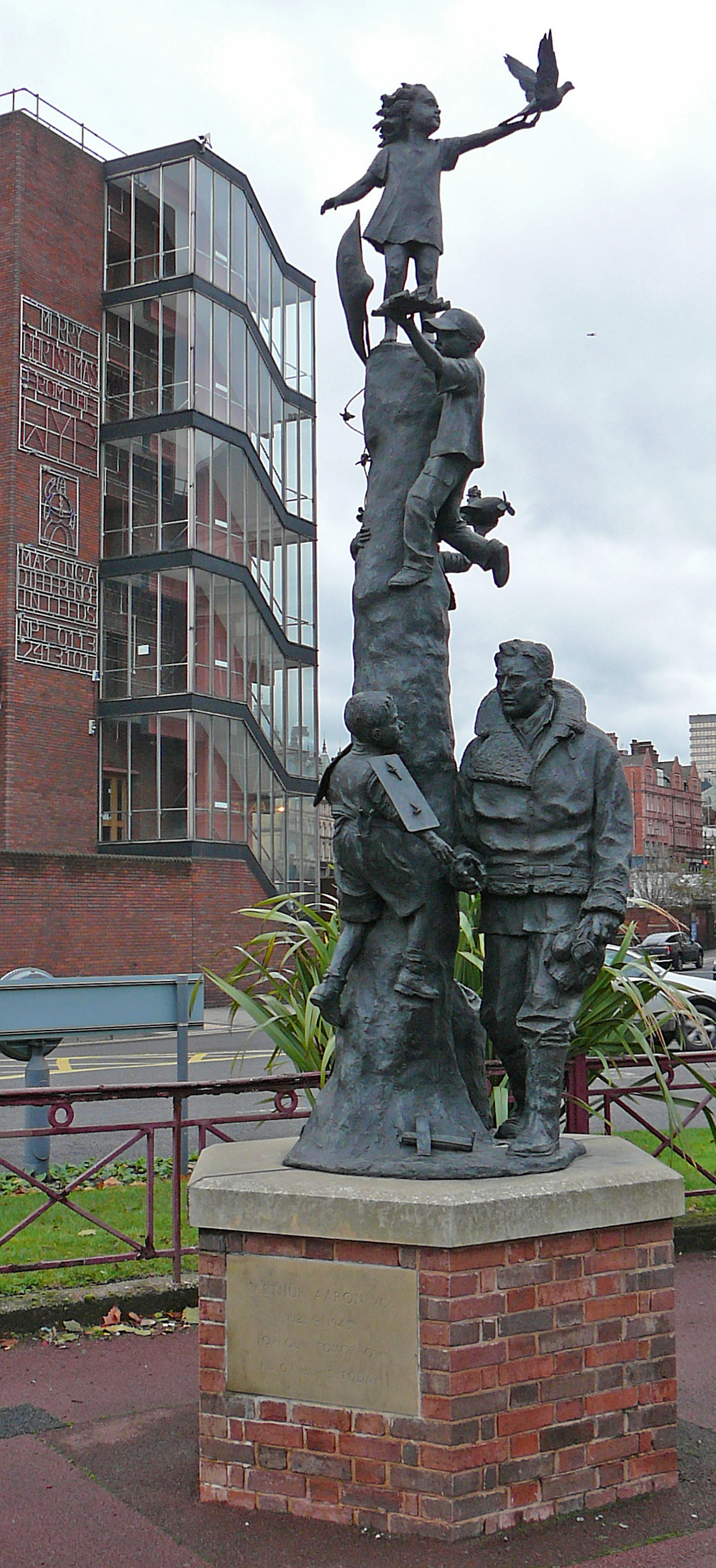
Ibbeson's statue of Arthur Louis Aaron in Leeds

Graham Ibbeson MBE (born 1951) is a British artist and sculptor, known for the realistic figurative sculptures he has created for public commissions in the United Kingdom.

== Biography ==
Ibbeson was born in Barnsley, South Yorkshire, and from 1972 to 1973 attended Leicester Polytechnic. From 1973 to 1975 he studied at Trent Polytechnic in Nottingham before spending three years at the Royal College of Art in London. While still a student there Ibbeson won commissions from both the Commonwealth Institute and the London Symphony Orchestra and in 1978 received the Madame Tussaud Award for Figurative Art. Exhibitions of his work have been held at the Nottingham Castle Museum, at the Royal College of Art Gallery in London, at the Olanda Kelly Gallery in Chicago and, frequently, at the Nicholas Treadwell Gallery in London.

Ibbeson has created bronze sculptures in towns and cities across Britain including of Fred Trueman in Skipton, Don Revie in Leeds, of Thomas Chippendale in Otley, and others in Cardiff, Dover, Barnsley, Doncaster, Northampton, Chesterfield, Middlesbrough, Perth and Rugby.

On 30 June 2009 a cricket umpire known as Dickie Bird unveiled a life-sized bronze statue of himself by Ibbeson, erected in his honour, near his birthplace in Barnsley. It has subsequently been raised by putting it on a 5-foot (1.5 m) plinth in order to discourage late-night revellers hanging inappropriate items on the famous finger.

One of Ibbeson's most famous pieces is the Statue of Eric Morecambe, which stands in the comedian's seaside hometown of Morecambe, Lancashire and which was unveiled by the Queen. In 2001 Ibbeson's statue of Arthur Louis Aaron (recipient of the Victoria Cross) was erected in Leeds. His bronze statue of Cary Grant was unveiled in 2001 in Millennium Square in Grant's hometown of Bristol. Ibbeson has also sculpted Laurel and Hardy; the bronze statue was erected in Laurel's home town of Ulverston in April 2009. Another commission was a statue of Benny Hill for the comedian's hometown of Southampton.
