= A Man Could Get Killed =

1966 film by Ronald Neame

- Theatrical release poster
- Directed by: Ronald Neame; Cliff Owen
- Screenplay by: Richard L. Breen; T. E. B. Clarke
- Based on: the novel "Diamonds for Moscow" by David Esdaile Walker
- Produced by: Robert Arthur
- Starring: James Garner; Melina Mercouri; Sandra Dee; Anthony Franciosa; Robert Coote
- Cinematography: Gábor Pogány
- Edited by: Alma Macrorie
- Music by: Bert Kaempfert; Herbert Rehbein; Charles Singleton; Eddie Snyder; Buddy Scot; Jimmy Radcliffe
- Production company: Cherokee Productions
- Distributed by: Universal Pictures
- Release date: March 25, 1966 (United States)
- Running time: 97 minutes
- Country: United States
- Language: English

A Man Could Get Killed is a 1966 American adventure comedy film directed by Ronald Neame and Cliff Owen, shot on various locations in Portugal, and starring James Garner, Melina Mercouri, Sandra Dee, Anthony Franciosa, and Robert Coote.

The screenplay was written by Richard L. Breen, T. E. B. Clarke, based on David Esdaile Walker's novel Diamonds for Moscow, published in 1953 (later American title: Diamonds for Danger). The film introduced the melody of "Strangers in the Night" by German composer Bert Kaempfert, which won the Golden Globe Award for "Best Original Song in a Motion Picture" of 1967.

== Plot ==
An unsuspecting William Beddoes arrives in Lisbon on behalf of an American bank. He is mistaken for a dead agent's replacement, on a secret mission concerning a fortune in missing industrial diamonds, by British embassy official Hatton-Jones, who comes to Beddoes' aid.

Also taking an interest is Aurora Celeste, the dead man's lover, as well as Steve Antonio, a smuggler, who is being pursued by Amy Franklin (a woman who, as a young girl, had a crush on him).

Much later, all of the above end up aboard a yacht belonging to Dr. Mathieson, who appears to be the mastermind of the crime, but does not know where the diamonds are hidden. Beddoes ends up engineering an escape for all, and the gems wind up safely in the hands of Hatton-Jones, the dead agent's actual successor.

Beddoes books a flight for home, assuming he will never see any of these people again, but Aurora steals his ticket and passport so that he cannot leave.

== Cast ==
- James Garner as William Beddoes
- Melina Mercouri as Aurora Celeste
- Sandra Dee as Amy Franklin
- Tony Franciosa as Steve Antonio
- Robert Coote as Hatton-Jones
- Roland Culver as Dr. Mathieson
- Grégoire Aslan as Florian
- Cecil Parker as Sir Huntley Frazier
- Dulcie Gray as Mrs. Mathieson
- Martin Benson as Politanu
- Peter Illing as Zarik
- Niall MacGinnis as Ship's Captain
- Virgílio Teixeira as Inspector Rodrigues
- Isabel Dean as Miss Bannister
- Daniele Vargas as Osman
- Ann Firbank as Miss Nolan
- John Bartha as Ludmar

== Production ==
Scenes were filmed in Rome and Lisbon. The working title was Welcome, Mr. Beddoes.

The cast had a falling out with director Cliff Owen, who was replaced by Ronald Neame in July 1965. Neame recalled that co-stars James Garner and Tony Franciosa did not get on well, and their fight in the film became a real brawl.

Garner calls the film "disappointing", although he says he enjoyed playing backgammon with Melina Mercouri and her husband Jules Dassin. He did admit to punching Tony Franciosa, claiming it was because he "kept abusing the stunt men" and would not pull his punches in fight scenes.

It was the last film Sandra Dee made under contract to Universal. According to a 1965 interview with the actress, she "begged [the producers] not to make [her] do the picture. So I spent a miserable four months in Lisbon, little fishing villages and in Rome, making a picture that should have taken eight weeks. We had two changes of directors, and I ended up playing Come September all over again."

== Soundtrack ==
The score for A Man Could Get Killed was composed by Bert Kaempfert, with the assistance of Herbert Rehbein, and recorded under the musical direction of Universal's Joseph Gershenson. It introduced the melody of the song "Strangers in the Night", which was initially to be sung by Melina Mercouri, but she insisted that her voice would not fit to the melody, and it should be given to a man. Eventually, the version by Frank Sinatra became a global number-one hit and is now considered a standard of easy listening music. The tune, listed in the original sound track as "Beddy Bye", permeates the movie and won the 1967 Golden Globe Award for Best Original Song in a Motion Picture, beating "Un homme et une femme" by French orchestra leader Francis Lai, "Born Free" by John Barry, which won the 1966 Academy Award for Best Original Song, "Alfie" by Burt Bacharach, and "Georgy Girl" by Tom Springfield, all from the eponymous movies, the latter two also having been Oscar nominees in 1966.

The overall score of the movie, often resorting to Latin- and even seemingly Greek-influenced imagery, had a more mixed reception. The soundtrack LP - in fact a rerecording of the score - was produced by Milt Gabler and recorded at Polydor Studios in Hamburg, Germany. It was originally released on an LP by Decca (Decca DL 74750) and on a CD in 1999 by Taragon Records, then combined with Bert Kaempfert's LP Strangers in the Night, originally released in 1966 (Decca DL 74795).

== Home media ==
On 16 June 2026, A Man Could Get Killed was officially released on Blu-ray by Kino-Lorber, in association with Universal Pictures. This is the film's first legal home video release.
