= Association of Jewish Ex-Servicemen and Women =

British charitable organization

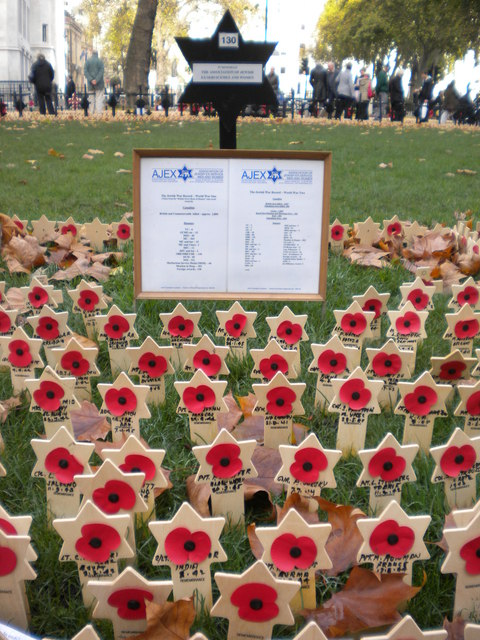
Tokens of remembrance in the plot for the Association of Jewish Ex-Servicemen and Women (AJEX), at the Field of Remembrance at Westminster

The Association of Jewish Ex-Servicemen and Women (AJEX; prior to 1939, the Association of Jewish Ex-Servicemen, and from 1928 to 1939, the Jewish Ex-Servicemen's Legion) is a non-political charitable organisation that focuses on issues affecting Jewish British former servicemen and women.

It holds an annual Commemoration of Remembrance and Parade every November to pay tribute to servicemen and women who have died in battle. As of 2013, it had 40 branches in the United Kingdom.

== History ==
The association is a non-political charitable organisation that focuses on issues affecting Jewish British former servicemen and women, and was founded in Whitechapel in East London in 1928 as the Jewish Ex-Servicemen's Legion. King George V gave the organisation the right to hold a religious ceremony at The Cenotaph each year from 1934, and in 1936 it changed its name to AJEX.

== See also ==
- Jewish Military Museum
