= Morecambe & Wise: Greatest Moments =

Morecambe & Wise: Greatest Moments was a compilation programme originally aired on 2 December 2007 on the UKTV network channel UKTV Gold and featured clips, interviews and home move footage, culminating in the showing of the "best" sketches from their programmes. It featured contributions from several of their guest stars such as Cliff Richard, Edward Woodward, Bruce Forsyth, Francis Matthews, Michele Dotrice and Elton John whom Eric always referred to as "Elephant John" as well as interviews with both Joan Morecambe and Doreen Wise, the latter's first appearance on a show of this kind. There were also chats with writer Eddie Braben, co-star Ann Hamilton and fans Armstrong & Miller among others. The show was narrated by Liza Tarbuck, daughter of comedian Jimmy Tarbuck and gave the following as the choice of "best" sketches from to duo:

  - Antony & Cleopatra (With Glenda Jackson)
  - Singin' In The Rain Routine
  - "The Stripper" Breakfast Routine
  - Greig's Piano Concert (With André Previn)
  - "Exactly Like You" (With Tom Jones)

The show highlighted the high regard in which the pair are still held by the viewing public and their peers despite having last worked together in 1983 and many of the guest stars featured now being largely unknown to the youth of the twenty-first century. Their appeal had further been secured by the release of their first three series of BBC shows and the associated Christmas Specials on DVD earlier in the year. Also, as part of the anniversary celebrations for BAFTA earlier in the year, contemporary comedians Armstrong & Miller has recreated their famous making the breakfast scene, re-igniting interest in them.
