= Renato Fratini =

Book cover and cinema poster artist (1932–1973)

Renato Fratini, c. 1970.

Fratini's first U.K. magazine illustration. A double page spread for Woman's Mirror, 1963.

Fratini's poster for Waterloo, 1970, from a design by Eric Pulford.

A typical historical romance cover by Fratini. Fiona by Catherine Gaskin, Fontana, 1972.

Renato Fratini (1932 – 1973) was an Italian commercial artist who specialised in cinema posters and book covers. His heyday was in 1960s London.

== Biography ==
Born in Rome, Renato Fratini studied at the Accademia di Belle Arti di Roma. He began his career in the early 1950s by joining the studio owned by the Guerri brothers. There he mostly worked on illustrations and comic strips. In 1952 he joined the Augusto Favalli's studio, which was at that time Italy's biggest producer of film posters. He worked with artists such as Nicola Simbari, Enrico DeSeta and Giorgio De Gaspari.

During his six-year stay in the studio, Fratini made many illustrations for films such as Senso, Invaders from Mars, Sweet Smell of Success, and Beautiful but Dangerous, the last including a portrait of Gina Lollobrigida. Fratini also experimented with abstract elements.

Following the collapse of the Favalli studio in the late 1950s he moved to Milan and joined the D'ami studio. Through agents he got commissions to paint covers for Sexton Blake, Famous Romance Library and Thriller, all from Fleetway Publications.

He moved to London in late 1958, despite not speaking English, and there he enjoyed a very productive career throughout the 1960s.

It was Eric Pulford, who ran the Downton agency, that brought Fratini to London. Downton held the Rank account and accounts with most of the other large studios. Rank was connected to the Cinecittà studios in Rome and Fratini was working at the Cinecittà publicity studio, Studio Favalli.

In cinema posters, Fratini produced the artwork for From Russia With Love (1963) from a design by Eddie Paul. Other work included Whistle Down The Wind (1961), Phantom of the Opera (1962), This Sporting Life (1963), The Chalk Garden (1964), Hot Enough for June (1964), Maroc 7 (1966), Khartoum (1966). Often Eric Pulford produced the design and Fratini did the painting.

Fratini also illustrated most of the posters for the Carry On films of the period from designs by Pulford, starting with Don't Lose Your Head (1966) up to Carry on at Your Convenience (1971). By then he was making £1000 per poster.

As a poster painter, the high point was in 1970 when Fratini was paid £2000 for his work on Waterloo from a design by Eric Pulford. Vic Fair commented on the apparently detailed design "All that detail ... Fratini could just knock it in. Look closely, and there's actually nothing there! Genius, really."

In London he completed work for publishers Corgi, Coronet, Hodder and Pan amongst others. He often used the palette knife and the unpolished nature of his work was both atmospheric and popular with art directors who could use it without needing to spend more on finishing.

He was commissioned by Penguin art director Germano Facetti to prepare new covers for the paperback editions of Daphne du Maurier's novels. The well-received covers combined paint and pencil to create distinctive tableaux of juxtaposed images with a rough unfinished tone.

Covers for historical romance novels by Juliette Benzoni, Catherine Gaskin, Victoria Holt, Norah Lofts and others were a staple of his output and he produced many for Fontana, for whom he was a favourite artist. His work was still being used years after his death until styles gradually changed.

Fratini was an active magazine illustrator. His first U.K. magazine commission was a double page spread for Woman's Mirror, 1963. He also worked for Homes and Garden, Woman's Journal and Woman. In 1965 he was asked to illustrate a Modesty Blaise serial for King magazine over four issues.

In 1959 Fratini met the fashion designer Georgina Somerset-Butler at a party and they married in 1961, after which she went by the name Gina Fratini. They later divorced. Fratini was known for his exuberant love of life. Gina said "He loved food, loved drink, loved cigars, loved dancing ... he just liked to generally live it up. He adored jazz, and we were always out at Ronnie Scott's."

Fratini had a great confidence in his own abilities, which was justified by his skill. Ken Paul described him as "the only man I ever saw who could actually draw with a paintbrush".

He left for Mexico in around 1970 but continued to do some work for the U.K. He also did work for the American market at this time including advertising for Pepsi Cola. He was at a beach party in Mexico in 1973 when he died suddenly, reportedly of a heart attack.
