= Jewish Military Museum =

Former museum in North London

- The location of the museum in Barnet
- Location: Hendon, Barnet, North London
- Coordinates: 51.58763°N 0.220095°W
- Type: Military history
- President: Henry Morris
- Website: www.thejmm.org.uk

The Jewish Military Museum was a museum located in Hendon, Barnet, north London, which featured exhibits about Jews serving in the British armed forces from the 18th century to the present day. It has now closed and the collection was moved to the Jewish Museum London in Camden in 2015.

== History ==
The museum was founded by the Association of Jewish Ex-Servicemen and Women (Ajex) in 1996, as an outgrowth of a memorial room at the Association's headquarters in Stamford Hill. The idea for the museum originated with Henry Morris, who saw it as a way of remembering those who had died in active service, and of countering the mistaken belief that Jews have avoided fighting in the armed forces. Morris worked with Ajex's archivist Martin Sugarman to expand the collection, which necessitated a move to a larger space. The museum moved to a location on Harmony Way in Barnet in 2004. It was granted accreditation from the Museums, Libraries and Archives Council in 2010. In January 2015, the Museum amalgamated with the Jewish Museum in Camden and as a result far less material is on display but researchers may still access it by appointment in the archives of the Jewish Museum's Military Section.

Dress uniform of Lt Frank Alexander de Pass on display at the Jewish Military Museum in 2013

== Collections and exhibitions ==
The museum held a range of items relating to Jewish people who have served in the British armed forces, including uniforms, medals, photographs, letters and official documents. The collections cover conflicts from the 18th century to the present day, including Trafalgar, Waterloo, the Boer War, the First and Second World Wars, the Falklands War and the modern-day conflict in Afghanistan. Among these, there was a particular focus on the two World Wars. The museum digitised the service records of all British Jews who served in the Second World War, and these records can be accessed via an interactive "Record of Honour" database.

Between November 2010 and January 2011, the museum loaned some of its artefacts for an external exhibition at Cardiff Castle. This was the first touring exhibition from the museum, and was intended as a trial to test the viability of a nationwide tour.
