= Off-Peak Return =

Type of National Rail train tickets

The Off-Peak Return is a type of train ticket used on National Rail services in Great Britain. The ticket was introduced as the Saver Return by British Rail in 1985, being rebranded to its current name on 7 September 2008.

== Variants ==
The Off-Peak Return is complemented by various sister products, with the full range comprising:

Ticket Name	Main Features	Previous Names
Off-Peak Return	Two-way travel returning within one month.	Saver Return; White Saver
Super Off-Peak Return	Two-way travel returning within one month. Cheaper but more restricted than Off-Peak Return	Super Saver Return; Blue Saver
Off-Peak Day Return	Two-way travel returning the same day.	Cheap Day Return; Awayday
Super Off-Peak Day Return	Two-way travel returning the same day. Cheaper but more restricted than Off-Peak Day Return	
Off-Peak Single	One-way travel.	Saver Single

== Validity ==
The outward journey must be made on the date shown on the ticket, and the return journey can be made at any time within one calendar month from this date.

As the name implies, the ticket is generally intended for use outside peak times. Typically train operating companies prevent use of this type of ticket during key commuting hours of weekday mornings and early evening, especially for services beginning or terminating in London, at which times higher fares may be charged.

The times at which an Off-Peak fare is valid are set by the relevant train operator according to various factors, from levels of peak demand on the route in question to revenue maximisation. The specific details are given by referring to the two-digit 'validity code' assigned to the fare. The simplest apply a simple blanket time period to both outward and return journeys; more complex validity codes may apply different restrictions to outward and return journeys, or combine general validity periods with train-specific exemptions or exclusions.

Passengers are entitled to pause and resume their journey at any point and any number of times unless the ticket's validity code specifically prohibits this.

=== Validity examples ===
Validity Code	Time Restrictions	Break of Journey
2V	Not valid to depart before 0930 weekdays.	Allowed
8A	Valid any time.	Prohibited
EF	Valid after 1830 only.	Allowed
SK	Not valid on trains arriving in London before 1000 or departing London before 0845 weekdays.	Allowed return leg only
SM	Not valid on trains arriving in London before 1121 weekdays. Return unrestricted.	Allowed
TF	Not valid to depart before 0845 weekdays.	Allowed
W4	Not valid to depart before 0844 weekdays, except on 0828 Swindon to Westbury or 0836 Swindon to Cheltenham services.	Allowed

== Misuse ==
On routes where the chance of there being a ticket inspector is low, commuters have been known to buy one off-peak return in each direction and keep reusing the return portion until either the ticket gets inspected and stamped, or the month expires. The gradual introduction of ticket barriers across stations is removing this misuse as the ticket is retained by the barrier upon completing the journey.^{[although this is obviously true; there could be no found citations for this claim} ^{]}
