= Valley of Song =

1953 British film by Gilbert Gunn

- Original British quad poster
- Directed by: Gilbert Gunn
- Screenplay by: Phil Park; Cliff Gordon
- Based on: the play Choir Practice by Cliff Gordon
- Produced by: Vaughan N. Dean
- Starring: Mervyn Johns; Clifford Evans; Rachel Thomas
- Cinematography: Lionel Banes
- Edited by: Richard Best
- Music by: Robert Gill
- Production company: Associated British Picture Corporation
- Distributed by: Associated British-Pathé (UK)
- Release date: 13 April 1953 (UK)
- Running time: 72 minutes
- Country: United Kingdom
- Language: English

Valley of Song (U.S.: Men Are Children Twice) is a 1953 British second feature ('B') comedy drama film directed by Gilbert Gunn and starring Mervyn Johns, Clifford Evans, Maureen Swanson and the London Welsh Association Choral Society. It was written by Phil Park and Cliff Gordon based on Gordon's 1946 BBC radio play ''Choir Practice''. It marked the film debut of actress Rachel Roberts.

== Plot ==
Fierce rivalries flare to the surface in a small Welsh town, consisting mostly of the Davies and the Lloyds, over a coveted role in the local choir. Finally, the rival contraltos agree to share the part.

== Cast ==
- Mervyn Johns as Minister Griffiths
- Clifford Evans as Geraint Llewellyn
- Maureen Swanson as Olwen Davies
- John Fraser as Cliff Lloyd
- Rachel Thomas as Mrs. Lloyd
- Betty Cooper as Mrs. Davies
- Rachel Roberts as Bessie Lewis
- Hugh Pryse as Lloyd, undertaker
- Edward Evans as Davies
- Kenneth Williams as Lloyd the Haulage
- Alun Owen as Pritchard
- Ronald Lewis as uncredited role
- Desmond Llewelyn as Lloyd the schoolmaster

== Production ==
Filmed on location in Carmarthenshire in 1952, as well as at Elstree Studios, Valley of Song marks the first film appearance of Rachel Roberts and the first film credit of Kenneth Williams, both of whom worked together in Swansea repertory theatre in 1950 under the directorship of Clifford Evans, who also stars in the film. It was an early lead role for Maureen Swanson.

== Release ==
After the initial trade screening to cinema bookers on 26 February 1953, Valley of Song had four simultaneous World premieres in Wales, opening at cinemas in Cardiff, Newport, Merthyr Tydfil, and Swansea, all on 13 April 1953.

== Critical reception ==
The Monthly Film Bulletin wrote: "The slender story is treated with a light hand and the direction is swift and neat, the result being both refreshing and pleasing. This is not an ambitious film and its makers have realised its limitations. There is, fortunately, no suggestion of the music-hall conception of the Welsh. The photography is pleasant, the performances quite likeable, and some fine choral singing is used well but not too often."

Kine Weekly wrote: "Neat, witty and vocally effective regional comedy drama. ... The story is slight but the widely varied types, cleverly drawn by a hand-picked cast and skilfully deployed against authentic and picturesque backgrounds, score many laughs and make good and appropriate music. ... The picture takes a generous view ol the foibles of the Welsh and provides much genuine amusement without a hint of malice. Clifford Evans does a good job as the embarrassed baton-wielding Geraint, and the supporting players ... also bring their characters to life. The last named is particularly funny as the Davies' grandfather, who leaves his deathbed rather than be buried by a Lloyd! Rousing musical interludes smoothly link salient situations, while charming exteriors provide the finishing touch. "

In British Sound Films: The Studio Years 1928–1959 David Quinlan rated the film as "good", writing: "Extremely pleasant comedy, affectionately done."

Eye for Film noted "an enjoyable if somewhat low-key story which, at 72 minutes in length, would make for a suitably harmonious Sunday afternoon. From the whistle of the steam trains, to the film’s score, provided courtesy of the London Welsh Association Choral Society, Valley of Song is a pleasing if utterly unchallenging delight."
