= Ernie Wise =

English comedian (1925–1999)

Ernie Wise OBE
- Wise in 1960, in a screenshot for a British Pathé film
- Born: Ernest Wiseman; 27 November 1925; Leeds, West Riding of Yorkshire, England
- Died: 21 March 1999 (aged 73); Wexham, Buckinghamshire, England
- Occupations: Comedian; actor; entertainer; singer
- Years active: 1939–1995
- Employers: ATV; BBC; Thames Television
- Spouse: Doreen Blythe (m. 1953)

Ernest Wiseman (27 November 1925 – 21 March 1999), known by his stage name Ernie Wise, was an English comedian, best known as one half of the comedy duo Morecambe and Wise, who became a national institution on British television, especially for their Christmas specials.

== Early life and education ==
Ernest Wiseman, born in Leeds to Harry and Connie (née Wright) Wiseman, who married in St Thomas, Stanningley, was the eldest of five children, and changed his surname (as did his future partner) to go into show business.

He attended Thorpe Infant and Junior School, and then East Ardsley Boys' School, but entered the entertainment industry in 1933, appearing as an actor and singer in music hall. His father, Harry, a railway lamp man, was also a semi-professional singer, and they appeared together under the name "Bert Carson and his Little Wonder". An early clipping shows Bert Carson and the Little Wonder (then aged seven) taking part in an audition concert at the Harewood Working Men's Club in January 1933.

Wise (aged 10) appeared as a clown in the Nignog Revue at the Alhambra in Bradford in March 1936 and received a very good review. “His tap dancing and personality songs are in the best music hall style, and he astonished the house with his amazing boldness.” He started making solo appearances—singing, dancing, and telling jokes—in 1936, and in the autumn of 1938 he came to the attention of Bryan Michie, a leading juvenile talent spotter, who recommended him to the impresario Jack Hylton. Working with Hylton, Wise made his London debut in January 1939 at the Princes' Theatre in the "Band Waggon" stage show and received a very good review. He toured with Jack Hylton's stage show and made his television debut on the BBC London television Jack Hylton show on 15 March 1939.

== Performing career ==
In August 1940, Wise met Eric Morecambe, then known as Eric Bartholomew, when they were both in the touring Jack Hylton show "Youth takes a Bow".

Gradually, the duo formed a close friendship, and, in 1941, they began their comedy double act, which was to last until Morecambe's death in 1984. They made their debut together as "Bartholomew and Wise" on Thursday 28 August 1941, at the Liverpool Empire. A change of name followed in the autumn: after agreeing that the combination of their respective places of birth—Morecambe and Leeds—would make the act sound too much like a cheap day return, they settled on "Morecambe and Wise".

Both continued to work in theatre comedy during the Second World War until late 1943, when Morecambe went down a coal mine at Accrington (as a Bevin Boy) and Wise served in the Merchant Navy.

They reunited after the war and made their name in radio, transferring to television in April 1954—although their first TV series, Running Wild, was unsuccessful. In 1961, they gained their own series on ATV, which was a success and raised their profile. They transferred to the BBC in 1968. Over a period of more than twenty years, Morecambe and Wise had regular series with both ITV and BBC. In 1976, they were both appointed OBEs.

They also made three films together for the Rank Organisation.

Wise was commonly regarded as the straight man of the partnership, although his role gradually and subtly changed over the years. When Eddie Braben took over as their chief writer, he enriched Wise's persona by making him pompous and naive. Wise's character changed from being a conventional straight man into a pretentious and self-satisfied buffoon. Braben also made Wise a would-be writer; their BBC shows in the 1970s would regularly climax with an extended sketch, introduced by Wise as "a play what I wrote." It was in such a 'play' that Glenda Jackson, at the height of her career, was made to speak the line "All men are fools, and what makes them so is having beauty like what I have got."

== Later years ==
On 1 January 1985, he made what was publicised as the first public mobile phone call in the UK, from St Katharine Docks, East London, to Vodafone's Headquarters in Newbury, Berkshire. In 2015, it was reported that the actual first call was made a few hours earlier by Michael Harrison to his father, Sir Ernest Harrison, chairman of Vodafone.

Also in 1985, Wise appeared in an acting role in an episode of the American TV situation comedy Too Close for Comfort, playing an old friend of the main character, Henry, played by Ted Knight. It was Wise's only appearance in an American sitcom, and his last acting role on TV although he would continue to make TV appearances for the next decade, they were all on UK-based documentary, panel, or chat shows.

Wise appeared regularly as a panellist on the ITV revival of the popular panel show What's My Line? He was a guest several times on Countdown, had a gardening column in the News of the World newspaper and also appeared in several West End plays, including The Mystery Of Edwin Drood in 1987. He gave talks on cruises about his life and career. In 1989, he made a guest appearance in Rainbow Series 17, Episode 1276. He wrote his autobiography, Still on My Way to Hollywood, in 1990. He also was the subject on This Is Your Life, which was transmitted on Boxing Day that year. His 1992 Christmas single was a recommended retail release in Music Week. Wise was also an active and long-time participant in the Keep Britain Tidy campaign.

On 14 May 1994, the BBC aired the first of three episodes of a mini-series called Bring Me Sunshine, as a tribute to Eric Morecambe. It was hosted by Ben Elton, who is a huge fan of Morecambe and Wise, and who cites the duo as a big influence on his career. Those interviewed were John Thaw, Roy Castle (who was to die later that year), Diana Rigg, Hale and Pace, and Fry and Laurie. Wise was not asked to participate, the BBC saying that they did not want "too many talking heads". He was, however, recovering from a minor stroke which he had suffered in December 1993 which forced him to spend Christmas and New Year in hospital.

Wise suffered a second minor stroke in August 1995, and as a result, announced his retirement from show business on 27 November 1995, his 70th birthday. In August 1998, Wise was asked by the BBC to take part in Bring Me Sunshine: The Heart and Soul of Eric Morecambe, which was shown on 23 December that year. He had agreed to do so, but then his health had begun to deteriorate further. Earlier that month, Wise suffered two heart attacks within a week while on holiday, and had to undergo a triple heart bypass in Fort Lauderdale, Florida, on 22 January 1999. In March 1999, he was flown back to RAF Northolt, in London, by air ambulance and taken directly to the Nuffield Hospital at Wexham, Buckinghamshire.

Wise died from heart failure and a chest infection at the Nuffield Hospital, Wexham, near Slough, on the morning of 21 March 1999. He was 73 years old. His funeral was on 30 March at Slough Crematorium.

== Marriage ==
Wise married dancer Doreen Blythe (14 May 1930 – 14 April 2018) on 18 January 1953. They had no children, and remained married until his death.

== Legacy and statue ==
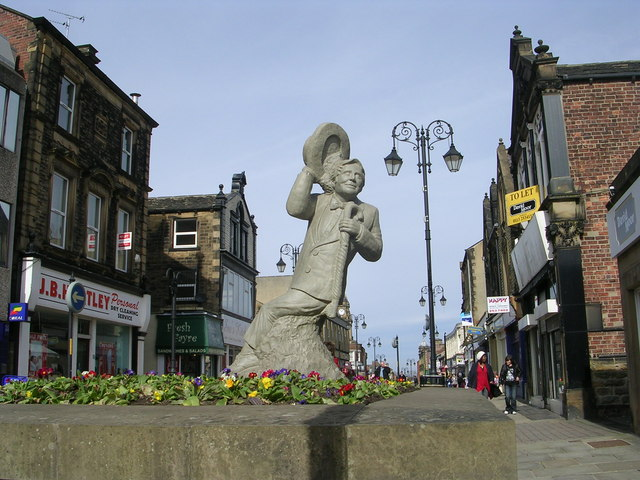
Statue of Ernie Wise in Morley, West Yorkshire

In March 2010, Wise's widow Doreen unveiled a statue of him in his home town of Morley, West Yorkshire, where he won a talent contest in 1936. The statue was commissioned by the Morley Murals Committee and funded by Doreen.
