= Titsey =

Village and parish in Surrey, England

Coordinates: 51.280°N 0.010°E

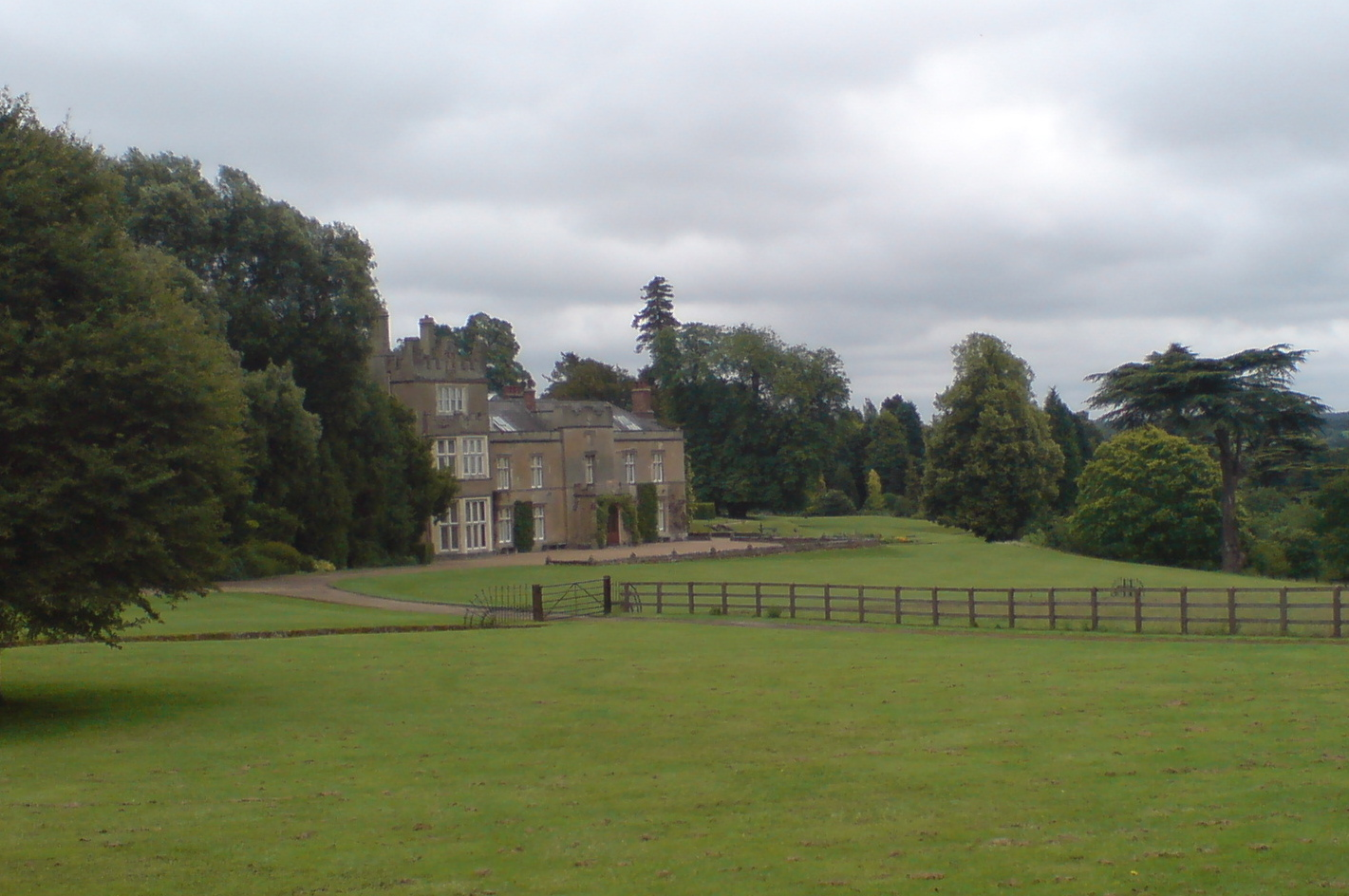
- Titsey Place is the surviving manor of Titsey but a stately home that is open for visitors and is charitably run

- Location within Surrey
- Area: 10.99 km^{2} (4.24 sq mi)
- Population: 272 (Civil Parish 2011)
  - Density: 25/km^{2} (65/sq mi)
- OS grid reference: TQ4157
  - London: 16 mi (26 km) NNE
- Civil parish: Titsey
- District: Tandridge
- Shire county: Surrey
- Region: South East
- Country: England
- Sovereign state: United Kingdom
- Post town: WESTERHAM
- Postcode district: TN16
- Post town: OXTED
- Postcode district: RH8
- Dialling code: 01959
- Police: Surrey
- Fire: Surrey
- Ambulance: South East Coast
- UK Parliament: East Surrey

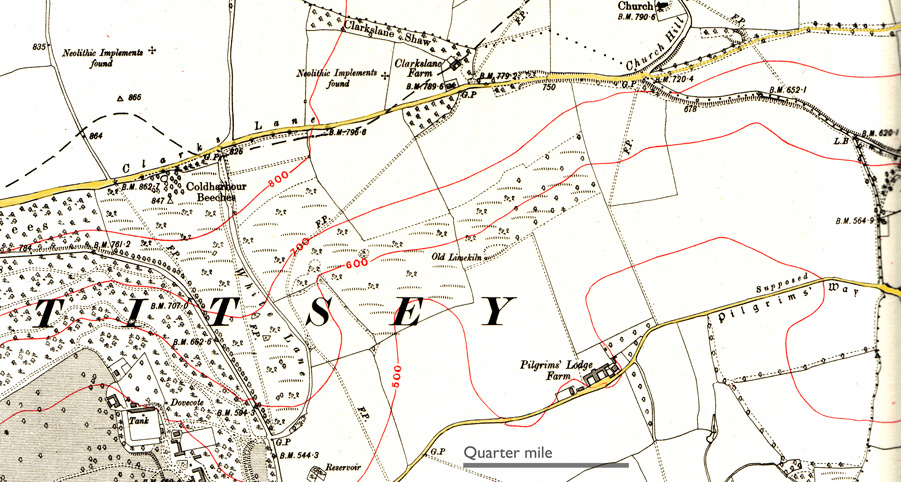
Titsey lies on the Pilgrims' Way, as shown in this Ordnance Survey map. The north–south road at the extreme right, and the "Clarkslane Shaw" field boundary top centre, lie on the track of a Roman road.

Titsey is a rural village and a civil parish on the North Downs almost wholly within the M25 London Orbital Motorway in the Tandridge District of Surrey, England.

In local government it forms the south-western part of the ward Tatsfield and Titsey and in national statistics approximates to output area E00157289. It has no railway stations however one is centred 1.5 miles (2.4 km) south-west, Oxted which also has the administrative centre of the district. Approximately half of it land is owned by a charity running the Titsey Place estate, with the remainder being a mixture of common and privately owned woodland and smallholdings.

== History ==
The village lay within the Tandridge hundred, of greatest use in the Anglo-Saxon Kingdom of England and it continues to form a parish in the church of England until its church became appropriated by that of Tatsfield.

The eastern parish boundary follows the London to Lewes Way Roman road which descends the escarpment of the North Downs here, crossing two important ancient east–west routes, the North Downs ridgeway and the Pilgrims Way on the lower slopes.

Titsey appears in Domesday Book of 1086 as a village: Ticesei held by Haimo the Sheriff (of Kent) when its assets were: 2 hides; 1 church, 9 ploughs, pasture worth every seventh hog of the villeins. It rendered £11 per year to its feudal system overlords.

The parish church of St James the Greater dates from 1861 and is on the site of an earlier church built in 1776. That in turn replaced a much older church, dating from the 14th century. Some of the memorials to the Gresham family date from the 16th and 17th centuries. There is a 19th century side chapel with memorials to the Leveson-Gower family.

Until the early 20th century, the local economy was entirely agricultural.

In 1929, the BBC established its radio signals receiving station in the parish of Titsey, though the facility was named after the nearby village of Tatsfield. The station's masts and shortwave aerials were a prominent local landmark. The station closed in 1974 when its work was merged with that of BBC Monitoring's receiving station at Crowsley Park in South Oxfordshire. Some derelict remains of the BBC station can still be seen.

== Demography and housing ==
2011 Census Homes
Output area	Detached	Semi-detached	Terraced	Flats and apartments	Caravans/temporary/mobile homes/houseboats	Shared between households
E00157289	67	37	2	2	0	0

The average level of accommodation in the region composed of detached houses was 28%, the average that was apartments was 22.6%.

2011 Census Households
Output area	Population	Households	% Owned outright	% Owned with a loan	hectares
E00157289	272	108	36.1	23.1	1,099

The proportion of households who owned their home outright compares to the regional average of 35.1%. The proportion who owned their home with a loan compares to the regional average of 32.5%. The remaining % is made up of rented dwellings (plus a negligible % of households living rent-free).

In 2011 the ward of the United Kingdom, Tatsfield and Titsey, almost twice its size, had 1,816 inhabitants

== Local government ==
The (civil) parish council clerk is David Innes.

== Geography ==
Titsey covers a long tract which reaches up the southern escarpment of the North Downs, specifically to the highest point of the range, Botley Hill, which is in the parish. The north has altitude of around 230 metres (750 ft) where the North Downs Way passes through the parish. Springs in Titsey, rising at the foot of the chalk scarp of the North Downs, are the source of the River Eden.

It is a dispersed settlement bordering Farleigh to the north and the London Borough of Bromley to the north-east. Biggin Hill is to the north-east, across the village centre of Tatsfield. The boundary with Kent is centred 1.5 miles (2.4 km) east. Titsey has two post towns depending on exact location.

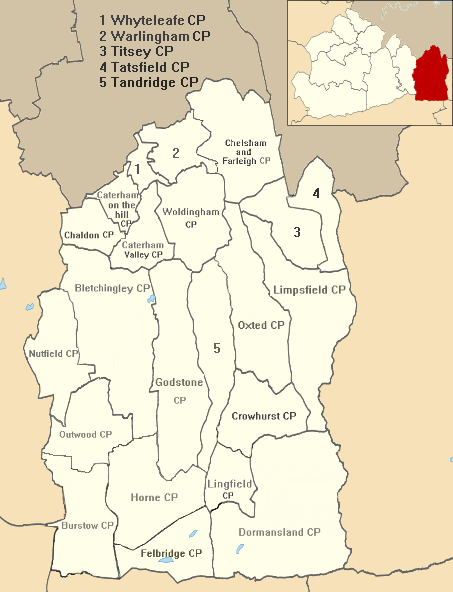
Map showing the position of Titsey in Tandridge
