= Tatsfield =

Village and parish in Surrey, England

Coordinates: 51.299°N 0.031°E

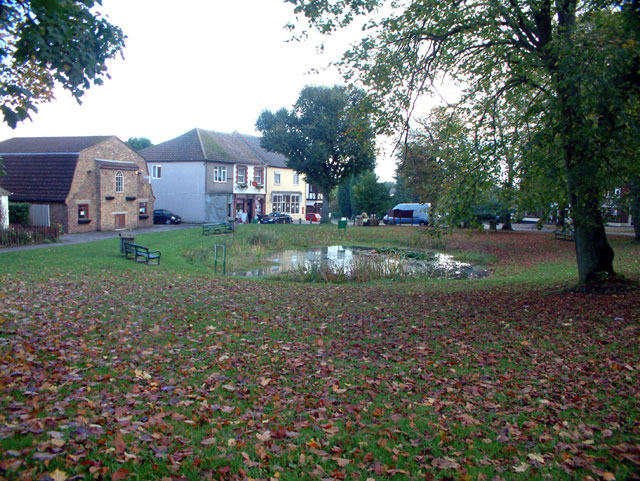
- Tatsfield village centre

- Location within Surrey
- Area: 13.36 km^{2} (5.16 sq mi)
- Population: 1,863 (Civil Parish 2011)
  - Density: 139/km^{2} (360/sq mi)
- OS grid reference: TQ4157
  - London: 16 miles (26 km)
- Civil parish: Tatsfield
- District: Tandridge
- Shire county: Surrey
- Region: South East
- Country: England
- Sovereign state: United Kingdom
- Post town: WESTERHAM
- Postcode district: TN16
- Dialling code: 01959
- Police: Surrey
- Fire: Surrey
- Ambulance: South East Coast
- UK Parliament: East Surrey

Tatsfield is a village and civil parish in the Tandridge District of Surrey, England. It is located 3.3 miles north west of Westerham and 3.9 miles north east of Oxted, and is adjacent to the Surrey border with both Greater London and Kent.

== Geography ==
The village itself is on the North Downs with its centre near its highest point, at an altitude of around 230 metres (750 ft) north of the ridge of the North Downs where the North Downs Way passes through the parish. The 'village' area is in a small salient of Surrey into the London Borough of Bromley, Greater London (to the west, north and east). Biggin Hill is immediately to the north. The boundary with Kent is less than 1/2 mile to the east. Tatsfield is covered by the Westerham post town, meaning Tatsfield's postal county was Kent. Since 1996, the postal county has not been required in postal addresses.

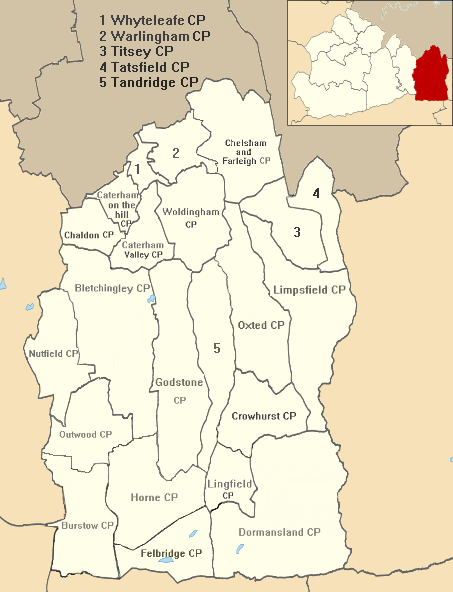
Map showing the position of Tatsfield in Tandridge

== Etymology ==
The origin of the village name is uncertain. The English Place Name Society suggests it is derived from 'a field or open land belonging to one Tatol' (possibly a nickname meaning the lively one). The word 'field' denotes a clearing in The Weald, a main Anglo-Saxon forest. An alternative explanation is that the earliest community began on the hill with church, manor house and rectory. The name could therefore derive from Totehylefelde – meaning a look-out place in a clearing. The appearance of Tot-hyl in a place name is a reference to a watch hill and quite possibly to the whole system of Anglo-Saxon civil defence involving beacons, watch hill and army roads. Tatsfield appears in the Domesday Book of 1086 as Tatelefelle.

== History ==
=== Tatsfield ===
In Anglo-Saxon England, Tatsfield lay within Tandridge hundred. In 1086 it was held by Anschitill (Ansketel) de Ros from the Bishop of Bayeux. Its Domesday assets were: ½ hide. It had 2 ploughs. It rendered 60 shillings (£3) to its feudal overlords per year.

During the mid 14th century the manor was held by Rhodri ap Gruffudd, brother of the last native Prince of Wales, and his descendants. Thomas Retherick's heir was his son Owen, also called 'de Gales' (of Wales), who in 1366, during the war with France, left England to join the king's enemies in that country, and before going likewise released all his right in the reversion of the manor to Roger de Stanyngden and his heirs. Thus in 1392 a grant of the manor of Tatsfield, which was alleged to have been long-concealed, was made by the Crown to John Maudelyn.

In 1416–17 John de Stanyngden or Stalkynden conveyed his rights in the manor to John Uvedale. William Uvedale inherited on his father's death in 1616. He conveyed the manor to a later Sir John Gresham (see Gresham baronets), before passing under his nephew, Marmaduke Gresham's will. From his son and co-heir, Sir Isaac Shard acquired it in 1717. 1759 Isaac Pacatus Shard wanted a sale; his heir William put it up for sale with three farms containing 500 acres (200 ha) let at £190 a year and 40 acres (16 ha) of wood. It was acquired via a Mr Butler by the last in the line of Greshams (see Calcotts below). The ancient manor-house, called Tatsfield Court Lodge, stood near the church and was pulled down by this last Baronet, Sir John before his death in 1801, and a new house was built at the foot of the hill, near the Pilgrims' Way.

==== Calcotts ====
Calcotts was a capital mansion belonging to the collegiate church of Lingfield at the dissolution of the monasteries worth £3 6s. 8d a year. On the surrender of its master, Edward Colepeper, LL.D., in 1544, the college and its possessions were granted by the king to Thomas Cawarden, a gentleman of the Privy Chamber. In 1560 its heir sold it to, William Lord Howard of Effingham, who sold it in 1564 to Sir Richard Sackville, kt. The latter died on 20 April 1566 and was succeeded by his son Thomas Sackville, Lord Buckhurst. On 22 June 1575 the latter sold Calcotts with associated Paynters in Westerham to Walter Henley. The Henleys kept it until 1598, when Richard Henley sold it to Thomas Gresham of Limpsfield for £690 (equivalent to £153,861 in 2025) yet reserving to himself land called Eades Croft, on Westmore Green, Tatsfield, which was then in the tenure of Joan Burstow, widow. In 1801 their senior descendant being a daughter, led to its passage to a junior branch of the Leveson-Gowers (not the Dukes of Sutherland) until parted with during the 20th century.

==== Lovestead ====
Lovested Down or Lusted was a large estate, with mansion in Cudham, seen in a rental of Titsey dated 19 November 1401, of Merton Priory. At the dissolution of the monasteries the priory held wood to the value of 4s. a year here. In 1553 Sir John Gresham devised to his son William, after the death of his wife Katherine, "the farm in Surrey and Kent where Steven of Lusted dwelt", for which he paid £10 a year. Sir Marmaduke Gresham, by his will dated 14 January 1696, gave Lusted to his son Charles and daughter Alice Gresham. It was owned in 1891 by Jeremiah Dummett.

==== Other land ====
The other land was common land even in 1912.

=== 20th century ===
In 1929, the BBC established its Tatsfield Receiving Station just outside the village in fields in the parish of Titsey, and its masts and shortwave aerials were a prominent local landmark. The station closed in 1974 when its work was merged with that of BBC Monitoring's receiving station at Crowsley Park in South Oxfordshire. Some derelict remains of the BBC station can still be seen.

On 10 December 1935 a Savoia-Marchetti S.73 of Belgian airline SABENA crashed at Tatsfield, killing all eleven on board. At the time, it was Britain's worst air crash.

=== Ancient roads ===
A number of ancient routes cross the parish. The best studied is the London to Lewes Way west of the village centre. It was constructed about 100 AD between the mentioned towns/settlements 44 miles (71 km). (Part of this Roman road forms the county boundary here, with Greater London to its east and another part of Surrey to the west.) One other trackway appears also to be of importance: this is the Biggin Hill to Titsey route, which is straight in places, and as is pointed out in the Victoria County History (1912) provides a direct connection between the Roman road at the entrance to the village and the two villa sites in Titsey Park, suggesting a possible Roman origin.

=== TV appearances ===
Tatsfield was used as the filming location for Jo Hamilton's Post Office in ITV's "Mr Bates vs. the Post Office" in 2023.

== Transport ==
=== Rail ===
The nearest National Rail station is Oxted, located 3.9 miles away.

=== Buses ===
Tatsfield is served by London Buses route 464 and Southdown PSV route 595, connecting it with places including Biggin Hill, New Addington, Oxted & Westerham.

== Amenities ==
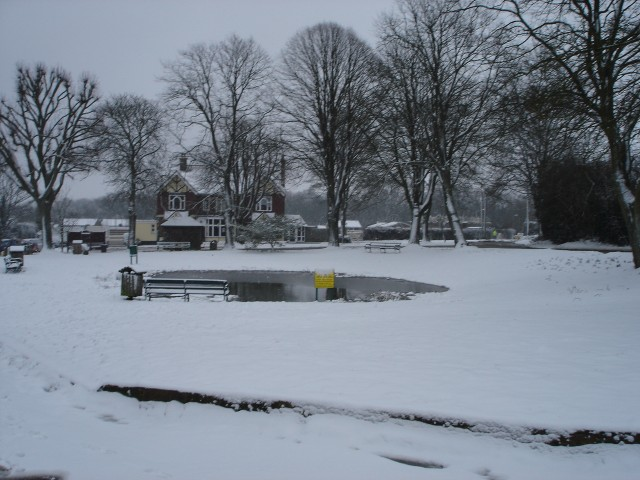
Tatsfield in the snow

There is a shop, the Bakery restaurant, the Old Ship pub, and the Tatsfield Village Club. St. Mary's Church, which for many years has played host to a dual congregation of Roman Catholics and Anglicans, sits atop the North Downs. The Village Hall is the focal point for a number of clubs and societies.

The village school moved to a new site next to the Village Hall in 2010.

A tourist attraction for four decades was Beaver Water World, a zoo which, in addition to beavers, exhibited reptiles and birds. Until its death in 2006, the most famous of the cold-blooded residents was an alligator called Big Boy, which appeared in the James Bond film Live and Let Die. Beaver Water World closed in December 2017.

== Twin town ==
Tatsfield is twinned with Vern-d'Anjou in France.

== Demography and housing ==
The 2011 census figures for Tatsfield were also coupled with Titsey, but the 2013 Tatsfield Appraisal examined the figures in great detail. One of the six output areas for the Tatsfield and Titsey ward covered Titsey parish, so it was possible to calculate figures for the Tatsfield part of that area more confidently than using the previous census.

The civil parish's appraisal report, published in 2014, gave the following figures:

Scope of state-published units
Record	Homes (2013)	Homes (2003 or as stated)
UK Census		727 (2011)
Council Tax records	737	694
Parish Magazine past/present delivery addresses	737	683
Electoral register	682	644 in 2001, 671 in 1999

The parish council therefore counted 737 homes in its report and noted that no homes had been demolished since 2011 so at least 10 dwellings had been added to Tatsfield since the census date in 2011.

Using the tax records, the number of dwellings grew by approximately 6% (2003-2013. The population of the village, derived from the 2011 census, and adjusted for the additional 10 houses is a published estimate of 1,787 (2013). The male/female proportions are approximately equal. Average household size has decreased over the past 20 years although on average the Tatsfield household is larger than in the rest of England.

=== Historic figures ===
Together with wholly rural Titsey, 1,816 residents were counted in the 2001 census, distributed over 691 households. in Tatsfield and Titsey, one of the wards of the United Kingdom.

== Notable people ==
- Donald Maclean (d.1983), diplomat who defected to the USSR in May 1951
- Thomas Streatfeild (d.1848), antiquarian and Anglican cleric
- John Surtees (d. 2017), motorcyclist and racing driver
- Ronald Hines {d. 2017}, television actor
- David Scarboro (d.1988), actor in EastEnders; buried at St Mary's Tatsfield
- Jay Aston, singer of Bucks Fizz

== Politics ==
Tatsfield is in the East Surrey constituency. The MP is Claire Coutinho who succeed Sam Gyimah.

Tatsfield and Titsey 2023
Party	Candidate	Votes	%	±%
Independent	Martin Allen*	371		
Conservative	Harry Millar	124		
Labour	Nathan Charles-Manning	48		
Majority				
Turnout			27.0	
Independent hold		Swing		

Tatsfield and Titsey 2019
Party	Candidate	Votes	%	±%
Independent	Martin Allen*	316	58.0	▼8.6
Conservative	Alex Standen	132	24.2	▼5.0
UKIP	Christopher Dean	63	11.6	N/A
Labour	Sarah Stewart	34	6.2	▲2.0
Majority		184	33.6	
Turnout		545	36.6	
Independent hold		Swing		

Tatsfield and Titsey 2015 (1)
Party	Candidate	Votes	%	±%
Independent	Martin Allen	776	66.6	N/A
Conservative	Tony Roberts	339	29.2	N/A
Labour	Christina Vogt	49	4.2	N/A
Majority		437		
Turnout		1,164		
Independent hold		Swing		

Tatsfield and Titsey 2011 (1)
Party	Candidate	Votes	%	±%
Independent	Bob David	Unopposed		
Majority		N/A		
Turnout		N/A		
Independent hold		Swing		

Tatsfield and Titsey 2007 (1)
Party	Candidate	Votes	%	±%
Independent	Bob David	580	70.6	▲13.9
Conservative	Giles Hawkes	213	25.9	▼16.6
UKIP	Kevin Alderton	31	3.5	N/A
Majority		367	44.7	+30.5
Turnout		822	57.0	−7.0
Independent hold		Swing		

Tatsfield and Titsey 2003 (1)
Party	Candidate	Votes	%	±%
Independent	Bob David	524	56.7	▲22.8
Conservative	Christina Fry	393	42.5	▼10.6
Liberal Democrats	Richard Mascall	7	0.8	▼8.3
Majority		131	14.2	
Turnout		924	64.0	
Independent gain from Conservative		Swing		

== See also ==
- List of places of worship in Tandridge (district)
