= Tatsfield Receiving Station =

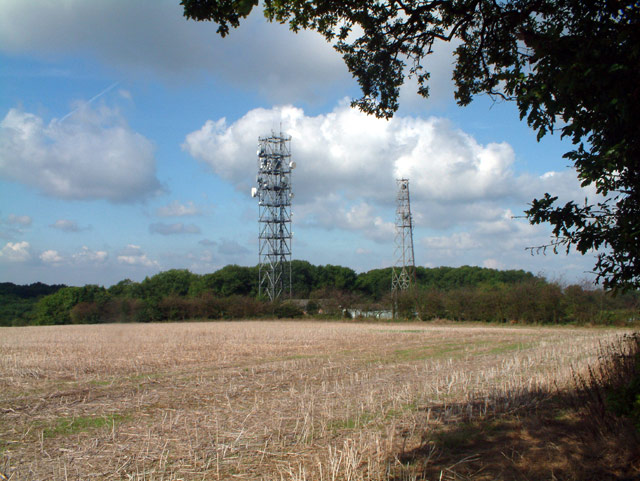
- The site in September 2005

- Location within Surrey
- Former names: BBC Station, Tatsfield

General information
- Type: Radio receiving station
- Location: Surrey
- Coordinates: 51.29°N 0.01°E
- Elevation: 255 m (837 ft)
- Current tenants: Vacated
- Completed: September 1929
- Client: BBC

The Tatsfield Receiving Station – known formally as the BBC Engineering Measurement and Receiving Station – was a radio broadcasting signals-receiving and frequency-measuring facility operated by the British Broadcasting Corporation (BBC) on the North Downs just south of London in the United Kingdom.

The station was in operation between 1929 and 1974.

== Functions ==
The Tatsfield station's work included:

- Measuring to high degrees of accuracy the frequencies of BBC radio and TV transmitters. It is important that broadcast transmitters remain on their assigned frequency in order to avoid interfering with other users of the radio spectrum. A particularly high level of frequency stability is required in the case of several transmitters carrying the same programme on a single frequency in a synchronised network.
- Measuring the frequencies of foreign transmitters, exchanging such information with similar receiving stations abroad, in cooperation initially with the International Broadcasting Union (IBU) and from 1950 with its successor organisation, the European Broadcasting Union (EBU).
- Tracking the occupancy of the short wave, medium wave (AM), long wave and FM radio bands.
- Watching for accidental interference and deliberate jamming to BBC transmissions.
- Receiving foreign broadcasts to be relayed by the BBC. Tatsfield formed an important link in the relaying of broadcasts by the Voice of America (VOA). Shortwave broadcasts from VOA transmitters in the USA were received at Tatsfield and fed to the BBC transmitting station at Woofferton to be rebroadcast to their target audiences in Europe and the Soviet Union.
- Tatsfield also picked up broadcasts from foreign stations to be used in the BBC's own programmes.

== Tatsfield and BBC Monitoring ==
The Tatsfield station played a different – though often overlapping and cooperative – role to that of BBC Monitoring, which (from 1939) received many of the same signals, but for the purposes of gathering news and open-source intelligence, from bases first at Wood Norton and then from 1943 at Caversham Park.

In short, Tatsfield's work was technical monitoring while that of BBC Monitoring, undertaken in partnership with the US government's Foreign Broadcast Information Service (FBIS), was content monitoring.

== Location ==
The station was in the parish of Titsey near the larger village of Tatsfield in the county of Surrey, just outside Greater London. It was about 15 miles south-southeast of central London.

On Ordnance Survey maps it was listed as WT Sta (wireless station). It was off the B269 road, north-east of the roundabout with the B2024, to the east of Pitchers Wood, now around one mile north of the M25 motorway.

== History ==
The BBC set up its first receiving station at Keston in Kent (now in the London Borough of Bromley) in 1925, measuring the frequencies of BBC and foreign transmitters and picking up continental broadcasts to be relayed by the BBC.

The work of the Keston station was moved the short distance to the new Tatsfield facility in 1929, initially with a staff of three. The station expanded considerably during the 1930s and by the start of the Second World War had a staff of 20.

The war saw a further expansion in activities and staff. The number of personnel on the official BBC "establishment" for Tatsfield rose to 72 by 1945, though many of these were seconded to work at BBC Monitoring for the duration of the conflict.

Between July and November 1944 all of Tatsfield's staff and equipment were evacuated to BBC Monitoring's outstation at Crowsley Park in South Oxfordshire because of the threat from V-1 flying bombs as Tatsfield lay on their flight path between northern France and London.

Tatsfield's work continued during the Cold War. Signals from Sputnik 1 were received at Tatsfield in October 1957, and the station also monitored transmissions from subsequent Soviet space missions. In July 1958 it picked up signals from the US Explorer 4 satellite.

== Closure ==
The Tatsfield station closed in 1974. Its functions were transferred to the Crowsley Park facility, which was expanded and renamed the BBC Receiving Station to mark the combination of roles.

Some derelict remains of the Tatsfield station can still be seen at its former site.
