= Robin Davies =

Welsh actor (1954–2010)

- Born: Robert Richard Davies; 16 January 1954; Tywyn, Merionethshire, Wales
- Died: 22 February 2010 (aged 56); Norwich, Norfolk
- Years active: 1965–2010

Robert Richard "Robin" Davies (16 January 1954 – 22 February 2010) was a Welsh television and film actor.

== Early life ==
Robert Richard Davies was born 16 January 1954 in Tywyn, Wales and spent part of his childhood living in Willesden where he attended Gladstone Park School Primary School. He trained to be an actor at the Aida Foster Theatre School.

== Career ==
He was a child actor and made his television debut in the BBC soap opera The Newcomers. He was also in The Magnificent Six and a Half, which went on to become the children's show Here Come the Double Deckers. He is perhaps best known for two of his earliest TV roles. In 1970 he played the role of Carrot in Richard Carpenter's children's fantasy Catweazle, for which he had to dye his hair red.

The following year, Davies appeared as Simon Harrison in the ITV sitcom ...And Mother Makes Three. The series starred Wendy Craig as a recently widowed mother and Davies played one of her two teenage sons, a role he reprised in the sequel ...And Mother Makes Five. His film credits included the Lindsay Anderson films If.... (1968), The Blood on Satan's Claw (1971) and Britannia Hospital (1982), and a cameo in Shakespeare in Love (1998). He also had roles in Doomwatch, Warship, The Saturday Party, Forget Me Not Lane, The Country Party, A Moment in Time and Spearhead.

== Personal life ==
He married Venetia Vivian in 1982 and they had three children: India, Alice and Will.

He died in Norwich, Norfolk on 22 February 2010 of lung cancer, and was interred at St Peter's Church, Walsingham, Norfolk, on 1 March 2010.

== Filmography ==
Year	Title	Role	Notes
1968	If....	Machin: Juniors	
1968–1969	The Magnificent Six and ½	Steve	Six short films (Series 2)
1970	Catweazle	Edward Bennet, nicknamed Carrot	TV series
1971	Doomwatch	Malcolm Priestland	TV series (Series 2, Episode 14: The Logicians)
1971	The Blood on Satan's Claw	Mark Vespers	
1971–1973	...And Mother Makes Three	Simon Harrison	TV series
1973	Warship	Ord. Jones	TV series
1974–1976	...And Mother Makes Five	Simon Redway	TV series
1978–1981	Spearhead	Corporal Box	TV series
1979	A Moment in Time	Splodge	TV mini-series
1979	Secret Army	Ronnie Whale	TV series (Series 3, Episode 4: A Safe Place)
1982	Britannia Hospital	Adrian	
1989	Split Ends	Herbie	TV series
1998	Shakespeare in Love	Master Plum	(final film role)
