= Richard Coleman =

British actor (1930–2008)

- Born: Ronald Coleman; 20 January 1930; Peckham, London, England
- Died: 16 December 2008 (aged 78); France
- Spouse: Peggy Sinclair

Richard Coleman (20 January 1930 – 16 December 2008) was a British film, television and stage actor.

== Early life ==
Richard Coleman was born Ronald Coleman in Peckham, London in 1930. He was educated at Wilson's Grammar School, Peckham. After three years' National Service in the R.A.F., he worked as a salesman in a West End gentleman's outfitters. While there he became interested in amateur dramatics, joining "The Taverners", a group which visited local inns and public houses, giving performances of Shakespeare. Bob and Frances Fish, who ran The Taverners, recognised Coleman's potential and entered him in 1951 for the Leverhulme Scholarship to RADA, which he won. To make ends meet during the Academy's vacations, he was forced to do a variety of jobs, including working on the Thames River Bus and selling razors. He graduated from RADA in 1953 with the Principal’s Medal. He adopted the stage name Richard Coleman, to avoid confusion with the film star Ronald Colman. He then spent two years with the Worthing Repertory Company, appearing in many plays.

== Career ==
=== Theatre ===
Coleman made his professional acting debut in 1955, playing Albert Tufnell, A.B., in the stage adaptation of Sailor Beware! starring Peggy Mount, which opened in The Strand Theatre in London's West End on Wednesday 16 February 1955 and ran for 1231 performances. He also appeared in The World of Suzie Wong, The Big Killing, A Murder is Announced, The Mousetrap and had three years from 1968-70 playing both Andrew Hunter and Robert Danvers in the London West End stage version of There's a Girl in My Soup. Later in his career Coleman became a theatre producer and, among other ventures, toured Canada in 1976 with a well-received production of "Absurd Person Singular", starring John Thaw.

A full list of the plays in which Coleman appeared is:

1955-58 Sailor, Beware! (Albert Tufnell, A.B.)

1959 Suzie Wong (Ben Jeffcoat)

1962 The Big Killing

1968-70 There's A Girl in My Soup (Andrew Hunter and Robert Danvers)

1975 How It Can Ruin Your Health

1975 Cheaper by the Dozen

1976 Absurd Person Singular (Tour of Canada)

1976 The Roaring Forties (George)

1977 The Chiltern Hundreds (Beecham)

1977 A Murder is Announced

1978 Suddenly At Home (Glenn Howard)

1979 An Ideal Husband (Sir Robert Chiltern)

1982 Public Relations

1982 In Praise of Love.

He also appeared in: Lady Windermere's Fan (Lord Windermere), Staircase (Charles Dyer), The Mousetrap, Two and Two Make Sex and Not Now Darling.

=== Television ===
He played David Redway in the situation comedy ...And Mother Makes Three (1972-3), and its sequel ...And Mother Makes Five (1974-6), opposite Wendy Craig. Other television roles included Nick Allardyce in The Adventures of Ben Gunn (1958), Alan-a-Dale in The Adventures of Robin Hood (1958–60), and Jack Royston in the short lived Anglia Television soap opera Weavers Green (1966). Coleman also made guest appearances in television series such as Dixon of Dock Green, No Hiding Place, Emergency Ward 10, Sergeant Cork, Zero One, The Avengers, Z-Cars, Thriller (A Coffin for the Bride), Robin's Nest, Surgical Spirit, Champion House, "Letters From The Dead", Whodunnit? (Worth Dying For) (1975), and Virtual Murder. He was a panellist on "Whose Baby?" (1973) in all 13 episodes of the first series and all 14 episodes of the second series.

=== Film ===
Coleman appeared in a number films including The Dam Busters (1955), Yangtse Incident (1957), Girls at Sea (1958), The Navy Lark (1959), Ben-Hur (1959), Hell is a City (1960), The Day The Earth Caught Fire (1961), 80,000 Suspects (1963), Rotten to the Core (1965) Naked Evil (1966) and Who Dares Wins (1982). He also had a cameo role in the film 10 Rillington Place (1971) as the police constable who arrests the murderer John Christie.

== Personal life ==
Coleman was married to the actress Peggy Sinclair. They had two daughters. At the end of the 1980s they went to live in rural France, where he indulged his lifelong love of dogs, good food and fine wine. He died from cancer in France on 16 December 2008, aged 78.

== Filmography ==
=== Film ===
Year	Title	Role	Notes
1955	The Dam Busters	RAF Officer	Uncredited
1957	Yangtse Incident: The Story of H.M.S. Amethyst	Lt. Cmdr. Skinner	
1958	Girls at Sea	Capt. Robert 'Bobby' Randall	
1959	Ben-Hur	Metellus	Uncredited
1959	The Navy Lark	Lt. Bates R.N.	Uncredited
1960	Hell Is a City	Detective in Station	Uncredited
1961	The Day the Earth Caught Fire	Partner of Stenning's divorced wife	Uncredited
1963	80,000 Suspects	Scott James	Uncredited
1965	Rotten to the Core	Inspector Hewlett	Uncredited
1966	Naked Evil	Inspector Hollis	
1967	Countdown to Danger	Captain Wright	Children's Film Foundation
1971	10 Rillington Place	Police Constable #4	
1972	Hide and Seek	Police Sergeant	Children's Film Foundation
1981	The Comoedia	Virgilio	
1982	Who Dares Wins	Mr. Martin	

=== Television ===
Year	Title	Role	Notes
1958	The Adventures of Ben Gunn	Nick Allardyce	5 episodes
1959-1960	The Adventures of Robin Hood	Alan-a-Dale	4 episodes
1961	Plateau of Fear	Ralph Morton	3 episodes
1963	Zero One	Pilot	Episode: "Hurricane"
1963	Comedy Playhouse	Charles Pratt	Episode: "On the Knocker"
1963-1964	Dixon of Dock Green	Mr. Holdsworth / Mr. Dykes	2 episodes
1964	Compact	Mike Fuller	3 episodes
1964-1965	No Hiding Place	Detective Sergeant Anstey / Pat Jenkins	2 episodes
1964-1965	Marriage Lines	Dr. Harrison	2 episodes
1964-1966	Redcap	Corporal Geott / Corporal Edge	2 episodes
1965	The Man in Room 17	Jaraslav Brunewski	Episode: "The Seat of Power"
1965	Theatre 625	1st Policeman	Episode: "Yob and Nabob"
1966	The Avengers	Squadron Leader Freddy	Episode: "The Danger Makers"
1966	Weavers Green	Jack Royston	7 episodes
1966	Sergeant Cork	PC Portello	Episode: "The Case of the Silent Policeman"
1967	Room at the Bottom	Dillington	1 episode
1967	Emergency Ward 10	James Fellowes	Episode: "There's None So Blind"
1967	ITV Playhouse	Detective Inspector Sullivan	Episode: "The Confession"
1967-1968	Champion House	Kevin Flinders	2 episodes
1971	That's Your Funeral	Horatio	Episode: "A Touch of Violet"
1972-1973	...And Mother Makes Three	David Redway	13 episodes
1973	Z-Cars	Corder	Episode: "Defection"
1973	CBS Children's Film Festival	Captain Wright	Episode: "Countdown to Danger"
1974	Thriller	Weston	Episode: "A Coffin for the Bride"
1974	The Capone Investment	Duncan Hall	4 episodes
1974-1976	...And Mother Makes Five	David Redway	26 episodes
1975	Whodunnit?	Henry Johnson	Episode: "Worth Dying For"
1977	George & Mildred	Charles Newman	Episode: "All Around the Clock"
1978	Wings	Samuel Triggers	Episode: "The Price"
1979	Robin's Nest	Fanthorpe	Episode: "Sorry Partner"
1981	Private Schulz	Policeman	1 episode
1990	She-Wolf of London	PC Leary	Episode: "The Bogman of Letchmoor Heath"
1991	Surgical Spirit	Charles Mackland Smith	Episode: "Making News"
1992	Virtual Murder	Chief Inspector Trusscott	Episode: "A Bone to Pick"
