= Peggy Sinclair =

English actress

- Born: Maureen N. Sinclair
- Years active: 1964–1996
- Spouse: Richard Coleman

Peggy Sinclair is an English actress. She was married to the actor Richard Coleman.

== Credits ==
=== Television ===
Year	Title	Role	Notes
1964	Armchair Theatre	WRAF Sgt. Padmore	
1965	Dixon of Dock Green	Sylvia Howard	
1965-1966	The Power Game	Jane Redvers	2 episodes
1966	BBC Play of the Month	Stewardess	
1967	Haunted	Mrs. Glendower	
1967-1969	Softly, Softly	PW Det. Sgt. Barbara Allin	38 episodes
1971	Z-Cars	Shirley Treece	2 episodes
1972	...And Mother Makes Three	Margaret	
1972-1973	General Hospital	Sister Ellen Chapman	21 episodes
1974	Thriller	Mrs. Faversham	
1975	Within These Walls	Mrs. Swales	
1975	Angels	Miss King	2 episodes
1977	Leap in the Dark	Mrs. Verrall	
1977	George and Mildred	Mrs. Eastham	
1978	Secret Army	Sister Louise	
1978-1979	Grange Hill	Mrs. Preston	3 episodes
1979	BBC2 Play of the Week	Matron	
1979	Shoestring	Landlady	
1980	All Creatures Great and Small	Mrs. Holroyd	
1981	Juliet Bravo	Mrs. Collins	
1982–1983	Let There Be Love	Louise	5 episodes
1984	Hammer House of Mystery and Suspense	Matron	
1983–1984	Don't Wait Up	Louise	8 episodes
1993	The Bill	First Woman	
1996	Accused	Jocelyn Halliday	4 episodes

Peggy also appears uncredited as a Children's Panellist in "And Mother Makes Five" in the episode "Double Standards".

=== Film ===
Year	Title	Role
1968	Escape from the Sea	Mrs. Oakley
1975	Permission to Kill	Lily
