= A Moment in Time =

A Moment in Time may refer to:

- A Moment in Time (album), an album by Lorrie Morgan
- A Moment in Time, an album by reggae artist Beres Hammond
- A Moment in Time (novel), 1964 by H. E. Bates
- A Moment in Time (film), a 2013 Filipino romantic drama film

== See also ==
- One Moment in Time (disambiguation)
