= Not in Front of the Children (TV series) =

British TV sitcom (1967–1970)

- Genre: Sitcom
- Created by: Richard Waring
- Starring: Wendy Craig; Paul Daneman (series 1); Ronald Hines (series 2-4)
- Country of origin: United Kingdom
- No. of series: 4
- No. of episodes: 39 (31 missing)

Production
- Running time: 30 minutes

Original release
- Network: BBC1
- Release: 26 May 1967 – 9 January 1970

Not in Front of the Children is a BBC Television sitcom, which ran for four series from 1967 to 1970.

It starred Wendy Craig as Jennifer Corner, a rather scatterbrained middle-class housewife. For her role she received the 1969 British Academy Television Award for Best Actress. Her husband Henry was a school art teacher, played by Paul Daneman in the Comedy Playhouse pilot "House in a Tree" and the first series, and Ronald Hines subsequently. They had three children, a boy in his early teens (played by Hugo Keith-Johnston) and two girls who were slightly younger (played by Roberta Tovey and then Verina Greenlaw, and Jill Riddick). Charlotte Mitchell played her friend Mary.

In later series, she had a baby, and they moved from the London suburb of Battersea to the country.

It is significant mainly as Wendy Craig's first role as a scatty housewife; she played similar roles in several other series over the next 15 years.

== Surviving episodes ==
- Series 1
  - Episode 3: "The Word" (8 September 1967)
- Series 2
  - Episode 2: "Religious Revival" (1 March 1968)
  - Episode 5: "The Iron Hand" (22 March 1968)
  - Episode 6: "The George Washington Complex" (29 March 1968)
  - Episode 7: "Home Chat" (5 April 1968)
  - Episode 8: "Change of Policy" (12 April 1968)
- Series 4
  - Episode 4: "A Babe Around The House" (3 October 1969)
  - Episode 13: "Pastures New" (5 December 1969)

== Radio adaptation ==
With the television show proving popular, a radio adaptation of the programme was broadcast on BBC Radio 2 in 1969 and 1970, with Wendy Craig and Francis Matthews in the leading roles. Charlotte Mitchell was Mary, Roberta Tovey was Trudi and Hugo Keith-Johnston played Robin. The scripts were adapted from the TV scripts by Richard Waring. Since 2015 both series have been broadcast on BBC Radio 4 Extra.

== DVD release ==
The eight surviving episodes were released on DVD for the first time on Monday, 8 September 2014.
