= One Moment in Time (disambiguation) =

"One Moment in Time" is a song sung by Whitney Houston.

One Moment in Time may also refer to:

- One Moment in Time (comics), a Spider-Man storyline
- 1988 Summer Olympics Album: One Moment in Time, also titled as just One Moment in Time, an album

== See also ==
- A Moment in Time (disambiguation)
