= Jack Bentley (musician) =

British musician

John Alexander Bentley (29 April 1913 – 22 April 1994) was an English trombonist, journalist, and scriptwriter. He played trombone as part of the brass section of Jack Hylton's Orchestra and Ted Heath's big band from 1937 until the mid-1950s before becoming the show business editor of the Sunday Mirror newspaper. He was married to actress Wendy Craig from 1955 until his death.

== Biography ==
Bentley was born in Manchester in 1913 to John and Flora Bentley. His father was a retired army bandsman who had recently moved to Manchester to become a cellist in the Halle Orchestra. He was baptised at Stowell Memorial Church in Salford on 8 June 1913.

Bentley's father had taught him to play cello but, when he joined the Army as a musician at the age of fourteen and studied at the Royal Military School of Music, Kneller Hall, Twickenham he specialised on trombone. He played in the band of the Second Battalion of the Hampshire Regiment with the rank of sergeant until he bought himself out of service in 1936 to join Jack Hylton's band. He first recorded with Jack Hylton and his Orchestra in 1937. They were joined by Coleman Hawkins in 1939. With the declaration of World War II, he rejoined the Army in autumn 1939 becoming a member of the Band of the Irish Guards.

Throughout the war he combined military service with freelance playing. He worked with fellow Irish Guards bandsman Raymond Doughty's Band at Cricklewood Palais, London at the end of 1939 and joined the Queen's Theatre Orchestra in early 1940. In the summer of 1940 Bentley played for Geraldo and then for Jack Payne and Jack Jackson successively in 1941. In 1942 he joined the London Symphony Orchestra and played with Harry Roy. He worked for Ambrose intermittently from June 1942 until 1945. During 1944 he toured Italy and North Africa with the band of the Irish Guards. He also recorded for Carl Barriteau and Frank Weir (1944) and Philip Green (1943).

After demobilization, Bentley joined Ted Heath in 1945. His first recording session with Heath was on 22 October 1945. Although he left the band in 1950 to compose and write scripts, he continued to work freelance for Heath and his last recording was the 89th Palladium Sunday concert on 12 April 1953.

On 27 March 1959, he appeared in an episode of the TV talent show Find the singer and he also played himself in the film Just for Fun (1963).

He became show-business editor of the Sunday Mirror writing theatre reviews running from Hamlet to Oh! Calcutta!, reviewed films, and reported on the music business. His show business column broke high-profile stories such as Jane Asher's 1965 confirmation of rumours that she was going to marry Paul McCartney, Sean Connery's announcement that he was quitting James Bond, and a revealing interview with Mick Jagger on 17 September 1967. He was described as the newspaper's film critic in 1967 and was still bylined in 1970. His columns, which appeared as 'The Jack Bentley Page' were syndicated to Billboard and reported as far away as Australia. He retired in 1978 at the age of 65.

In retirement, he continued to write scripts for television. In the 1980s he co-wrote with his son Ross Bentley the BBC comedy series Laura and Disorder which also starred his wife.

He died of prostate cancer in Cookham, Berkshire in 1994.

== Personal life ==
As a bachelor, Bentley was a regular attendee at Diana Dors' sex parties.

Bentley married actress Wendy Craig in Chelsea, London in 1955. She was more than twenty years his junior. They had two sons, Alaster (later principal oboist for the Birmingham Royal Ballet Sinfonia) and Ross. In 2004, it was revealed that his second son Ross was the offspring of Wendy Craig's short affair with John Mortimer. Bentley had become aware of the affair early in 1961 and had spoken to Mortimer's wife Penelope about it. Craig ended the affair when her husband learned of it, and Penelope Mortimer used aspects of the story in her 1962 novel The Pumpkin Eater. Bentley agreed to bring up the boy as his own and Ross was told the identity of his biological father when he was old enough to understand. In the film adaptation of The Pumpkin Eater (1964), the character based on Bentley (John Conway) was played by James Mason.
