= Valerie Lush =

British actor (1918–2016)

- Born: 24 December 1918; Hampstead, UK
- Died: 14 May 2016 (aged 97); Paddington, UK
- Occupation: Actress
- Years active: 1957–1997 (TV)
- Spouse: Wilfred Bentley (1906–1989)

Valerie Lush (24 December 1918 – 14 May 2016) was a British actress who appeared in many British television programmes. She is best known for playing Auntie in ...And Mother Makes Three (1971–1973) and ...And Mother Makes Five (1974–1975).

== Biography ==
Lush was born in Hampstead, London, on 24 December 1918, the daughter of Charles Sidney Lush (1886–1967) and Evelyn Louise Masson (1892–1975). She married actor, and founder member of the Perth Theatre Company, Wilfred Bentley (1906–1989) in 1945.

She died on 14 May 2016 at the age of 97.

== Selected filmography ==
- Z-Cars (1970)
- Budgie (TV Series) (1972)
- Softly, Softly (1971 TV Series) (1972)
- That'll Be the Day (1972)
- ...And Mother Makes Three (1971–1973)
- Upstairs, Downstairs (1971 TV series) (1974)
- The Girls of Slender Means (1975)
- ...And Mother Makes Five (1974–1975)
- The Ghosts of Motley Hall (1977)
- Rumpole of the Bailey (1979)
- Maybury (1981)
- The Agatha Christie Hour (1982)
- Crown Court (1984)
- Bulman (1985)
- Taggart (1985)
- Brush Strokes (1986)
- Miss Marple: Nemesis (1987)
- Moondial (1988)
- French Fields (1989–1991)
- Lovejoy (1992)
- Touching Evil (1997)
