= David Parfitt =

English film producer and actor

- Born: 8 July 1958 (age 67); Sunderland, County Durham, England
- Education: Barbara Speake Stage School, London
- Occupation: Producer
- Years active: 1971–present

David Parfitt (born 8 July 1958) is an English film producer, actor, and co-founder of Trademark Films. He won the Academy Award for Best Picture at the 71st Academy Awards for Shakespeare in Love (1998).

== Early life ==
Parfitt was born in Sunderland and educated at the Barbara Speake Stage School, an independent school in London.

== Career ==
He began his stage career with the Sunderland Empire Theatre Society in 1969 and later gained work on television, including playing Peter Harrison in the sitcoms ...And Mother Makes Three (1971–1973) and its sequel ...And Mother Makes Five (1974–1976) and appearing in Love in a Cold Climate (1980). In the BBC Radio 4 serial The Archers, he was the first actor in the role of Tim Beecham, an old friend of Nigel Pargetter.

=== Work as a producer ===
Parfitt gave up acting in the late 1980s to concentrate on production. He co-founded the Renaissance Theatre Company with Kenneth Branagh in 1987, and was associate producer of Renaissance Film's first production, Henry V in 1989. Since then he has produced and associate-produced many British films, including Peter's Friends, Swan Song (1992), Much Ado About Nothing (1993), Mary Shelley's Frankenstein, Twelfth Night (1996), The Wings of the Dove (1997), Gangs of New York (Production Consultant), I Capture the Castle, Chasing Liberty, A Bunch of Amateurs, My Week with Marilyn, Loving Vincent and Red Joan. Shakespeare in Love won the BAFTA Award for Best Film as well as the Academy Award and The Madness of King George won the BAFTA Award for Outstanding British Film in 1996.

He produced TV adaptations of Parade's End in 2012 and The Wipers Times in 2013 for the BBC, both of which were nominated for British Academy Television Awards. His company has since produced The Wipers Times in theatres in the West End and throughout the UK.

He also produced The Father (2020) and received a nomination for the Academy Award for Best Picture, as well as nominations for Best Film and Outstanding British Film at the BAFTA Film Awards.

=== Other activities ===
He was Chairman of the British Academy of Film and Television Arts (BAFTA) from 2008 to 2010 and was Chair of Film London from 2010 to 2017. Since 2018 he has been a governor of Dulwich College, where he was formerly a parent.

== Personal life ==
He was awarded an Honorary Doctorate of Arts from the University of Sunderland in 1999. He lives in Brixton with his wife Liz and their three sons, Bill, Thomas and Max.

He is a supporter of Sunderland AFC, but couldn't kick a ball to save his life.

== Filmography ==
He was a producer in all films unless otherwise noted.

=== Film ===
Year	Film	Credit
1989	Henry V	Associate producer
1992	Peter's Friends	Line producer
1993	Much Ado About Nothing	
1994	Mary Shelley's Frankenstein	Co-producer
1994	The Madness of King George	
1996	Twelfth Night	
1997	The Wings of the Dove	
1998	Shakespeare in Love	
2003	I Capture the Castle	
2004	Chasing Liberty	
2008	Dean Spanley	Executive producer
2008	A Bunch of Amateurs	
2011	My Week with Marilyn	
2017	Loving Vincent	Executive producer
2018	Red Joan	
2020	The Father	

As an actor

Year	Film	Role
1985	The Doctor and the Devils	Billings
1987	Mister Corbett's Ghost	Villager
1989	Henry V	Messenger

Miscellaneous crew

Year	Film	Role
2002	Gangs of New York	Production consultant

Thanks

Year	Film	Role
2003	The Republic of Love	Many thanks

=== Television ===
Year	Title	Notes
1989	Look Back in Anger	Television film
2012	Parade's End	
2013	The Wipers Times	Television film
2014	Glyndebourne: The Untold History	Documentary
TBA	The War Rooms	

As an actor

Year	Title	Role	Notes
1971	Elizabeth R	Philip's Son	
1973	A Picture of Katherine Mansfield	Pip	
1973	The Kids from 47A	Starkey	
1971−73	...And Mother Makes Three	Peter Harrison	
1974−76	...And Mother Makes Five	Peter Redway	
1977	Jackanory Playhouse	Mark Armitage	
1977	Raffles	Pageboy	
1977	The Peppermint Pig	George	
1978	Play for Love	Peter	
1978	Touch and Go	Charles	
1978	The Lost Boys	Nico	Television film
1978−80	Premiere	Police Constable Young Nifty	
1980	Mackenzie	Alan	
1980	Love in a Cold Climate	Little Matt	
1981	Honky Tonk Heroes	David	
1981	Funny Man	Tommy Green	
1982	Stalky & Co.	Beetle	
1983	To the Lighthouse	Andrew Ramsay	Television film
1984	Moonfleet	Boy with Gun	
1987	Mister Corbett's Ghost	—N/a	Television film
