= Nanny (TV series) =

British TV drama series (1981–1983)

- Genre: Period drama
- Starring: Wendy Craig
- Composer: Grant Hossack
- Country of origin: United Kingdom
- Original language: English
- No. of series: 3
- No. of episodes: 30

Production
- Producers: Guy Slater (series 1–2); Bernard Krichefski (series 3)
- Running time: 50 minutes
- Production company: BBC

Original release
- Network: BBC1
- Release: 10 January 1981 – 13 March 1983

Nanny is a BBC television series that ran between 1981 and 1983. All three series were commercially released in the UK.

== Plot ==
In this historical drama, Wendy Craig stars as nanny Barbara Gray, caring for children in 1930s England. When Barbara Gray leaves the divorce court she has no money and no job—just an iron will and a love for children. The third series is set in London during World War II.
