= Naked Evil =

1966 British film by Stanley Goulder

- Theatrical release poster
- Directed by: Stanley Goulder
- Written by: Stanley Goulder
- Based on: TV play by Jon Manchip White
- Produced by: Michael F. Johnson; Steven Pallos
- Starring: Basil Dignam; Anthony Ainley; Suzanne Neve
- Cinematography: Geoffrey Faithfull
- Edited by: Peter Musgrave
- Music by: Bernard Ebbinghouse
- Production company: Protelco
- Distributed by: Columbia
- Release date: 1966
- Running time: 85 mins
- Country: United Kingdom
- Language: English
- Budget: £60,000

Naked Evil is a black-and-white independent 1966 British horror film, written and directed by Stanley Goulder and starring Basil Dignam, Anthony Ainley, Richard Coleman and John Ashley Hamilton. It was produced by Michael F. Johnson and based on the BBC-TV play The Obi by Jon Manchip White. The police investigate voodoo activities in a student hostel.

It was released in the US with the black-and-white tinted so that it appeared to be in colour and was re-released as a television movie as Exorcism at Midnight, with a modified plot and new full-colour sequences featuring an American cast.

== Cast ==
- Basil Dignam as Jim Benson
- Anthony Ainley as Dick Alderson
- Richard Coleman as Inspector Hollis
- John Ashley Hamilton as Danny (credited as George A. Saunders)
- Suzanne Neve as Janet Tuttle
- Olaf Pooley as Father Goodman
- Carmen Munroe as Beverley (credited as Carmen Monroe)
- Brylo Forde as Amizan
- Bari Jonson as Spady
- Dan Jackson as Lloyd
- Oscar James as Dupree
- Ronald Bridges as Wilkins

== Plot ==
A man hurries to his tenement flat. Inside, he finds an obi – a glass bottle filled with graveyard dirt and feathers – on his kitchen table. He steps back in fright. The obi suddenly falls to the floor. As it smashes, he is thrown through the window, falling to his death. It is but a taste of things to come.

A few miles away, Fr. Goodman has reported the desecration of the cemetery at his church. The previous night, he saw someone scooping up dirt from a freshly-dug grave, but the person fled before Goodman could identify him. Goodman tells Inspector Hollis that after 15 years in Jamaica, where he studied Obeah, he knows that the person was making an obi. Hollis wonders why Goodman's church was chosen as, in his words, "it's miles away from the coloured quarter of town". Goodman points out, though, that it is close to the Southdene Hostel for Commonwealth Students, home to several Jamaicans. He takes Hollis to the hostel to meet its head, Jim Benson, who had been in Jamaica at the same time as Goodman. Benson denies any connection between the desecration and the students, whom he calls 'the pick of the Commonwealth – highly intelligent and most of them scientists'.

Benson, his secretary Janet Tuttle, deputy head Dick Alderson, Goodman and Hollis take lunch with the students. Benson does not eat, however, complaining of stomach problems. He collapses and is helped to his room. Alderson tells Hollis that Benson has been ill for weeks. Simultaneously, Amizan, the hostel's elderly Jamaican caretaker, shuffles by.

Hollis asks Anderson to have a word with a Jamaican student, Danny, who was detained by the police after a violent street fight. Danny was not involved, just in the wrong place at the wrong time, returning to the hostel after visiting his girlfriend Beverley. Hollis knows that the fight was between the drug-dealing gangs of Lloyd and Spady, rival nightclub owners.

Later that night, Amizan is emptying the waste bins in the Jamaican students' rooms. When he gets to Danny's, Danny tells him to stop hurting Benson and threatens to tell Benson everything. Amizan says, menacingly, that it would not be too healthy for Danny if he did. Danny kicks him out.

Benson shows Alderson an obi that he found in his room just before his stomach problems began. When Alderson asks, Benson says that he has not told the police about it because he fears causing a scandal at the hostel. Alderson tells Amizan to dispose of the obi, but Amizan refuses. Alderson carries the obi down to Amizan's 'hut' - he lives next to the furnace in the cellar - and orders Amizan to burn it. Amizan, in the back room of his hut, where he hides his voodoo paraphernalia, again refuses. Alderson throws it into the furnace.

After an end-of-term dance party at the hostel, Alderson walks Tuttle home. They are romantically involved. Along the way, they find a decapitated, bloody cockerel hanging from a tree. Alderson tells Benson about it, oddly finding gravel on the floor outside Benson's door. He finds another obi in Benson's liquor cabinet. Benson is truly afraid of the second obi.

The next day, Benson and Alderson find several more dead cockerels. Goodman performs an exorcism of sorts as they burn them. Amizan goes to Danny's room, hands Danny an obi and says, "I think it's time you paid another visit to our friend". Goodman blesses Benson's second obi and says that now it can be disposed of. Benson will not do so, though. Instead, he shows it to the students and lectures them on the evils of witchcraft.

Danny delivers the obi to Lloyd, who says that Spady wants Danny dead as Spady believes that the obis have caused the deaths of three members of his gang. A frightened Danny almost forgets to collect his money from Lloyd before he hurriedly leaves.

At the hostel, Alderson takes Danny to Benson. Danny sees the gravel in front of Benson's door and is afraid to enter because, he says, the gravel is keeping something evil inside. Benson accuses Danny of placing the obis in his room. When Danny denies it, Benson smashes the obi. Danny screams in terror and runs out.

The following morning Tuttle finds Benson dead, stabbed with a decorative spear. When Hollis arrives, he is angry that Alderson had not told him earlier about the obis, but Alderson appears to be in shock. Dupree, another Jamaican student, tells Hollis that Danny has locked himself in his room. Hollis breaks down the door and finds Danny hysterical and holding the bloody spear. Danny denies killing Benson and says that Amizan shoved the spear under his door.

Danny and the others rush to Amizan's hut. He too is dead. In his back room the police find the voodoo paraphernalia and £200 that Amizan had got from selling obis to Lloyd. Goodman arrives and says that Alderson is in a 'ritual trance' of the sort he'd seen in Jamaica. Dupree asks Goodman to exorcise the evil at the hostel.

Goodman, Dupree and Danny and go back to Amizan's hut, where his body lies on a table, covered with a sheet. Dupree and Goodman burn everything from Amizan's back room, each obi exploding in the furnace. At the final explosion, Danny screams in fear as, even though they are inside the building, a gust of wind blows the sheet off the table. Amizan's body has disappeared.

At the same moment, Alderson rises from the couch he has been lying on, choking and clutching his throat. When Goodman asks him his name, he replies 'Amizan' in Amizan's voice. Goodman casts Amizan's spirit out of Alderson's body. Alderson then says that after Benson died, he went to Amizan's hut and, possessed by Benson, strangled Amizan.

The dead Amizan has somehow walked off into the night. Goodman summarises the situation, saying that whenever evil is done, whoever has done it has forfeited his soul to the Devil and his torments.

== Production ==
According to the film's credits, Naked Evil is a co-production of Protelco Films and Gibraltar Films Ltd. and was filmed at Rayant Studios, Bushey Heath, Herts, England. The film is set in the fictitious city of Middlehampton.

Half the budget of £60,000 was provided out of the pocket of executive producer Richard Gordon after Columbia Pictures Corporation refused his request to produce the film as a full-colour A feature and instead specified that it be a black-and-white B film, which British film historian John Hamilton says guaranteed it a 'limited shelf life' at a time when colour films were becoming more common. The film was shot in four weeks.

== Distribution ==
Naked Evil was sent to theatres in the UK as a supporting feature in 1966 but had only a short run as it was given 'little recognition' by Columbia Pictures and as such it 'duly vanished from sight'. Hamilton writes that the film was given an X certificate by the British Board of Film Classification (BBFC), which meant that it could not be shown in theatres to people under age 16. However, the website of the BBFC itself says that Naked Evil was granted an A certificate on 17 January 1966, meaning at the time that the film was considered 'more suitable for adults' than for children.

Similarly, a theatrical poster from the US shows that the Motion Picture Association of America (MPAA) rated the picture PG; i.e. 'Parental Guidance Suggested' as 'some material may not be suitable for children'. The rating was not age-specific.

The first distribution to theatres in the US was by Saxton Films in 1973, followed by a re-release in 1975 by Hampton International and another re-release by Independent International Pictures in 1979. The American releases sandwiched distribution by Saguenay Films in Canada in 1974.

During its initial release in the US, Naked Evil was the second feature on a double-bill with The Gorilla Gang (1968), the English-language version of the (West) German crime thriller, Der Gorilla von Soho. The American releases of Naked Evil contains scenes that were tinted 'variously red, green, blue and amber', a process known as 'Evil Color' or 'MultiColor' Under either name, the gimmick did little beyond causing viewers 'occasional confusion and eyestrain'. After a short time, Naked Evil was relegated to be the third film on triple-bills at drive-in theatres.

=== Exorcism at Midnight ===
Following the release of The Exorcist (1973), a number of films on similar themes were made in an attempt to cash in on that film's success. As part of this, an uncredited Al Adamson was hired to direct new sequences for a re-edited version of Naked Evil. Working for Independent International, Adams shot approximately 15 minutes of new full-colour footage in New York City in one day at a cost of about $5000. The new version utilised an American cast which included Lawrence Tierney, Catherine Burgess, Addison Greene and Robert Allen. The additional sequences were used as a framing device, so that what remained of the original film, which had been cut by about 15 minutes, became a flashback, illustrating what a patient undergoing psychiatric treatment was telling a doctor. The revision was then christened Exorcism at Midnight and sold directly to television, where it was frequently shown in late-night time slots.

== Reception ==
The Monthly Film Bulletin wrote: "Crudely conceived, woodenly directed black magic thriller. The cast, playing dead straight, are very weak, and the few macabre moments are singularly unconvincing."

Kine Weekly wrote: "Black-Magic hokum. ... This is absolute rubbish, but very enjoyable because it is played quite straight and the atmosphere is just right."

Film critic Bryan Senn quotes Gordon as having said that he was disappointed with Naked Evil, as he had planned it to be 'a real horror film' with greater emphasis on the 'voodoo stuff and less of the gangsterism and all that'. As such, and because of limitations imposed by the low budget, Gordon said that "It's not what I would really call a genre picture in its present form. It's sort of neither fish nor fowl". Senn himself finds good and bad in the film, writing that 'Director Stanley Goulder's clever staging and cinematographer Geoffrey Faithful's atmospheric lighting and camerawork weave a palpable spell of evil around the sinister events'. But he goes on to say that 'Unfortunately, Naked Evil's rather schizophrenic construction tends to weaken the film's overall impact and undermines Gould's careful staging' in that 'the more mundane gangster scenes' and 'cheap nightclub sets seem dull and out of place next to the more fantastical Obeah angle'.

While Hamilton writes that Naked Evil 'has moments of genuine quality', he also finds a 'tendency toward padding', as in the screen time devoted to Danny and Beverley's romance, the activities of 'West Indian' street gangs and a 'dull flashback, dragged out in slow motion'. He says that the 'acting is best described as adequate' and is critical of the portrayal of the film's Jamaican students - who one character, Tuttle, describes as always happy - as being 'prone to burst spontaneously into the singing of calypsos'.

British film historian Phil Hardy offers harsh criticism of the film. He calls Naked Evil 'racist sensationalism about evil voodoo practices in England' and calls it 'a tiresomely offensive film exploiting the Boy's Own black bogeyman stereotype, even though some of "them" may appear to be decent chaps'. However, he places no blame on the actors themselves as black actors had few opportunities in Britain at the time the film was made.
