= Binfield Heath =

Village in Oxfordshire, England

Coordinates: 51.5095°N 0.9235°W

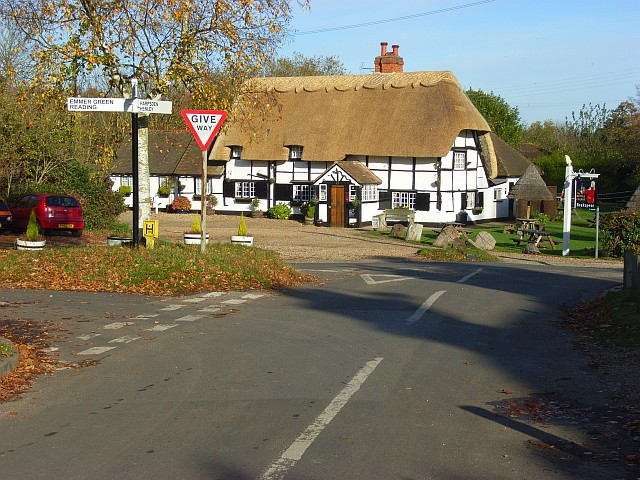
- The Bottle and Glass Inn

- Location within Oxfordshire
- Area: 6.13 km^{2} (2.37 sq mi)
- Population: 709 (2011 Census)
  - Density: 116/km^{2} (300/sq mi)
- OS grid reference: SU7478
- Civil parish: Shiplake
- District: South Oxfordshire
- Shire county: Oxfordshire
- Region: South East
- Country: England
- Sovereign state: United Kingdom
- Post town: Henley-on-Thames
- Postcode district: RG9
- Dialling code: 0118
- Police: Thames Valley
- Fire: Oxfordshire
- Ambulance: South Central
- UK Parliament: Henley and Thame
- Website: Binfield Heath

Binfield Heath is a village and civil parish in South Oxfordshire, England, 2 1/2 miles (4 km) south-southwest of Henley-on-Thames and 3 1/2 miles (6 km) northeast of Reading on a southern knoll of the Chiltern Hills. The 2011 Census recorded the parish population as 709. The village has a Congregational Church, ground for polo, Michelin star chef-run restaurant, and public house. 12 of its 294 homes are listed buildings.

== History and creation as a village ==
Remains of what is believed to be a Roman temple have been discovered on the north side of the village at High Wood. Binfield Heath takes its name from the Saxon hundred of Binfield to which it belonged, along with much of the locality. The name Binfield itself derives from Benifeld, noted in 1176 with later variant spellings, and may come from an original Beonan field, ‘a field belonging to Beona'. Because of the poor quality of land in this area it was left as heath, roughly in the centre of what is now the village. The heath was originally common land, lying between what is now Dunsden Way, Gravel Road, Emmer Green Road and Common Lane. The heath had four gates leading onto it, one each at the Bottle & Glass, the New Inn, The Coach and Horses and Coppid Cross Roads. Local inhabitants had the right to pasture their animals on it. Shiplake Row, leading down from Binfield Heath towards Shiplake Cross, was among the earliest roads to be populated.

Until 2003, half of Binfield Heath and the hamlet of Crowsley were the western part of the civil parish of Shiplake with the rest in the parish of Eye & Dunsden. This almost exactly rectangular tract of land acquired its own civil parish in 2003. Having some other amenities, Binfield Heath meets the criteria of a village — omitting the old criterion of an Anglican place of worship to give the contemporary definition of a village. The central community is green buffered but not isolated, as it is a relatively small knoll in the foothills of the Chiltern Hills: Dunsden church is 1/2 mile (800 m) south-west and both communities are combined with the ecclesiastical parish today of Shiplake. A house on Arch Hill was used as headquarters for an illegal global drug operation until it was raided in 1977 under Operation Julie, as recounted by Leaf Fielding in the book To live outside the law.

The village has revived the tradition of the annual 'wheelbarrow race', which used to run in the seventies and eighties between the Bottle and Glass Inn on Bones Lane and the White Hart at Shiplake Row (now Orwells restaurant), a distance of 1.2 miles. Pairs competed in fancy dress, with one entrant riding and the other pushing. Both would down a pint of beer at the start before charging down Common Lane towards Arch Hill and the village stores; when they reached the halfway point at the New Inn (since closed), they would down another beer before swapping roles and making for the finish at the White Hart where a final pint awaited them. The event was held on public roads and discontinued in 1991. After a hiatus of nearly 30 years, the event took place on the village recreation ground on 9 June 2019. The village has for the past 70 years held a Dog and Flower show which takes place on the field opposite Holmwood House

== Geography ==
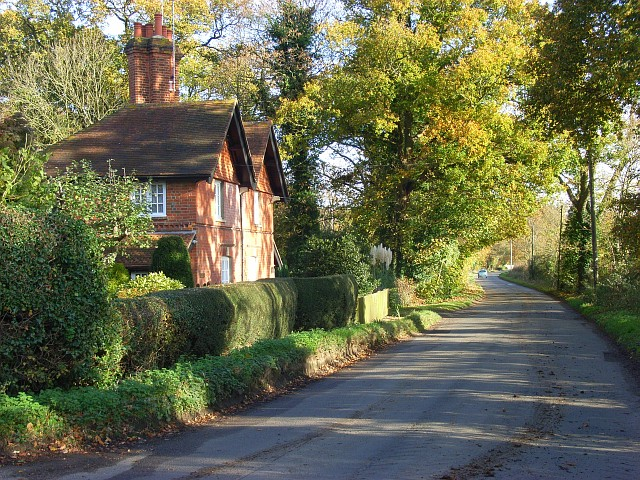
Two cottages in the southwest of Binfield Heath near the main area of woodland, which forms part of the background

Binfield Heath has an almost continuous street of Victorian houses, Shiplake Row, which leads 1/2 mile (800 m) and descends 25 metres to the larger village of Shiplake by the River Thames. Crowsley Park Wood is the parish's largest woodland and is the opposite side of the village from the combined 'Comp Wood, The Common and Oakhouse Wood' and the field-surrounded Kings Common woodland.

== Landmarks ==
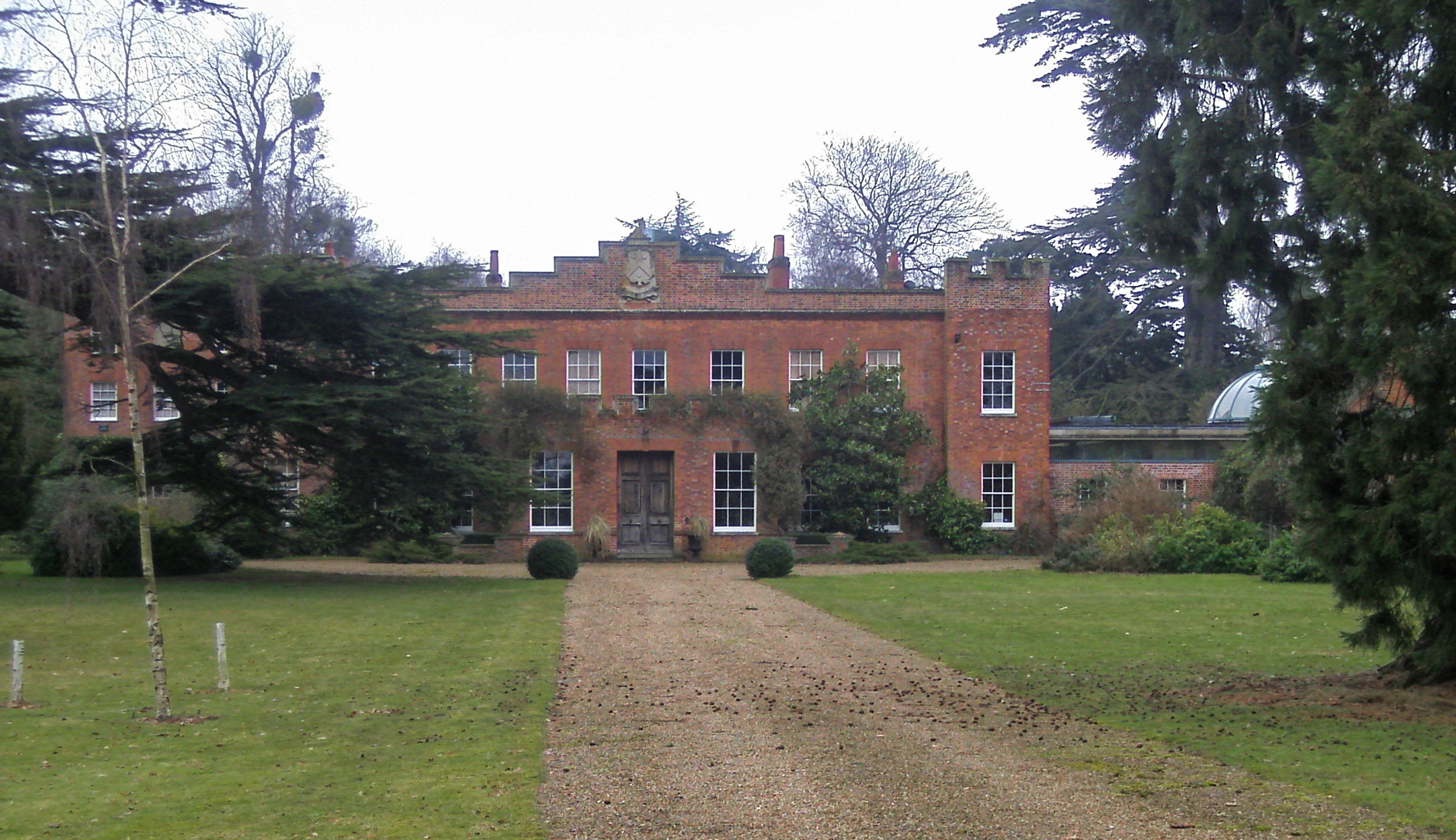
Crowsley Park House

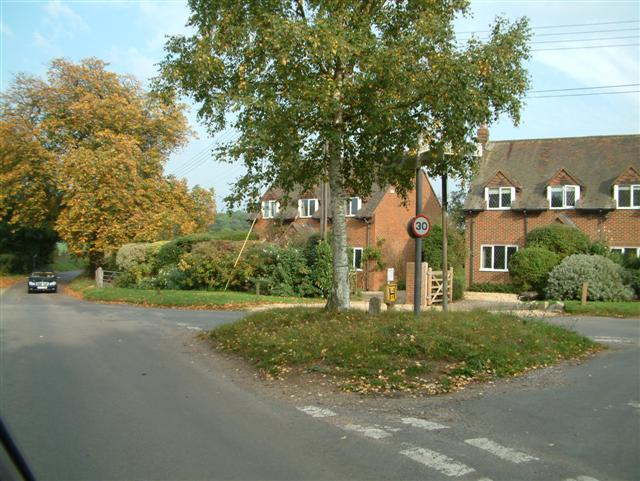
20th century homes around a green junction on the edge of the village.

The Crowsley Park estate, including a Grade II listed, 18th century mansion house, a grotto, barns and a stable, is west of the village centre which has the vast majority of buildings in the village. In the heart of the village and to the west and south are 11 other homes, also listed: Jasmine Cottage, Freize Farmhouse, The Well House, Fir Tree Cottage, Thatched Cottage, Shiplake Rise Cottage, The Bottle and Glass, The Old House, Coppice Cottage, Elm Tree Farmhouse, Hampstead Farm Stable, and seven barns. Keeps Well, a covered well by Holmwood house was accidentally demolished by a tractor driver in the 1990s, but has subsequently been rebuilt.

Holmwood, an 18th-century country house, is located on Shiplake Row in Binfield Heath, set over 26.6 acres of grounds. It was owned by Admiral Charles Swinburne in the 19th century and was the family home of Swinburne's son, the poet Algernon Swinburne. For many years Holmwood was owned by the Makower family. It was owned by the barrister and peer Jonathan Marks, Baron Marks of Henley-on-Thames from 2008 to 2018 and restored by him. Holmwood was bought by Rupert Murdoch and Jerry Hall for £11 million in 2019. Murdoch and Hall divorced in 2022 with Hall keeping Holmwood in the divorce settlement.

There used to be two brick kilns on the east end of Kiln Lane; the first dates back to 1817 and closed between 1903 and 1907, the other kiln closed in 1935. At the west end of Kiln Lane are some timber houses, donated by Sweden at the end of the Second World War to ease the housing shortage. The village smithy, which stands next to the chestnut tree in the centre of the village, is now The Forge Garage. The village still has a local post office and village store which serves the every growing community

== Congregational church ==
The Congregational Church was built in a Gothic Revival style in 1835, an early embellished example of what was considered a nonconformist and which remains a Protestant place of worship.

== Amenities ==
- The Bottle and Glass Inn
- Restaurant: Orwells, open since 2010 by Michelin-starred chef Ryan Simpson.
- Polo club and horse riding lessons.
- Village shop with Post Office and off licence: Binfield Heath Stores
- Motor mechanics: R Cotterill and son
- Recreation ground and play park

== Notable people ==
- Christian Bale, actor, lived on Gravel Road and attended nearby Shiplake Primary School.
- Robert Hardy, actor, lived in Binfield Heath near High Wood. The house sported a weather vane showing an archer, after the actor's passion for archery.
- Amanda Jennings, author, lives in Kiln Lane.
- Lane Meddick, actor, made numerous film and TV appearances, including Z Cars and Coronation Street.
- Rupert Murdoch, businessman, and his then wife Jerry Hall purchased Holmwood, an 18th-century house and estate in the village.
- Tom Rowlands, musician with electronic duo The Chemical Brothers grew up in the village and attended Shiplake Primary School.

== Demography ==
The population rose by 9.6% in the ten years to 2011 (from 643 in 2001 to 709). Binfield Heathians are known as 'fuzz-croppers', as distinct from the nearby Shiplake 'water rats'.

2011 Census Key Statistics
Output area	Population	Homes	% Owned outright	% Owned with a loan	km^{2}	km^{2} Greenspace (Note: Comprises here cultivated fields, woodland, pasture, a public green and no marshland.)	km^{2} gardens	km^{2} road and rail
Binfield Heath (civil parish)	709	294	53.7%	36.1%	6.13	5.62	0.22	0.10

== Notes and references ==
Notes
