= Lane Meddick =

Welsh actor, journalist and writer (1924–2017)

Leonard John Meddick (18 March 1924 – 1 January 2017), known professionally as Lane Meddick, was a British actor, journalist and writer.

== Early life and career ==
Meddick was born on 18 March 1924 in Barry, Glamorgan, Wales. He died on 1 January 2017 in Binfield Heath, Henley-on-Thames, Oxfordshire, England.

He worked as a trainee reporter for the Associated Press of America on Fleet Street, and then joined the Royal Air Force in 1942, aged 18. He qualified as a Flying Officer and went on to fly Hurricanes, Spitfires and Dakotas. He trained in England and South Africa and served in Egypt, India, Ceylon, Malaya, Sumatra, Singapore and Java. He returned to journalism in 1947 with a south London suburban paper, before finding work as a stage manager in repertory theatre in the 1950s. Despite having no formal training, he gradually took on small acting parts, travelling across the whole of England. He adopted the pseudonym Lane Meddick for TV and film work.

== Film, TV and writing work ==
Film appearances include: Journey's End (1954), The Dam Busters (1955 - uncredited RAF orderly), Touch of Death (1961), Flower of Evil (1961), Countdown to Danger (1967) and Psychomania (1973).

He made numerous TV appearances between 1953 and 1980, including Coronation Street, Hancock, Steptoe and Son, Dial M for Murder, Z-Cars, The Diary of Samuel Pepys and Jango.

Writing credits include Potts and the Phantom Piper (TV series, 1957), No Hiding Place (TV series, 1960), and tales of boys-own military adventures for DC magazines and the Eagle comic.
