= ...And Mother Makes Five =

- Genre: Sitcom
- Created by: Richard Waring
- Starring: Wendy Craig; Richard Coleman; Robin Davies; David Parfitt; Maxine Gordon; Valerie Lush; Charlotte Mitchell; Tony Britton
- Country of origin: United Kingdom
- Original language: English
- No. of series: 4
- No. of episodes: 26

Production
- Running time: 30 minutes
- Production company: Thames Television

Original release
- Network: ITV
- Release: 1 May 1974 – 11 February 1976

Related
- ...And Mother Makes Three

...And Mother Makes Five is a British sitcom that aired on ITV from 1 May 1974 to 11 February 1976. Starring Wendy Craig, it is the sequel of ...And Mother Makes Three and aired for four series. It was written by Richard Waring, Brian Cooke and Johnnie Mortimer. Craig also wrote thirteen of the episodes under the pseudonym Jonathan Marr, including the whole of series two. It was made for the ITV network by Thames Television.

== Background ==
This sitcom was the follow-up to ...And Mother Makes Three, which had finished in June 1973. The final series had seen Sally Harrison, a widowed mother of two sons, marrying antique bookseller David Redway, the divorced father of one daughter. The two families then became one. The two sitcoms had almost exactly the same cast, though Miriam Mann had been replaced by Maxine Gordon in the role of Jane Redway.

== Cast ==
- Wendy Craig - Sally Redway (formerly Harrison)
- Richard Coleman - David Redway
- Robin Davies - Simon Harrison
- David Parfitt - Peter Harrison
- Maxine Gordon - Jane Redway
- Valerie Lush - Auntie (Florence Massey)
- Charlotte Mitchell - Monica Spicer
- Tony Britton - Joss Spicer
- Gwen Nelson - Sally's Mum
- Patricia Routledge - Mrs. Fletcher
- Julian Somers - Mr. Turnbull

== Plot ==
...And Mother Makes Five is similar to ...And Mother Makes Three with domestic problems being the centre of the programme. The children are now older, but as troublesome as before. There are new characters in the form of Joss and Monica Spicer, and Mrs Fletcher.

== Episodes ==
=== Series One (1974) ===
1. "Where Our Caravan Is Resting" (1 May 1974)
2. "The Matter of Tiny Feet" (8 May 1974)
3. "Seed of Suspicion" (15 May 1974)
4. "To the Aid of the Party" (22 May 1974)
5. "Wish You Were There" (29 May 1974)
6. "If I Can Help Somebody" (5 June 1974)
7. "Fair Exchange" (12 June 1974)

=== Series Two (1974) ===
1. "Love's Labours Lost" (22 October 1974)
2. "Double Standards" (29 October 1974)
3. "Bridging the Gap" (5 November 1974)
4. "For Richer For Poorer" (12 November 1974)
5. "Date Data" (19 November 1974)
6. "Part of the Furniture" (26 November 1974)

=== Series Three (1975) ===
1. "Growing Pains" (4 June 1975)
2. "Goodbye Mr Turnbull" (11 June 1975)
3. "Friends and Neighbours" (18 June 1975)
4. "The Mating Test" (25 June 1975)
5. "Legs Eleven" (2 July 1975)
6. "Art For Art's Sake" (9 July 1975)
7. "Health Through Joy" (16 July 1975)

=== Series Four (1976) ===
1. "Words and Pictures" (7 January 1976)
2. "None So Blind" (14 January 1976)
3. "Love Is A Most Confounded Thing" (21 January 1976)
4. "Unlicenced Premises" (28 January 1976)
5. "Sally's Diary" (4 February 1976)
6. "Jobs for the Boy" (11 February 1976)

== DVD releases ==
DVD	Release date
The Complete Series 1	28 May 2012
The Complete Series 2	6 August 2012
The Complete Series 3	1 October 2012
The Complete Series 4 The Complete Series 1 to 4 Box Set	26 November 2012
