= Jonathan Marks, Baron Marks of Henley-on-Thames =

British politician and life peer (born 1952)

The Right Honourable The Lord Marks of Henley-on-Thames KC
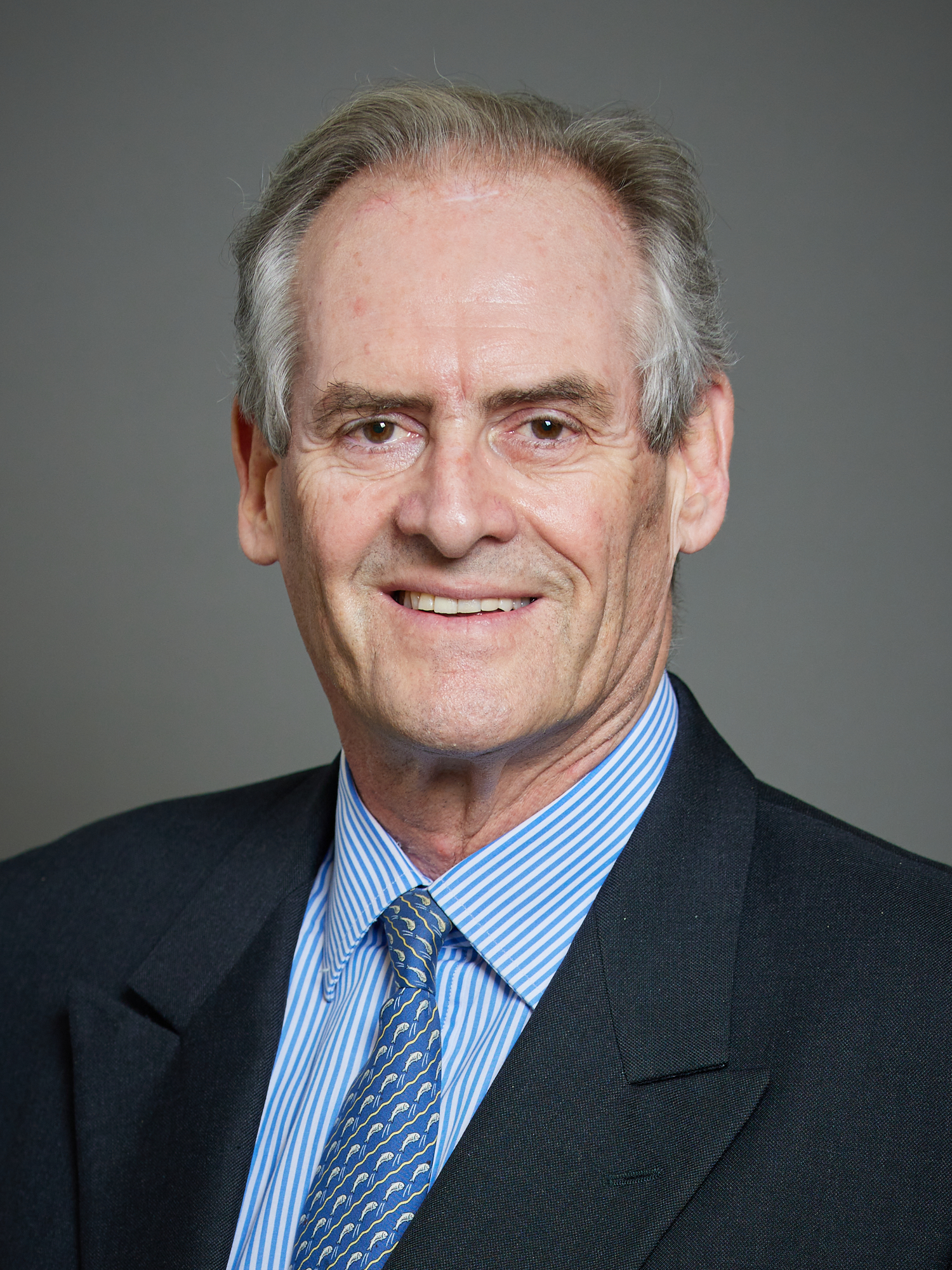
- Official portrait, 2022

Liberal Democrat Justice Spokesperson in the House of Lords
- Incumbent
- Assumed office 1 June 2015

Member of the House of Lords
- Lord Temporal
- Life peerage 11 January 2011

Personal details
- Born: Jonathan Clive Marks; 19 October 1952 (age 73)
- Party: SDP (1981–1988); Liberal Democrats (1988–present)
- Spouses: Sarah Ann Russell (m. 1982; dissolved 1991) Medina Cafopoulos (m. 1993)
- Children: 7
- Education: Harrow School
- Alma mater: University College, Oxford; Inns of Court School of Law

Jonathan Clive Marks, Baron Marks of Henley-on-Thames, KC (born 19 October 1952) is a British barrister and Liberal Democrat life peer in the House of Lords.

== Biography ==
Marks was educated at Harrow School and University College, Oxford.

He was called to the bar by Inner Temple in 1975. During the 1980s and early 1990s he was a visiting lecturer in advocacy at the University of Malaya, Kuala Lumpur, the University of Mauritius and Sri Lanka Law College. He was appointed QC in 1995 and continued in practice as a barrister. He has been a Freeman of the City of London since 1975 and is a member of the Worshipful Company of Pattenmakers.

Marks joined the Social Democratic Party on its foundation in 1981. He contested Weston-super-Mare at the 1983 general election and Falmouth and Camborne at the 1987 general election as well as Cornwall and Plymouth at the 1984 European election.

Following the creation of the Liberal Democrats, Marks served as a member of the party's Committee for England in 1988–89. He was a member of the Federal Policy Committee from 2004 to 2015 and was Chair of the Liberal Democrat Lawyers Association from 2001 to 2007.

On 19 November 2010, it was announced that Marks would be created a life peer. He was created Baron Marks of Henley-on-Thames, of Henley-on-Thames in the County of Oxfordshire, on 11 January 2011 and was introduced to the House of Lords on 13 January. Marks has served on the Defamation Bill Joint Committee and for three years on the House of Lords Delegated Powers and Regulatory Reform Committee. In 2012 he was appointed Liberal Democrat Spokesperson on Justice in the House of Lords and in 2015 was appointed the Liberal Democrat Shadow Justice Secretary. He continues in post as the Liberal Democrat Spokesperson on Justice and speaks regularly on justice issues. He is the sponsor of a private members' bill to give rights to cohabiting couples on relationship breakdown and intestacy, the Cohabitation Rights Bill. (Cohabitation Rights Bill [HL])

== Personal life ==
In 1982, Marks married Sarah Ann Russell, with whom he has one son and one daughter. Their marriage was dissolved in 1991, and Marks married Clementine Medina Cafopoulos in 1993. He has three sons and two daughters from his second marriage.

Marks owned Holmwood, a country house in the Oxfordshire village of Binfield Heath, from 2008 to 2018.

== Arms ==
Coat of arms of Jonathan Marks, Baron Marks of Henley-on-Thames
Crest Two swords in saltire Argent perched and respectant on the blades thereof a Cornish chough Proper and martlet Or. Escutcheon Azure a Pegasus passant Argent maned tailed and unguled Or on a chief Argent three speedwell flowers Proper. Supporters Dexter a lion Sable pendant from the neck by a cord tied in the centre with a bow two arrows in saltire point downwards Argent sinister a stag Gules attired Or pendant from the neck by a cord tied with a bow a bugle horn also Or. Motto Justitia omnibus ('Justice for all')

Orders of precedence in the United Kingdom
Preceded by The Lord Strasburger	Gentlemen; Baron Marks of Henley-on-Thames	Followed by The Lord Wasserman
