= Maxine Gordon =

British actress

Maxine Gordon is a British actress. She played Jane Edmonds in the 1972 Sidney Lumet film The Offence.

She also had roles in The Dick Emery Show (Jenny Page), ...And Mother Makes Five, The Canal Children, the ITV series Crossroads, drama series Midnight Is a Place, and in "Stigma", a 1977 episode of the BBC series A Ghost Story for Christmas.

== Selected filmography ==
- S.W.A.L.K. (1982)
- The Borgias (1981)
- Crossroads (1979)
- Lillie (1978)
- ...And Mother Makes Five (1974)
- The Offence (1973)
- ITV Saturday Night Theatre (1972)
