= Stafford Gordon =

British actor

Stafford Gordon is a British actor.

Gordon has played various character roles in British television series such as Crown Court, Minder, Prime Suspect and The Bill. His longest running role was as Company Sergeant Major Gilby in all three series of Spearhead (1979–1981).
