= Marlene Sidaway =

British actress

Marlene Sidaway (born 1937) is a British television, film and theatre actress best known for playing Brenda Taylor in the long-running soap opera Coronation Street.

== Early life ==
Sidaway was born in Thornaby-on-Tees in the North Riding of Yorkshire. On leaving school, she trained as an adding-machine operator, and, in 1961, she was accepted into the East 15 Acting School in London. Sidaway's first job was with Brian Way's Theatre Centre in London, touring schools across the country. She spent several years in repertory theatre, before settling in Manchester and starting to work in radio and television.

== Theatre roles ==
In February 2013, Sidaway played the role of Mrs Purdy, in D.H. Lawrence's The Daughter-in-Law, at the Crucible Theatre, Sheffield, South Yorkshire. In September 2015, she played the role of Mrs Wilberforce in The Ladykillers, at the Watermill Theatre, Bagnor, Newbury, Berkshire. In February 2018, Sidaway played the role of Miriam in Ghassan Kanafani's Returning to Haifa, at the Finborough Theatre, West Brompton, London. Later that year, in June, she played the role of Doris in Alan Bennett's A Cream Cracker under the Settee in people's homes, in every postcode area across the City of Leeds, and at the West Yorkshire Playhouse. The following year, in May 2019, Sidaway played Flora Parkin in Beneath the Blue Rinse at the Park Theatre, Finsbury Park, London.

== Television roles ==
Sidaway has been a familiar character actor since the 1970s, notably playing Brenda Taylor in the ITV soap opera Coronation Street between June 1990 and November 1992. She had previously appeared in the soap twice with cameo roles in 1976, as Mrs Briscoe, and again in 1982 as Mrs Fletcher. In 1995, Sidaway played Hill the housekeeper in the BBC adaption of Pride and Prejudice in 1995, and the court usher Dee Yearwood in the BBC courtroom drama Accused in 1996.

Sidaway has appeared in four episodes of the ITV detective series Midsomer Murders; The Killings at Badger's Drift as Counsellor 2 in 1997 (edited out of some versions), Written in Blood as Mrs Bundy in 1998, Death's Shadow as Mrs Bundy again in 1999 and Judgement Day as Mrs Foster in 2000.

In 1999, Sidaway played as Marge Beake in a one off ITV drama, Hunting Venus, the mother of Charlotte (formally known as Charlie) after Simon Delancey, played by Martin Clunes, enquirers on the whereabouts of Charlotte. In 2001, she was cast as Mrs Dorothy Barker in the ITV prison drama Bad Girls. Between 2016 and 2019, Sidaway played Maureen in the BBC sitcom Mum.

Sidaway's other television roles include parts in Lovejoy, Casualty, Doctors, Holby City, Heartbeat, Andy Robson, Miss Marple, All Creatures Great and Small, Jeeves and Wooster, The Bill, The Vicar of Dibley, Foyle's War, The Inspector Lynley Mysteries, Doc Martin, Survivors, and Being Human.

== Film roles ==
Sidaway's film appearances include roles in Me and Orson Welles, Beautiful Thing, I Want Candy, Goodnight Mister Tom, Blackball, Tom's Midnight Garden, Ready When You Are Mr. McGill, Silence Is Golden, All Men Are Mortal, The Magic Toyshop and The Quiz Kid. She played the role of Jean in the 2018 film Sink.

== Personal life ==
Sidaway was Secretary of the International Brigade Memorial Trust, before becoming President, succeeding Jack Jones upon his death. The Trust commemorates the volunteers who enlisted to fight Fascism in the Spanish Civil War. She has lived in Stratford, in the London Borough of Newham, since 1983, after living in Manchester for seven years. Her hobbies include her daily walk to West Ham Park.

Sidaway lived with her partner, David Marshall, from 1990 until his death in 2005. Marshall fought in the Spanish Civil War and had also been a member of the Brigade.

== Filmography ==
Year	Title	Channel	Role
1977	The Ghosts of Motley Hall	ITV	Mrs Osborn
1979	Quest of Eagles	ITV	Mrs Koslawski
1982–1983	Andy Robson	ITV	Florrie Charlton
1984	Shine on Harvey Moon	ITV	Mrs Sprake
1989	Capstick's Law	ITV	Peggy
1990–1992	Coronation Street	ITV	Brenda Taylor
1995	Pride and Prejudice	BBC One	Hill
1996	Accused	BBC One	Dee Yearwood
1997	Midsomer Murders	ITV	Councillor 2
1998–1999	Midsomer Murders	ITV	Mrs Bundy
1999	Hunting Venus	ITV	Marge Beake
2000	Midsomer Murders	ITV	Mrs Foster
2001	Bad Girls	ITV	Mrs Dorothy Barker
2017	Doc Martin	ITV	Mary Rawlings
2018	Sink	N/A	Jean
2018	In The Long Run	Sky One	Dot
2019	Holby City	BBC One	Josie O'Grady
2016–2019	Mum	BBC Two	Maureen
2020	Shakespeare & Hathaway: Private Investigators	BBC	Bo Quickly (S3:E1)
2021	Doctors	Maud Southcliffe	Episode: "Locked In"
