= Countdown to Danger =

1967 British film by Peter Seabourne

- Directed by: Peter Seabourne
- Screenplay by: Peter Seabourne
- Produced by: A. Frank Bundy
- Cinematography: Ian Struthers
- Edited by: Peter Seabourne
- Music by: Eric Rogers
- Production company: Wallace Productions
- Release date: 1967
- Running time: 63 minutes
- Country: United Kingdom
- Language: English

Countdown to Danger is a 1967 British children's adventure film directed and written by Peter Seabourne and starring David Macalister, Paul Martin, Angela Lee and Penny Spencer. It was produced by A. Frank Bundy for the Children's Film Foundation.

== Plot ==
While on holiday in the Channel Islands, young Tony falls into a cave through the roof of an old store of German wartime mines and accidentally activates one of them, which starts its countdown, ticking towards detonation. Knowing he is trapped, his friends Sue, Mike and Sandie enlist the help of Bomb Disposal Officer Captain Wright, also on holiday on the islands. Wright is unable to enter the store so talks Tony through deactivating the mine, racing against time.

== Cast ==
- David Macalister as Mike
- Paul Martin as Tony
- Angela Lee as Sandie
- Penny Spencer as Sue
- Richard Coleman as Captain Wright
- Lane Meddick as Sergeant Thompson
- Frank Williams as Harry

== Release ==
As well as being shown theatrically, it was also broadcast as part of the American TV series CBS Children's Film Festival (1967–1984).

== Reception ==
The Monthly Film Bulletin wrote: "Junior league version of the bomb disposal suspense set-up, authentically filmed on Channel Island locations. After setting the scene with some brief instruction on the mechanism of mines, the film develops into a simple exercise in tension, dramatic enough to keep most children on the edge of their seats."

Kine Weekly wrote: "This is a rather more adult story than some made for the CFF and it has quite a gripping line in suspense. ... Except for certain obvious simplifications of the plot, this could pass as a supporting feature in most situations. The dangerous situation that the lad Tony gets into is quite plausible and the subsequent rescue operations (with the mine ticking away ominously) mount a sufficiently holding degree of tension. There is s light relief in the form of an amiable but inefficient local inhabitant and the colour photography of the island has a quietly pleasant charm. ... The explosions are impressive."

TV Guide wrote: "Just for the kids".
