= Hunting Venus =

Television comedy-drama

- Genre: Comedy drama
- Written by: Nick Vivian
- Directed by: Martin Clunes
- Composer: Jools Holland

Production
- Executive producer: David Reynolds
- Producer: Philippa Braithwaite
- Cinematography: Paul Wheeler
- Editor: Hugh Boyson
- Running time: 115 minutes
- Production company: Buffalo Pictures for Yorkshire Television

Original release
- Network: ITV
- Release: 31 March 1999

Hunting Venus is a British television comedy drama starring Martin Clunes and Neil Morrissey as former members of a 1980s new romantic pop group. The one-off drama was broadcast on ITV on 31 March 1999, and was produced by Buffalo Pictures for Yorkshire Television.

The plot follows former pop-star turned con artist, Simon Delancey (Clunes), who is kidnapped by two fans of his eighties band the Venus Hunters, and is blackmailed to re-form the band for one final performance, live on television.

It features cameos from a number of new romantic pop stars, including Simon Le Bon (with his wife Yasmin Le Bon), Tony Hadley, Gary Numan, and Phil Oakey. Jools Holland also appears, as himself, and also wrote the song "Starburst", The Venus Hunters' biggest hit.

A compilation album was also released by Columbia to accompany the drama featuring songs from the 1980s. The Hunting Venus song "Starburst" was included.

== Cast ==
- Martin Clunes ... Simon Delancey
- Neil Morrissey ... Charlotte
- Jane Horrocks ... Cassandra
- Esther Coles ... Jacqui
- Daniel Webb ... John
- Mark Williams ... Peter
- Ben Miller ... Gavin
- Marlene Sidaway ... Marge Beake
- Roger Watkins ... DI Hoardes
- Jean Ainslie ... Lovely Old Lady
- Ian Gain ... Car Dealer
- Dermot Keaney ... Doctor
- John Mackle ... Production Assistant
- Stephen Churchett ... Antiques Dealer
- Laura Heath ... Peter's Secretary

== Reception ==
Sam Wollaston of The Guardian felt the film "started promisingly" and "ended splendidly", however concluded that Hunting Venus "didn't really work because it's asking too much of one joke to keep it going for nearly two hours, and pastiche isn't that funny anyway, is it?" He added: "When you've got Martin Clunes and Neil Morrissey in something, you expect it to be as good as Men Behaving Badly. Which it wasn't. And Jane Horrocks as Cassandra was better than both of them."

Robert Hanks of The Independent commented that the film had a lot of "incidental pleasures" along with "one or two deft jokes about the 1980s - plus a handful of star cameos". However, he felt that the film "seemed oddly short of allusions" to the 1980s and contained "some very old-fashioned attitudes". Hanks summarised: "What the film did get right was the way that nostalgia lends cheap music its potency, and elevates our personal tragedies over world events - for the characters here, the summer of 1982 was about losing your virginity and "Hungry Like the Wolf" getting into the charts, not about the Falklands War. But it didn't need to take two hours to make that point; this was a story of lost times in a way it didn't intend."
