= Accused (1996 TV series) =

- Genre: Legal drama
- Directed by: Indra Bhose; Rob Evans; Jo Johnson; Gwennan Sage
- Starring: Nicholas R. Bailey; Davyd Harries; Marlene Sidaway; Lloyd Johnston; David Telfer; Kate Lynn Evans; Frances Grey; Beverly Hills; Geoffrey Hutchings; Peggy Sinclair
- Country of origin: United Kingdom
- Original language: English
- No. of series: 1
- No. of episodes: 8

Production
- Producer: Diana Kyle
- Running time: 30 minutes
- Production company: BBC

Original release
- Network: BBC1
- Release: 3 November – 23 December 1996

Accused is a British television legal drama series, starring Nicholas R. Bailey, that first broadcast on 3 November 1996. Each episode follows a single case in a busy magistrates' court. A single run of eight episodes aired throughout November and December 1996 on BBC1, airing in a late night slot on Sundays, before moving to Mondays midway through the series. The series was produced by Diana Kyle, and co-starred Davyd Harries, Marlene Sidaway, Lloyd Johnston and David Telfer.

== Cast ==
- Nicholas R. Bailey as Jack Vincent
- Davyd Harries as Derek Gravett
- Marlene Sidaway as Dee Yearwood
- Lloyd Johnston as Paul Harper
- David Telfer as Gerry Harrison
- Kate Lynn Evans as Susan Bellamy
- Frances Grey as Jenny Roach
- Beverly Hills as Liz Walton
- Geoffrey Hutchings as Dan Chapman
- Peggy Sinclair as Jocelyn Halliday

== Episodes ==
No.	Title	Directed by	Written by	British air date
1	"Joyce"	Rob Evans	Christopher Reason	3 November 1996
Duty solicitor Antony Mackie's client insists on pleading guilty to heroin possession, even though she is innocent.
2	"Billy"	Rob Evans	Carolyn Sally Jones	10 November 1996
Until now, Billy's criminal antics have given everyone a good laugh, but this is his first time in an adult court.
3	"Carol"	Indra Bhose	Andrew Bernhardt & Allan Swift	17 November 1996
Carol is charged with assault for throwing boiling water over her ex-boyfriend.
4	"Lewis"	Indra Bhose	Maurice Bessman	24 November 1996
A "bit of fun" lands Lewis in court accused of indecent assault.
5	"Mike"	Gwennan Sage	Carolyn Sally Jones	2 December 1996
A successful businessman is accused of stealing a few pounds worth of goods from a store.
6	"Kirkpatrick"	Jo Johnson	Christopher Reason	9 December 1996
Ralph Kingsley attempts to undermine the only witness to a case of careless driving which killed a woman.
7	"Mukesh"	Jo Johnson	Maurice Bessman	16 December 1996
Mukesh appears in court charged with common assault, and only his brother Vijay's evidence can save him – but Vijay is being intimidated.
8	"George"	Gwennan Sage	Andrew Bernhardt & Allan Swift	23 December 1996
A man is charged with actual bodily harm against his hated son-in-law.
