= Spearhead (TV series) =

British TV drama series (1978–1981)

- Genre: Drama
- Created by: Nick McCarty
- Theme music composer: Anthony Isaac
- Country of origin: United Kingdom
- Original language: English
- No. of series: 3
- No. of episodes: 19

Production
- Executive producer: Lewis Rudd
- Producer: James Ormerod
- Running time: 48-54 minute episodes
- Production company: Southern Television

Original release
- Network: ITV
- Release: 18 July 1978 – 3 September 1981

Spearhead is a British television drama series. Produced by Southern Television and broadcast on the ITV network, it ran for a total of three series and 19 episodes from 18 July 1978 to 3 September 1981. It featured the daily lives of a group of soldiers in 'B' Company, 1st Battalion Royal Wessex Rangers, a fictional British Army infantry regiment.

== Themes ==
The programme shows how, in the late 1970s, the British Army had the task of trying to keep the peace in Northern Ireland and also maintained garrisons in Germany and Hong Kong. It also dramatises the inflexible class divisions in the army of the time. The 'glass ceiling' for even the most able soldiers of working-class origin, like Colour Sergeant Jackson, is shown to be a barrier to achieving advancement from non-commissioned to commissioned officer. Early episodes of the series show the army in an unfavourable light; two episodes deal with a petty thief who has a gambling habit, and another deals with an enlisted man going AWOL, with Jackson trying to get him back. Particularly controversial is an episode set in Northern Ireland, where some soldiers are portrayed as advocating a less aggressive campaign against all hostile civilians (including women and children).

Through the run of the series, the Royal Wessex Rangers were posted to a number of locations, including Northern Ireland, West Germany with British Army of the Rhine, and as the resident battalion in Hong Kong.

== Episode guide ==
=== Series 1 ===
The leading character in the first series is Colour Sergeant "Jacko" Jackson (Michael Billington). In the opening episode, the Royal Wessex Rangers are completing a tour of duty in Northern Ireland. Jackson is a member of the battalion's recce platoon charged with close reconnaissance of Provisional IRA terrorist suspects. When the battalion completes its tour, it returns to the mainland UK and is based at barracks in Tidworth, Wiltshire, where it is the British Army's "spearhead" battalion - an infantry battalion kept at short readiness for deployment worldwide. The battalion CO decides that each company in the battalion will have one platoon commanded by a non-commissioned officer. The OC of B Company, Major Taylor, accepts the recommendation of his 2ic, Captain Billings, to appoint Jackson as OC of 6 Platoon.

Episode #	Original Air Date (UK)	Episode Title	Director	Writer	Cast
1-01	18 July 1978	Suspect	James Ormerod	Nick McCarty	Michael Billington, Stafford Gordon, Roy Holder
1-02	25 July 1978	Leave	Derek Martinus	Nick McCarty	Michael Billington, Stafford Gordon, Roy Holder
1-03	1 August 1978	Loyalties	James Ormerod	Nick McCarty	Michael Billington, Stafford Gordon, Roy Holder
1-04	8 August 1978	Jackal	Derek Martinus	Nick McCarty	Michael Billington, Stafford Gordon, Roy Holder
1-05	15 August 1978	Both Ends Against the Middle	James Ormerod	Nick McCarty	Michael Billington, Stafford Gordon, Roy Holder
1-06	22 August 1978	Thieves in the Night	Derek Martinus	Nick McCarty	Michael Billington, Stafford Gordon, Roy Holder
1-07	29 August 1978	Truth Games	James Ormerod	Nick McCarty	Michael Billington, Stafford Gordon, Roy Holder

=== Series 2: Spearhead (in Germany ... still billed onscreen as just 'Spearhead') ===
In this series, Colour Sergeant Jackson has his position of OC of 6 Platoon took over by 2nd lieutenant Pickering, a young and naive officer. The series for the most part deals with Army life in Germany, except from the last episode which is set during a tour in Northern Ireland.

Episode #	Original Air Date (UK)	Episode Title	Director	Writer	Cast
2-01	18 June 1979	New Brooms	James Ormerod	Nick McCarty	Stafford Gordon, Roy Holder, Robin Davies
2-02	25 June 1979	Matrimony	James Ormerod	Nick McCarty	Stafford Gordon, Roy Holder, Robin Davies
2-03	2 July 1979	Pressures	James Ormerod	Nick McCarty	Stafford Gordon, Roy Holder, Robin Davies
2-04	9 July 1979	Leave Takers	James Ormerod	Nick McCarty	Stafford Gordon, Roy Holder, Robin Davies
2-05	16 July 1979	Repercussions	James Ormerod	Nick McCarty	Stafford Gordon, Roy Holder, Robin Davies
2-06	23 July 1979	Waiting Games	James Ormerod	Nick McCarty	Stafford Gordon, Roy Holder, Robin Davies

=== Series 3: Spearhead in Hong Kong ===
Episode #	Original Air Date (UK)	Episode Title	Director	Writer	Cast
3-01	30 July 1981	Night Games	Derek Martinus	Nick McCarty	Stafford Gordon, Roy Holder
3-02	6 August 1981	Have a Happy Day	James Ormerod	James Ormerod	Stafford Gordon, Roy Holder
3-03	13 August 1981	Another Happy Day	James Ormerod	James Ormerod and Nick McCarty	Stafford Gordon, Roy Holder
3-04	20 August 1981	The Macau Connection	Derek Martinus	James Ormerod	Stafford Gordon, Roy Holder
3-05	27 August 1981	Loyalties	Derek Martinus	Nick McCarty	Stafford Gordon, Roy Holder
3-06	3 September 1981	Futures	James Ormerod	Nick McCarty	Stafford Gordon, Roy Holder

== Royal Wessex Rangers ==
The Royal Wessex Rangers is a fictional British infantry regiment portrayed in the series. It is portrayed as a standard infantry battalion in the British Army during the late 1970s. During the three-year run of the show, the regiment is shown in different roles on different postings; to begin with, the battalion is on an operational tour of Northern Ireland at the height of The Troubles as light infantry, during which one of the sergeants of the battalion's 'B' Company, Colour Sergeant 'Jacko' Jackson (played by Michael Billington) is chosen to become a temporary platoon commander, even though he is only an NCO. Subsequently, the battalion is posted first as a mechanised infantry battalion to West Germany as part of BAOR, then as a resident light infantry battalion to Hong Kong.

The regiment is titled as a regiment of rangers; this distinguishes it from the majority of real infantry regiments in the British Army at the time (the only regiment of rangers at the time was the Royal Irish Rangers).

As the regiment has the geographical name Wessex in its name and Gibraltar keep on its cap badge, it may be assumed that it is from the west of England, and its forebears were at the Great Siege of Gibraltar. It may also be assumed that the regiment is part of the Prince of Wales' Division, even thought the Wessex Rangers cap badge is a copy of the Northamptonshire Regiment cap badge, with the Gibraltar and Talavera scrolls changed and a crown added.

== Syndication ==
The series was screened on British movie channel Talking Pictures TV in 2016, with a further screening which commenced in December 2018.
