= Holmwood, Binfield Heath =

Country house in Binfield Heath, Oxfordshire, England

Coordinates: 51°29′59″N 0°55′17″W

Holmwood is a country house in the village of Binfield Heath in Oxfordshire, England.

It is situated on Shiplake Row in the village of Binfield Heath near Henley-on-Thames in Oxfordshire. The house is 14,200 sq ft in size with 11 en suite bedrooms. The house is set over 26.6 acres of grounds with an infinity swimming pool, sauna and tennis court. The house has three 3-bedroom cottages. It was built in the early 18th-century, and was subsequently altered later that century. The house has been listed Grade II on the National Heritage List for England since February 1985.

It was owned by Admiral Charles Swinburne in the 19th century and was the family home of Swinburne's son, the poet Algernon Swinburne. For many years Holmwood was owned by the Makower family. In April 1981 the 'remaining contents' of Holmwood were sold in an auction at the house by John Moritz Makower at Sotheby's. The sale included English furniture, paintings and porcelain.

Subsequently, Holmwood passed to Brian and Wendy Talfourd-Cook, who maintained it as a private home until departing the village in 2007.

It was owned by the barrister and peer Jonathan Marks, Baron Marks of Henley-on-Thames from 2008 to 2019 and restored by him. The house was put up for sale through Savills in November 2018 for £11.25 million. In 2019 the house was bought by Rupert Murdoch and Jerry Hall for £11 million. Murdoch and Hall divorced in 2022 with Hall keeping Holmwood in the divorce settlement.
