= Wood Norton Hall =

Country house in Worcestershire, United Kingdom

Coordinates: 52°7.333′N 1°58.602′W

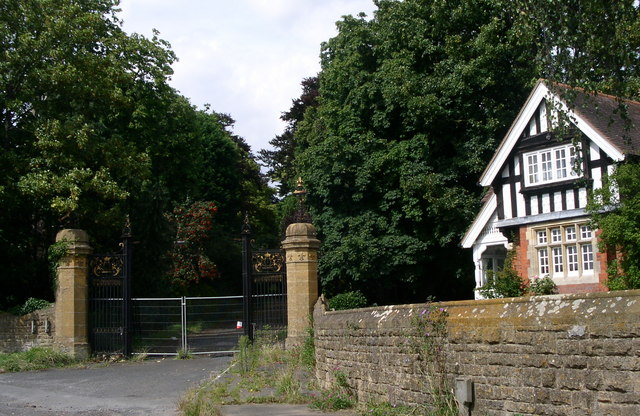
The entrance gate to Wood Norton Hall

Wood Norton Hall is a Grade II* listed Victorian stately home to the northwest of Evesham, Worcestershire, England. It was the last home in England of Prince Philippe, Duke of Orléans, who claimed the throne of France.

Used by the BBC during World War II as an emergency broadcasting centre and a station for listening to enemy radio broadcasts, it became the accommodation for the BBC's engineering training college that grew up in its grounds. The BBC retained purpose-built facilities in the grounds for technical training after selling the Hall, which became a hotel.

== History ==
The site of a dwelling since medieval times, Wood Norton was once the home of Prince Philippe, Duke of Orléans, a pretender to the throne of France. The 'Great Gates' at the entrance to the estate had once stood before York House in Twickenham, the Duke's previous home.

Its situation, hidden within acres of remote woodland on a hill facing south, made Wood Norton ideal for official use in the event of war. The BBC bought the site in early 1939 so that its operations could be relocated away from London and other urban centres in the event of hostilities. A number of temporary buildings were quickly erected around the hall to provide an emergency broadcasting centre. A dozen studios were built, and by 1940 Wood Norton was one of the largest broadcasting centres in Europe with an average output of 1,300 programmes a week.

Many refugees from all over war-torn Europe were recruited and then billeted in Evesham and the surrounding area; they became specialised broadcasters to the Resistance and special operations groups around Europe, sending their secret messages encrypted into what appeared to be normal entertainment broadcasts.

Wood Norton was the home of the BBC's Monitoring Service (Note: The formal name was shortened to "BBC Monitoring" in the 1980s.) from August 1939 until early 1943, when Monitoring moved to Caversham Park and Crowsley Park, near Reading. The move was made to release space at Wood Norton so it could be used as the BBC's main broadcasting centre, should London have to be evacuated because of the threat from Germany's long-range V-weapons. The Hall's upper storeys were destroyed by a fire in 1942. The roof was repaired and reinstated by the BBC Architectural and Civil Engineering Department in 1991 to 1992.

After the war, Wood Norton became the home of the BBC Engineering Training Department. During the Cold War it was designated as a broadcasting centre in the event of a nuclear attack.

In March 2013, the BBC vacated Television Centre (TVC) in West London, requiring strategic relocation of operations. The Satellite Earth Station (SES) was constructed at Wood Norton to relocate shared infrastructure previously housed at TVC.

== The nuclear bunker ==
In 1966, and into the late 1960s, Bredon Wing was built as an addition to the training centre, containing a 175-foot-long (53 m) nuclear fallout bunker beneath it. A mast was constructed on top of the hill behind the hall and was fitted with an SHF dish (microwave link) to Daventry radio transmitting station (referred to in 1975 Cabinet papers released 30 December 2005).

Two VHF yagi aerials were fitted to receive signals from the transmitters at Holme Moss and Llandrindod Wells. Later, another SHF link was fitted to the Pebble Mill studios in Birmingham, to provide reliable TV reception for the technical training facilities as the local terrestrial TV signal was poor.

The bunker (known as PAWN – Protected Area Wood Norton) and mast, and many other installations, were referred to as "deferred facilities" within the BBC. Few staff knew their full extent and those that did had to be vetted by the Ministry of Defence and sign the Official Secrets Act (OSA). However, in the 1970s when training studio space was at a premium at Wood Norton, the bunker was opened up and made available for general training use. Staff on site were disappointed to discover that it was only two storeys deep.

The "deferred facilities" were modified many times over the years. In the 1970s they were extended and updated to be able to provide the "Wartime Broadcasting Service".

== BBC Academy ==
The estate has been the home of the BBC's Engineering Training Department since the war, now branded as part of the College of Technology, a constituent of the wider BBC Academy. Training staff run residential courses on-site, travel to deliver courses at other sites in the UK, and design interactive courses for use on the BBC's internal network.

Because of its convenience as a BBC facility, Wood Norton was used for some of the filming of the 1970 Doctor Who serial Spearhead from Space. The production team used the site due to a BBC strike which prevented them from recording on videotape in studio, hence why it is the only serial from Doctor Who's 1963-89 run to be shot entirely on film as opposed to the more usual combination of both film and videotape. The filming included location shots inside the secret nuclear bunker (the scenes of Brigadier Lethbridge-Stewart's office and The Doctor's laboratory), and all those who were involved with filming in those areas were required to abide by the Official Secrets Act and disclose no information about the bunker's existence. Wood Norton was later used for all of the location filming of the 1974 serial Robot, though on that occasion permission to use the bunker for filming was refused.

In 1979 part of the BBC's adaptation of the final episode of John le Carré's "Tinker Tailor Soldier Spy" was shot there. The medical centre and old student's accommodation were used to represent a holding cell for Bill Haydon "Tailor" (Ian Richardson) at Sarratt whilst he was being interrogated by the inquisitors. Little set dressing was required as, at the time of shooting, the student accommodation in D Block was rather like a prison cell.

Under the leadership of Greg Dyke and Resources director Mike Southgate, the BBC sold off the residential accommodation used by trainees, which had been built by the corporation 20 years previously.

Wood Norton Hall itself was a privately owned hotel and conference centre, but closed in 2005, reopening under new management the following year. The hotel finally ceased trading in 2010, was sold to a London investor in 2011, underwent a £4m renovation and reopened in November 2012 as a member of the Bespoke Hotels Group, however it is no longer affiliated with the group. The BBC retains its Technical and Operational Training Centre in the extensive grounds.
