= ...And Mother Makes Three =

- David Parfitt, Wendy Craig, Robin Davies
- Genre: Sitcom
- Created by: Richard Waring
- Starring: Wendy Craig; Robin Davies; David Parfitt; Valerie Lush; George Selway; Richard Coleman
- Country of origin: United Kingdom
- Original language: English
- No. of series: 4
- No. of episodes: 26

Production
- Running time: 30 minutes
- Production company: Thames Television

Original release
- Network: ITV
- Release: 27 April 1971 – 27 June 1973

Related
- ...And Mother Makes Five

...And Mother Makes Three is a British sitcom shown on ITV from 27 April 1971 to 27 June 1973. Starring Wendy Craig, it was written by Peter Buchanan, Peter Robinson, David Cumming, Derek Collyer, Myra Taylor, Lawrie Wyman, George Evans, Richard Waring and Carla Lane. It was made for the ITV network by Thames Television.

== Cast ==
- Wendy Craig – Sally Harrison
- Robin Davies – Simon Harrison
- David Parfitt – Peter Harrison
- Valerie Lush – Auntie (Florence Massey)
- George Selway – Mr Campbell
- Richard Coleman – David Redway (series 3 and 4)
- Nicholas Hawell – Jeremy
- Julie Dawn Cole – Arabella (series 1 and 2)
- Gwen Nelson – Sally's Mum
- Miriam Mann – Jane Redway (series 3 and 4)
- Keith Marsh – Sally's Dad
- Richard Thorp – Stanley Marsh

== Plot ==
Newly widowed mother Sally Harrison is trying to hold down a job as an assistant to Mr Campbell, a veterinarian. Her children are Simon and Peter, and her aunt lives with them and tries to help. In Series 3 Mr Campbell moves to Scotland and the vet premises is taken over by divorcee David Redway, an antique bookseller who has a daughter, Jane. David and Sally fall in love.

== Episodes ==
=== Series One (1971) ===
1. "Simon's Holiday" (27 April 1971) Written by Peter Buchanan and Peter Robinson.
2. "Birthday Bike" (4 May 1971) Written by Peter Buchanan and Peter Robinson.
3. "A Bird in the Hand" (11 May 1971) Written by Peter Buchanan and Peter Robinson.
4. "Get Mobile" (18 May 1971) Written by Peter Buchanan and Peter Robinson.
5. "School for Love" (25 May 1971) Written by Peter Buchanan and Peter Robinson.
6. "Pound of Flesh" (1 June 1971) Written by Peter Buchanan and Peter Robinson.
7. "Mr Mum" (8 June 1971) Written by Peter Buchanan and Peter Robinson.

=== Series Two (1971–72) ===
1. "A Hard Day Out" (2 December 1971) Written by David Cumming and Derek Collyer.
2. "The Matchmakers" (9 December 1971) Written by Carla Lane and Myra Taylor.
3. "Growing Pains" (16 December 1971) Written by Peter Robinson and Peter Buchanan.
4. "But How Can I Tell Them?" (23 December 1971) Written by Lawrie Wyman and George Evans.
5. "Once A Year Day" (30 December 1971)
6. "All Play and No Work" (6 January 1972)

=== Short Special (1971) ===
- Part of Mike and Bernie Winters' All-Star Christmas Comedy Carnival (25 December 1971)

=== Series Three (1972) ===
1. "Gather Ye Mushrooms While Ye May" (14 September 1972)
2. "Father Figure" (21 September 1972)
3. "Girl Talk" (28 September 1972)
4. "Thank Heaven for Little Girls?" (5 October 1972)
5. "A Family Affair" (12 October 1972)
6. "Two Hearts That Beat As Two" (19 October 1972)

=== Series Four (1973) ===
1. "Wedding Talk" (16 May 1973)
2. "Homes, Sweet Homes" (23 May 1973)
3. "A Home and A Job" (30 May 1973)
4. "The Eve of the Day" (6 June 1973) Written by Richard Waring.
5. "And Father Makes Five" (13 June 1973) Written by Richard Waring.
6. "Starting Trouble" (20 June 1973) Written by Richard Waring.
7. "The Honeymoon's Over" (27 June 1973) Written by Richard Waring.

== DVD releases ==
All four series have been released on DVD in the United Kingdom (Region 2) by Network DVD. A 4-disc set of the complete series has also been released.

DVD	Release date
The Complete Series 1	31 March 2008
The Complete Series 2	24 September 2008
The Complete Series 3	22 June 2009
The Complete Series 4	19 July 2010
The Complete Series 1 to 4 Box Set	8 November 2010

== ...And Mother Makes Five ==
In the fourth series of ...And Mother Makes Three Sally Harrison marries David Redway, leading to a sequel called ...And Mother Makes Five.
