= A Moment in Time (novel) =

1964 novel by H. E. Bates

- First edition (UK)
- Author: H. E. Bates
- Language: English
- Publisher: Michael Joseph (UK); Farrar, Straus & Co (US)
- Publication date: 1964
- Publication place: United Kingdom
- Media type: Print
- Pages: 248

A Moment in Time is a 1964 novel written by English author H. E. Bates. He based the setting for most of the story on Shopswyke House, a Georgian mansion in Tangmere, West Sussex to which Bates himself was assigned.

== Plot Introduction ==
In the summer of 1940, 19-year-old Elizabeth Cartwright lives a secluded and privileged life in a village in Kent. Her world is turned upside down with the arrival of a group of RAF officers who requisition her family home as a base. She immediately falls for Bill Ogilvie with an old sports-car, then marries 'Splodge' but the life of an RAF pilot is a dangerous one as it comes as no real surprise when tragedy strikes.

== Reception ==
Reviews were mixed:

- Aileen Pippett in The New York Times writes 'Mr. Bates, writing here at the top of his form, has caught the spirit of those desperate days and rendered it in scenes that are both tender and magnificent'
- The Times Literary Supplement as true of most other reviews, criticized Bates for turning 'the Battle of Britain into a gay summer frolic in a pastoral setting.'
- Dean R. Baldwin in his book H.E. Bates: A Literary Life writes 'the novel is a slender story centring on Elizabeth, her grandmother, her silly uncle, half a dozen pilots, and one of their wives, Doll. There is a great deal of RAF slang, partying, stiff-upper-lip stoicism and female understanding. Superficially the novel strikes the right note, but it is a one-fingered melody, tinkling and shallow.'

== Adaptation ==
It was adapted into a 4-part television mini-series in 1979 for the BBC starring Alison Elliott as Elizabeth, John Moulder-Brown as Bill Ogilvie, and Robin Davies as Splodge
