= Crowsley Park =

Country estate in South Oxfordshire, England

Coordinates: 51°30′47″N 0°57′08″W

Crowsley Park is a 160-acre (65 ha) country estate in South Oxfordshire, central-southern England, owned by the British Broadcasting Corporation (BBC).

== Overview ==
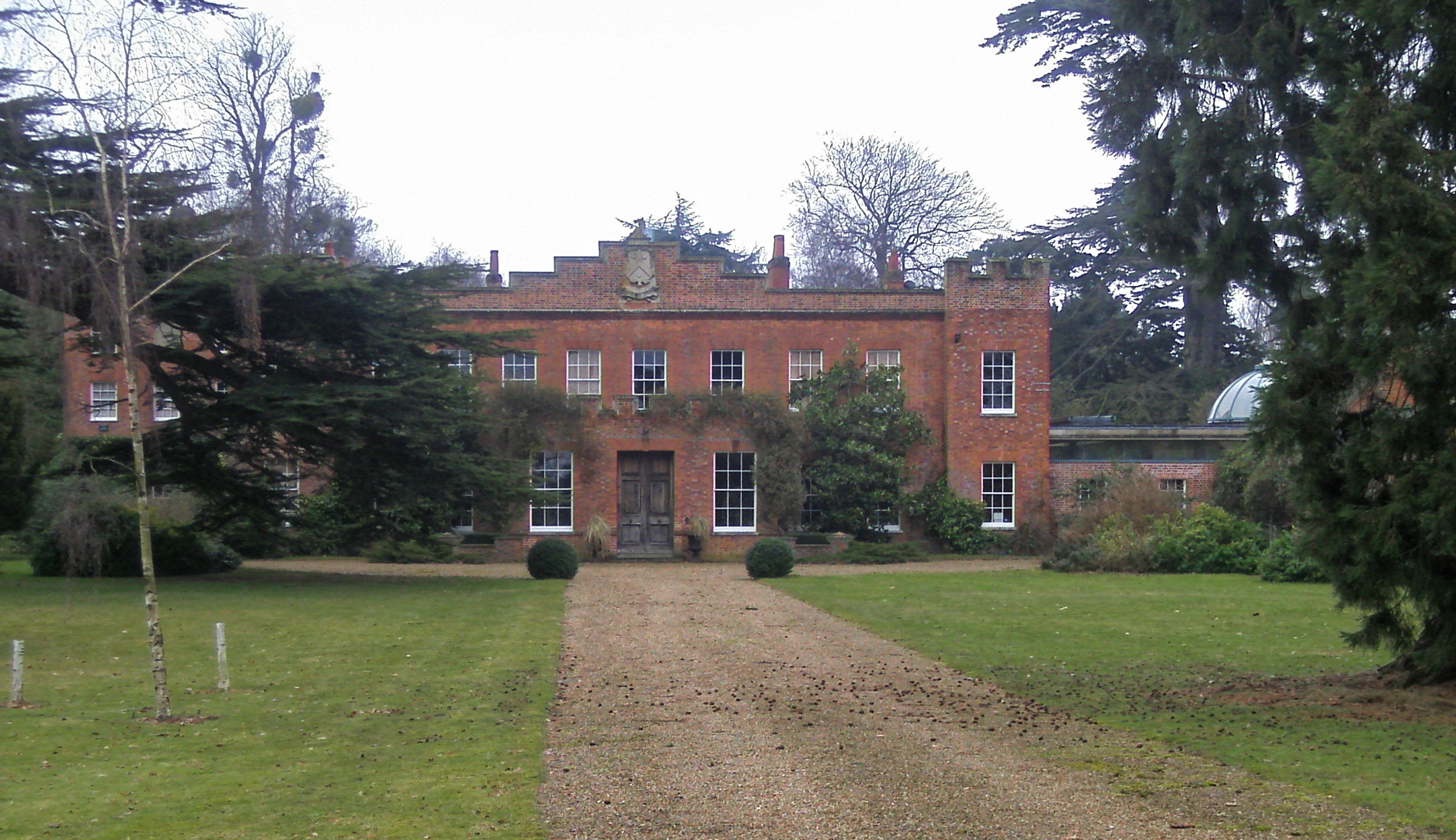
Crowsley Park House

Since the Second World War, Crowsley Park has been the site of a signals-receiving station used by BBC Monitoring, based until May 2018 at Caversham Park, three miles (5 km) to the south. The Crowsley receiving facility is now an outstation of BBC Monitoring's new HQ at London's Broadcasting House.

Crowsley Park House, an 18th-century mansion house, sits in its own grounds within the estate and is now a private residence. Smaller houses on the estate — South Lodge (at the main entrance to the park), North Lodge, Keeper's Cottage and Crowsley Park Lodge — are also privately occupied. The main house is Grade II listed on the National Heritage List for England. In addition to the house, the stable and coach house and the grotto in the grounds of the house are also Grade II listed.

Woodland on the eastern and northern sides of the park, known as Crowsley Park Woods, is leased to the Forestry Commission.

The remainder of the estate consists of wooded parkland used as cattle and horse pasture. Three (formerly four) very large (11-metre diameter) satellite dishes used by the BBC are on the north side of the estate. Until 2014, there were also many traditional radio aerials (antennas) spread across the park.

The BBC leases the estate to private tenants, operating its receiving station from a modern building erected for the purpose near the centre of the park.

Crowsley Park's history includes an association with Sir Arthur Conan Doyle, author of the Sherlock Holmes detective stories.

== Location ==
Despite being only two miles (3 km) north of the edge of the large town of Reading, and a similar distance southwest of the smaller town of Henley-on-Thames, Crowsley Park lies in a quiet rural setting, close to the southwest end of the Chiltern Hills. It is within the Chilterns Area of Outstanding Natural Beauty.

The quietness of the location, especially the absence of electrical noise, was among the factors that drew the BBC to the site.

In 2003, the hamlet of Crowsley became part of the newly created civil parish of Binfield Heath. Until then, both Crowsley and Binfield Heath had been part of the civil parish of Shiplake. Crowsley is about 40 miles (64 km) west of central London.

== BBC receiving station ==
Crowsley Park and Caversham Park were acquired by the BBC during the Second World War. In April 1943, the BBC moved the headquarters of its Monitoring Service (Note: The formal name was shortened to "BBC Monitoring" in 1988.) from Wood Norton Hall, near Evesham in Worcestershire, to Caversham Park, with Crowsley Park acting as the service's receiving station, picking up radio broadcasts from Nazi Germany and many other countries.

Shortwave, mediumwave and longwave receivers were installed in a rudimentary building at Crowsley put up some distance from the main house. The signals received were fed down telephone lines to Caversham to be listened to by monitoring staff. A more permanent building was later erected for the receiving station.

In 1974, the BBC's separate, and larger, receiving station at Tatsfield, on the North Downs south of London, was closed and its functions merged with the facility at Crowsley. (Note: The Tatsfield station, which had been established in 1929, ten years before the Monitoring Service, was substantially larger than the Crowsley operation. It was formally known as the BBC Engineering Measurement and Receiving Station.) The Crowsley station was expanded to accommodate the equipment and staff transferred from Tatsfield. Following the merger, Crowsley was formally known as the "BBC Receiving Station" to reflect the range of work it did for various parts of the BBC (in addition to Monitoring) and other international broadcasters. This name is no longer used.

As part of an engineering upgrade in the 1980s, a number of satellite dishes were installed, joining the Beverage and rhombic aerials and curtain arrays already on the site. Additional rhombic aerials were erected to boost shortwave reception from the Middle East and North Africa, alongside those already used for signals from Europe and the Soviet Union, the latter having been the station's priority target during the Cold War. One of the two curtain aerials (which had been used for the relaying by the BBC of the Voice of America) was taken down. (Note: VOA shortwave transmissions from the USA were received at Crowsley and fed to the BBC transmitting station at Woofferton to be rebroadcast to their target audiences.) The remaining curtain aerial was taken down in more recent years.

With the decline in the use of shortwave in radio broadcasting, all of the Beverage and rhombic aerials were taken down in July 2014.

In 2018, the BBC began a further modernisation of the facility, including the installation of 18 new satellite dishes. The modernisation coincided with the closure of the BBC's Caversham Park base and the transfer of BBC Monitoring's HQ to London.

== The Baskerville legacy ==
Among Crowsley Park's former owners were the Baskerville family, one of whose members, Henry Baskerville, was High Sheriff of Oxfordshire in 1847. Stories about the family and its association with fierce dogs were among the inspirations for Conan Doyle's The Hound of the Baskervilles (published 1901–02) in which "Sir Henry Baskerville" is a leading character.

The connection with the Baskervilles is preserved in statues of hellhounds with spears through their mouths which sit on the stone gateposts at the entrance to the park and atop the front of Crowsley Park House.

A pub in the nearby village of Lower Shiplake is called The Baskerville Arms.

== Public access ==
The estate is closed to public vehicular traffic and neither Crowsley Park House nor the BBC station are open to the public. However, the park is crossed by two public footpaths. The western path (starting from the main entrance), which is part of the southern extension to the Chiltern Way, gives a clear view of the house. There is a distant view of the house, through an ornamental avenue of trees, from the public road junction at the southwest corner of the park. The three very large satellite dishes mentioned above are visible from the public road (Devil's Hill) that forms the northern boundary of the park.

The Forestry Commission woodland is open to the public, including access along a public bridleway.

== Miscellaneous ==
Crowsley was once spelt Crouchley, suggesting that the first syllable of Crowsley may once have been pronounced to rhyme with cow or crew. Today, Crowsley is pronounced with the first four letters sounding the same as the bird.

Parts of the final story of the BBC television science-fiction drama series Doctor Who to feature Tom Baker as the Doctor, 'Logopolis', were filmed in the grounds of Crowsley Park in December 1980. In one scene, the Doctor climbs the tower that once carried the BBC receiving station's VHF and UHF aerials. Crowsley Park was used as a visual substitute for Jodrell Bank by the production team due to easier availability of the site.

The village of Shiplake has a bed and breakfast establishment called Crowsley House.

In the late 1960s London architects, Hugh and Beeban Morris, found out about the house. While the BBC utilised the grounds the house itself was neglected and in an advanced state of decay, like many disused country homes at that time, large numbers of which became damaged beyond repair and were then demolished. The Morrises subscribed to the Society for the Protection of Ancient Buildings publications and corresponded with the BBC about the house. The BBC agreed to allow the Morrises a 20-year lease free of charge on condition that the house was maintained as the listing required. It became the passion of Hugh Morris who drove out from London every weekend. The roof-lead that had been stolen was restored to prevent further damage to the Georgian section of the house and other essential repairs were carried out. Unfortunately, the Victorian extension was too damaged with dry-rot to enable preservation and was demolished, leaving only sections of its ground floor wall and what became a "gazebo" tower. Hugh also spend his weekend hours in the 7-acre (2.8 ha) wild garden uncovering the range of plants, shrubs and trees typical of the gardens from the late Victorian era. This became the weekend playground for his young family and a haven for socialisation and short breaks which were shared with many friends. New owners purchased the leasehold of the house in the 1990s.
