= Wendy Craig =

British actress (born 1934)

Wendy Craig CBE
- Born: Anne Gwendolyn Craig; 20 June 1934 (age 92); Sacriston, County Durham, England
- Education: Royal Central School of Speech and Drama
- Occupation: Actress
- Years active: 1955–present
- Spouse: Jack Bentley (m. 1955; died 1994)

Wendy Craig (born Anne Gwendolyn Craig; 20 June 1934) is an English actress who is best known for her appearances in the sitcoms Not in Front of the Children (1967–1970), ...And Mother Makes Three (1971–1973), ...And Mother Makes Five (1974–1976) and Butterflies (1978–1983). She played the role of Matron in the TV series The Royal (2003–2011).

Craig was nominated for the BAFTA Award for Most Promising Newcomer to Leading Film Roles for her performance in The Servant (1963) and won the BAFTA Award for Best Actress in 1969 for Not in Front of the Children.

== Early life ==
Anne Gwendolyn Craig was born on 20 June 1934 in Sacriston, County Durham, the daughter of farmer George Craig and his wife Anne (née Lindsay). She attended Durham High School for Girls, initially as a day pupil and later as a boarder, which she revisited in October 2007 to open a new building that had been named after her. She passed the 11+ examination and went to Darlington High School. When she was twelve years old the family moved to Picton, North Yorkshire and she attended nearby Yarm Grammar School. She trained as an actress at the Central School of Speech and Drama, then based in the Royal Albert Hall, London.

In 1956, Craig appeared in the West End alongside Robertson Hare in John Dighton's farce Man Alive!.

== Career ==
One of her early TV appearances was in an episode of the Danger Man series called "The Gallows Tree" (1961). In the 1960s Craig appeared in British films such as The Servant (1963) and The Nanny (1965) with Bette Davis, but it was her appearances in British sitcoms of the late 1960s/1970s which led to her becoming a household name, usually playing a scatty middle class housewife. She went from the BBC's Not in Front of the Children (1967–1970) to ITV's ...And Mother Makes Three (1971–1973), in which she played a single parent, which evolved into its sequel ...And Mother Makes Five (1974–1976). Then came Butterflies (1978–1983), a successful comedy on BBC2.

Craig returned to drama with the series Nanny (1981–1983), a series she created, and wrote some episodes herself as Jonathan Marr, a pseudonym she had used before when writing episodes of ...And Mother Makes Five. Twenty years later, she played Matron in ITV's The Royal (2003–2011) and she also made several appearances in the 2002 adaptation of John Galsworthy's novel The Forsyte Saga. However, she has continued to be associated with comedy, having taken one of the leading roles as Annie in Brighton Belles (1993–1994), the UK's short-lived version of The Golden Girls. She appeared as Reggie's mother in the BBC One comedy Reggie Perrin (2009–2010), an update of the 1970s' series The Fall and Rise of Reginald Perrin.

In 2012, Craig appeared as a guest in an episode of the cookery series MasterChef, along with many other 1970s sitcom stars. In 2014 she appeared in an episode of the BBC drama Waterloo Road.

In 2016, Craig appeared as Mary Goodman in the BBC detective series Death in Paradise. In 2017 she appeared in the second series of the ITV drama Unforgotten. Also in 2017 she starred as Miss Bat in the first three series of the CBBC programme The Worst Witch. In 2018, she appeared in the ITV soap Emmerdale. In October 2019, she appeared in an episode of Doctors alongside former Butterflies co-star Bruce Montague.

== Personal life ==
Craig was married to Jack Bentley, a trombonist, scriptwriter and journalist, from 1955 until his death in 1994. During her marriage with Bentley, she had two sons: Alaster, who was later principal oboist for the Birmingham Royal Ballet Sinfonia and Ross, an IT consultant, as the result of an affair with John Mortimer. In 2004, having heard that the secret was out, Wendy visited Mortimer to reveal formally that their affair had resulted in a son, then 42. She was at the time of the leak appearing in an episode of Midsomer Murders; series star John Nettles later said one of his favourite memories of the series was picking up a copy of The Daily Telegraph on set during that filming with a headline revealing the secret, remarking that "It just seemed so absolutely Midsomer".

Since the 1990s, Craig has lived in Cookham, Berkshire. She was appointed Commander of the Order of the British Empire (CBE) in the 2020 New Year Honours for services to drama and charity.

== Selected filmography ==
- The Secret Place (1957)
- Room at the Top (1959)
- The Mind Benders (1963)
- The Servant (1963)
- The Nanny (1965)
- Just like a Woman (1967)
- I'll Never Forget What's'isname (1967)
- Joseph Andrews (1977)
- Run for Your Wife (2012)
- The Worst Witch (2017–2019)
- Emmerdale (2018)
- Doctors (2019)
