= BBC Monitoring =

British Broadcasting Corporation division

- Abbreviation: BBCM
- Formation: 26 August 1939
- Headquarters: London
- Region served: Global
- Services: Open-source intelligence
- Leader: Liz Howell
- Parent organization: BBC
- Website: monitoring.bbc.co.uk

BBC Monitoring (BBCM) is a division of the British Broadcasting Corporation which monitors, and reports on, mass media worldwide using open-source intelligence. Based at New Broadcasting House, the BBC's headquarters in central London, it has overseas bureaus in Cairo, Delhi, Istanbul, Jerusalem, Kyiv, Miami, Nairobi, Ramallah, Tashkent and Tbilisi.

A signals-receiving station for BBC Monitoring is at Crowsley Park in South Oxfordshire, close to BBCM's former (1943–2018) headquarters at Caversham Park. The service's first home (1939–1943) was at Wood Norton Hall in Worcestershire.

BBC Monitoring selects and translates information from radio, television, the press, news agencies and online outlets from 150 countries in up to 100 languages. Reporting produced by the service is used by the government of the United Kingdom and commercial customers such as Oxford Analytica, the Bureau of Investigative Journalism and Liverpool John Moores University. The BBC announced in July 2017 that it planned to sell the site at Caversham Park and move employees to London, which took place in May 2018.

== History ==
The organisation was formed in 1939 to provide the British Government with access to foreign media and propaganda. It provided the government with valuable information during World War II, particularly in places where foreign journalists were banned. The organisation played an important role in helping observers keep track of developments during the Cold War, the disintegration of the Iron Curtain and collapse of the Soviet Union. Also monitored were the Yugoslav Wars and the Middle East. They also had 7 decades of collaboration with the CIA Foreign Broadcast Information Service.

== Funding ==
Although administratively and editorially part of the BBC, until 2013 BBC Monitoring did not receive any funding from the licence fee; instead it was funded directly by its stakeholders as well as by subscriptions from official and commercial bodies throughout the world. The principal stakeholder is the Cabinet Office and subscriptions were also received from the Foreign and Commonwealth Office, the Ministry of Defence and the BBC World Service. Other customers include other government departments, private sector and voluntary sector organisations.

In the 2010 BBC licence fee settlement, the BBC agreed to take on the government's funding of BBC Monitoring from 2013/2014, finding the £25 million required from the licence fee.

Reported on BBC News (17 January 2011), BBC Monitoring cut 72 posts following a £3 million cut in funding over the next two years. Director of BBC Monitoring, Chris Westcott, said: "Regrettably service cuts and post closures are inevitable given the scale of the cut in funding."

The proposal was to cut £3m from the service's costs by closing the 72 posts – about 16% of its staff – but expected to create 18 new posts. The BBC agreed to finance Monitoring from 2013/14 as part of the 2010 licence fee settlement which froze the annual colour licence fee at £145.50 for six years. The agreement also saw the corporation agree to take over the Foreign Office-funded World Service from 2014.

The House of Commons Foreign Affairs and Defence Committees strongly condemned the gradual scaling down of BBC Monitoring's capabilities in two separate reports published in late 2016. The reports claimed that BBC Monitoring's operations have been adversely affected by cuts. Both Committees demanded proper funding to ensure BBC Monitoring's future.

== Leadership ==
The following have served as Directors of BBC Monitoring since 1996:

- 1996−2003: Andrew Hills
- 2003−2015: Chris Westcott
- 2015−2016: Lucio Mesquita
- 2016−2019: Sara Beck
- 2019−present: Liz Howell
