= List of other television appearances by Morecambe and Wise =

The English comic double act of Eric Morecambe and Ernie Wise made their first appearance on television in 1951. Following this first appearance, they were to star in four separate television series of their own, as well as making many appearances on other television shows. The following is a list of appearances that the pair made, both together and separately, on television, apart from their own four series.

== Background ==
In the late 1940s, the comedy duo of Morecambe and Wise had begun to make a name for themselves on the variety theatre circuit, and had also made some forays onto BBC Radio. At this time, although still in its infancy in the United Kingdom, television was beginning to assume a greater level of importance in entertainment. Morecambe and Wise's first television audition was at the BBC in 1948, which was when they began a firm resolution that they should appear on television as soon as possible. Their first actual television appearance came in 1951, on a half-hour variety short called Parade of Youth. Following this, they were to make a number of appearances prior to being given the opportunity to do their own television series, Running Wild, in 1954. The failure of Running Wild led to the duo subsequently returning to live variety for a period, until they were invited back to television on The Winifred Atwell Show in 1956.

== Full series appearances ==
=== The Winifred Atwell Show ===
Following the failure of Running Wild in 1954, Morecambe and Wise returned to the variety circuit in an effort to restore the fortunes of their act. Having made a successful return to the public eye, after two years they felt ready to make a second attempt at television. Dicky Leeman, a producer with ATV, one of the new independent broadcasters on the ITV network, contacted them with a view to their becoming regulars on a planned new variety show fronted by the pianist Winifred Atwell, with material provided by the writer Johnny Speight. Morecambe and Wise eventually became the resident comedians on the show for the duration of its first series.

No.	Guests	Producer	Written by	Broadcast
1.1	Winifred Atwell, Morecambe and Wise, Jennifer Jayne, Pearl Carr & Teddy Johnson, The George Carden Dancers	Dicky Leeman	Bill Craig	21 April 1956
1.2	Winifred Atwell, Morecambe and Wise, Jennifer Jayne, Pearl Carr & Teddy Johnson, The George Carden Dancers	Dicky Leeman	Bill Craig	28 April 1956
1.3	Winifred Atwell, Morecambe and Wise, Jennifer Jayne, Pearl Carr & Teddy Johnson, The George Carden Dancers	Dicky Leeman	Bill Craig	5 May 1956
1.4	Winifred Atwell, Morecambe and Wise, Jennifer Jayne, Pearl Carr & Teddy Johnson, The George Carden Dancers	Dicky Leeman	Bill Craig	12 May 1956
1.5	Winifred Atwell, Morecambe and Wise, Jennifer Jayne, Pearl Carr & Teddy Johnson, The George Carden Dancers	Dicky Leeman	Bill Craig	19 May 1956
1.6	Winifred Atwell, Morecambe and Wise, Jennifer Jayne, Pearl Carr & Teddy Johnson, The George Carden Dancers	Dicky Leeman	Bill Craig	26 May 1956
1.7	Winifred Atwell, Morecambe and Wise, Jennifer Jayne, Pearl Carr & Teddy Johnson, The George Carden Dancers	Dicky Leeman	Bill Craig	2 June 1956
1.8	Winifred Atwell, Morecambe and Wise, Jennifer Jayne, Pearl Carr & Teddy Johnson, The George Carden Dancers	Dicky Leeman	Bill Craig	9 June 1956
1.9	Winifred Atwell, Morecambe and Wise, Jennifer Jayne, Pearl Carr & Teddy Johnson, The George Carden Dancers	Dicky Leeman	Bill Craig	16 June 1956
1.10	Winifred Atwell, Morecambe and Wise, Jennifer Jayne, Pearl Carr & Teddy Johnson, The George Carden Dancers	Dicky Leeman	Bill Craig	23 June 1956

=== Double Six ===
Morecambe and Wise, having achieved success on The Winifred Atwell Show, felt comfortable enough with television the following year to return to the BBC, where they headlined a new variety show called Double Six.

No.	Guests	Producer	Broadcast
1.1	Morecambe and Wise, Eileen Dyson, John Gower, Ted Lune, The Jack Billings Dancers, The BBC Northern Dance Orchestra	Ronnie Taylor	11 August 1957
1.2	Morecambe and Wise, Eileen Dyson, John Gower, Ted Lune, The Jack Billings Dancers, The BBC Northern Dance Orchestra	Ronnie Taylor	18 August 1957
1.3	Morecambe and Wise, Eileen Dyson, John Gower, Ted Lune, The Jack Billings Dancers, The BBC Northern Dance Orchestra	Ronnie Taylor	25 August 1957
1.4	Morecambe and Wise, Eileen Dyson, John Gower, Ted Lune, The Jack Billings Dancers, The BBC Northern Dance Orchestra	Ronnie Taylor	1 September 1957
1.5	Morecambe and Wise, Eileen Dyson, John Gower, Ted Lune, The Jack Billings Dancers, The BBC Northern Dance Orchestra	Ronnie Taylor	8 September 1957

=== It's Childsplay ===
In 1976, at the height of their success at the BBC, Morecambe and Wise fronted a new children's series called It's Childsplay. Unlike previous series, the duo only played a hosting role in this, as it was a showcase for teenage screenwriters to have their work produced for television with casts of respected actors.

No.	Guests	Directed by	Producer	Broadcast	Note
1.1	Jean Anderson, Alfie Bass, Ralph Bates, Joan Benham, Edward Hardwicke, Jon Laurimore, Gillian Phelps, Rudolph Walker	Brian Penders	Johnny Downes	30 July 1976	
1.2	Arthur Lowe, Suzanne Neve, Hilary Tindall, Michael Bevis, Roger Bizley, Tony Cundell, Bill Pearson	Brian Penders	Johnny Downes	6 August 1976	
1.3	Sinead Cusack, Ian Ogilvy, Jill Townsend, Simon Williams, Darien Angadi, Roger Bizley, Ray Callaghan, Susan Field, Patrick Jordan, George Little, Keith Marsh, Norman Mitchell, Conrad Phillips, Joe Ritchie, Jo Rowbottom, Richard Shaw	Brian Penders	Johnny Downes	13 August 1976	
1.4	Michael Aldridge, Blake Butler, Peter Jones, Penelope Keith, Bert Palmer, Peter Sallis, Zena Walker, Edward Burnham, Jane Cussons, Alison Glennie, Roy Holder, Donald Morley	Brian Penders	Johnny Downes	20 August 1976	
1.5	Christopher Cazenove, Beryl Cooke, Glynn Edwards, Clifford Evans, Carmel McSharry, Richard Morant, Angharad Rees, Helen Shingler, Joshua Le Touzel	Brian Penders	Johnny Downes	27 August 1976	
1.6	Keith Barron, Dora Bryan, Michael Gough, Norma West, David King, Colette O'Neil	Brian Penders	Johnny Downes	3 September 1976	

== Guest appearances ==
=== The Ed Sullivan Show ===
In 1962, with their new television show for ATV, Two of a Kind having completed its second series, Morecambe and Wise were appearing at the London Palladium for a live variety date. In the audience was the American variety host and impresario, Ed Sullivan. Sullivan, a noted fan of British acts, was at the performance to look at the night's host, Bruce Forsyth, but was so impressed with Morecambe and Wise that he offered them the opportunity of three appearances on his variety show on CBS in the United States. Despite lukewarm responses from audiences, Sullivan remained a fan of the duo, and they made a number of appearances on The Ed Sullivan Show between 1963 and 1968. These including appearing on one of the first shows to feature the Beatles, (Note: Two months after the 23 February 1964 edition of The Ed Sullivan Show, The Beatles were the special guests on Morecambe & Wise's own show, Two of a Kind, in the UK.) as well as being invited to take part in a special edition to celebrate the 80th birthday of Irving Berlin.

No.	Guests	Directed by	Producer	Broadcast	Note
16.24	Paul Anka, Sid Caeser, The Chad Mitchell Trio, Judge Pigmeat Markham and Shorty, The Maguire Sisters, Morecambe and Wise, Rico	Robert Bleyer and John Moffitt	Bob Precht	17 March 1963	
16.25	Chubby Checker, Tommy Cooper, Totie Fields, Joy Kaye, Dave Madden, Morecambe and Wise, The Saddri Dancers, The Spencer Trio, Barbra Streisand	Robert Bleyer and John Moffitt	Bob Precht	24 March 1963	
16.41	The Antonio Ballet Espanol, Pat Buttram, Danny Costello, Jackie Mason, Morecambe and Wise, Joya Sherrill, Kate Smith	Robert Bleyer and John Moffitt	Bob Precht	4 August 1963	
17.6	The Augsburg Jungle Wonders, Richard Burton, The Cincos Brutos, Dave Madden, Morecambe and Wise, Arthur Worsley	Robert Bleyer and John Moffitt	Bob Precht	3 November 1963	
17.21	Acker Bilk, The Beatles, Gordon MacRae, Sheila MacRae, Cab Calloway, Dave Barry, Gloria Bleezarde, Morty Gunty, Morecambe and Wise, Pinky and Perky	Tim Kiley, Robert Bleyer and John Moffitt	Bob Precht	23 February 1964	
17.33	Professor Backwards, The Duke Ellington Orchestra, The Lipizzaner Stallions, Liza Minnelli, Morecambe and Wise, Shirley Verrett, Jean-Paul Vignon, The Watusi Dancers	Robert Bleyer and John Moffitt	Bob Precht	24 May 1964	
18.40	Cairoli and Company, Gerry and the Pacemakers, The Kessler Twins, Rich Little, Morecambe and Wise, The Three Hermanis, Jerry Vale, The Womenfolk	Robert Bleyer and John Moffitt	Bob Precht	29 August 1965	
20.18	Norm Crosby, Linon, Julia Meade, Morecambe and Wise, Rasha and Tiby, Sandler and Young, Dionne Warwick	Robert Bleyer and John Moffitt	Bob Precht	7 January 1967	
21.12	John Byner, The Doodletown Pipers, Connie Francis, Al Hirt, Morecambe and Wise, Jane Morgan	Robert Bleyer and John Moffitt	Bob Precht	26 November 1967	
21.22	Sergio Franchi, Peter Gennaro, Gil and Freddie Lavedo, Stu Gilliam, Michele Lee, Morecambe and Wise, Regina Resnik, Stiller and Meara, Jackie Vernon	Robert Bleyer and John Moffitt	Bob Precht	4 February 1968	
21.26	The First Edition, Sergio Franchi, Alan King, Jack E. Leonard, Morecambe and Wise, Lou Rawls, Joan Rivers, Dana Valery	Robert Bleyer and John Moffitt	Bob Precht	3 March 1968	
21.34	Bing Crosby, Fred Waring and his Pennsylvanians, Peter Gennaro, Robert Goulet, Bob Hope, Harry James, Ethel Merman, Morecambe and Wise, Diana Ross and the Supremes	Robert Bleyer and John Moffitt	Bob Precht	5 May 1968	
80th birthday tribute to Irving Berlin

=== Sunday Night at the London Palladium / The London Palladium Show ===
In 1955, prior to their joining the cast of The Winifred Atwell Show, Morecambe and Wise made their first appearance on Val Parnell's variety show for ATV, Sunday Night at the London Palladium. Over the next decade, the duo made a total of eleven appearances on the programme, both before and after they had achieved success with their own ATV television series, Two of a Kind.

No.	Guests	Broadcast	Note
Sunday Night at the London Palladium
1.10	Tommy Trinder (host), Morecambe and Wise, Elizabeth Seal, David Whitfield, Arthur Worsley	27 November 1955	
1.20	Tommy Trinder (host), Morecambe and Wise, Joan Regan, Derek Roy, Ganjou Brothers and Juanita	5 February 1956	
6.7	Don Arrol (host), Morecambe and Wise, Connie Francis, Ugo Garrido, Beryl Grey	23 October 1960	
6.10	Don Arrol (host), Morecambe and Wise, Ravic & Babs	13 November 1960	
6.15	Don Arrol (host), Morecambe and Wise, The Andrews Sisters	1 January 1961	
9.10	Bruce Forsyth (host), Morecambe and Wise, Nina & Frederik	24 November 1963	
300th edition
10.3	Bruce Forsyth (host), Morecambe and Wise, The King Brothers, Millicent Martin, The Wynchwoods	4 October 1964	
10.24	Norman Vaughan (host), Morecambe and Wise, Potassy	21 March 1965	
The London Palladium Show
S.3	Roger Moore (host), Morecambe and Wise, Millicent Martin, Arno and Rita van Bolen	14 August 1966	
2.2	Bob Monkhouse (host), Morecambe and Wise, Millicent Martin, Tom Jones, Kate Smith, Jack Parnell and his Orchestra, The Mike Sammes Singers	2 October 1966	
2.7	Roger Moore (host), Morecambe and Wise, The Bachelors, Joe Brown, Jack Parnell and his Orchestra, The Mike Sammes Singers	27 November 1966	

=== Other appearances ===
==== Morecambe and Wise ====
Series title	Episode number	Transmission date	Channel	Production company
Parade of Youth	1	28 September 1951	BBC Television	BBC
Stars at Blackpool	2	28 August 1953	BBC Television	BBC
Variety Parade	1.1	24 October 1953	BBC Television	BBC
Face the Music	2.5	12 December 1953	BBC Television	BBC
This Is Show Business	7.4	28 November 1956	BBC Television	BBC
Blackpool Show Parade	1.1	3 June 1957	BBC Television	BBC
Stars at Blackpool	5	23 September 1957	BBC Television	BBC
The Good Old Days	6.2	1 May 1958	BBC Television	BBC
Blackpool Show Parade	2.3	3 July 1959	BBC Television	BBC
The Good Old Days	7.4	26 December 1959	BBC Television	BBC
Little Miss Music	1.4	3 March 1960	BBC Television	BBC North
Saturday Spectacular	5.12	9 July 1960	ITV	ATV
The Jo Stafford Show	1.4	4 November 1961	ITV	ATV
Juke Box Jury	1.278	28 November 1964	BBCtv	BBC
Those Two Fellers	1.6	15 June 1967	ITV	ABC Weekend TV
One Pair of Eyes	1.29	7 June 1969	BBC1	BBC
Parkinson	2.20	11 November 1972	BBC1	BBC
Omnibus	6.15	18 February 1973	BBC1	BBC
The Dean Martin Comedy World	1.1	6 June 1974	NBC	Greg Garrison Productions
Looks Familiar		14 September 1976	ITV	Thames Television
Looks Familiar		22 February 1978	ITV	Thames Television
Looks Familiar		19 April 1978	ITV	Thames Television
The Sweeney	4.11	23 November 1978	ITV	Euston Films

==== Eric Morecambe ====
Series title	Episode number	Transmission date	Channel	Production company
Looks Familiar		26 January 1976	ITV	Thames Television
Looks Familiar		1 March 1976	ITV	Thames Television
Everyman	1.4	1 May 1977	BBC1	BBC
World of Sport		24 December 1978	ITV	London Weekend Television
Channel Interview		27 November 1980	ITV	Channel Television
Pebble Mill at One		14 September 1981	BBC1	BBC
Russell Harty		4 November 1982	BBC2	BBC
The Saturday Show	2.30	7 April 1984	ITV	Central Television

==== Ernie Wise ====
Series title	Episode number	Transmission date	Channel	Production company
Looks Familiar		23 September 1975	ITV	Thames Television
Looks Familiar		2 February 1976	ITV	Thames Television
Looks Familiar	13.1	2 August 1984	ITV	Thames Television
Looks Familiar	13.12	18 October 1984	ITV	Thames Television
What's My Line?		24 December 1984	ITV	Thames Television
Look Who's Talking	124	3 January 1985	ITV	Border Television
Too Close for Comfort	5.14	5 October 1985	Syndication	D.L. Taffner Productions
The Lowdown	2.3	18 April 1989	BBC1	BBC
Rainbow	18.9	3 November 1989	ITV	Thames Television
Countdown	19.14	18 January 1990	Channel 4	Yorkshire Television
Countdown	19.15	19 January 1990	Channel 4	Yorkshire Television
Countdown	19.16	22 January 1990	Channel 4	Yorkshire Television
Countdown	19.17	23 January 1990	Channel 4	Yorkshire Television
Countdown	19.18	24 January 1990	Channel 4	Yorkshire Television
Countdown	19.19	25 January 1990	Channel 4	Yorkshire Television
Countdown	20.38	22 August 1990	Channel 4	Yorkshire Television
Countdown	20.39	23 August 1990	Channel 4	Yorkshire Television
Countdown	20.40	24 August 1990	Channel 4	Yorkshire Television
Countdown	20.41	27 August 1990	Channel 4	Yorkshire Television
Countdown	20.42	28 August 1990	Channel 4	Yorkshire Television
Countdown	20.43	29 August 1990	Channel 4	Yorkshire Television
40 Minutes	13.11	27 April 1993	BBC2	BBC

== See also ==
- Running Wild (1954 TV series) § List of episodes (BBC)
- List of Two of a Kind episodes (ATV for ITV)
- List of The Morecambe & Wise Show (1968 TV series) episodes (BBC)
- List of The Morecambe & Wise Show (1978 TV series) episodes (Thames for ITV)
