= The Morecambe & Wise Show =

The Morecambe & Wise Show may refer to multiple television and radio programmes starring the British comedy double act Morecambe and Wise.

- Two of a Kind (British TV series), sometimes titled The Morecambe & Wise Show, their first show for ITV (1961–1968)
- The Morecambe & Wise Show (1968 TV series), the duo's successful television show for the BBC
- The Morecambe & Wise Show (1978 TV series), their second show for ITV, produced by Thames

== Other productions ==
- The Eric Morecambe and Ernie Wise Show (1975–1978), a series on BBC Radio 2
