= Running Wild (1954 TV series) =

Morecambe & Wise comedy show for the BBC

- Genre: Sketch show
- Directed by: Ernest Maxin
- Starring: Eric Morecambe; Ernie Wise
- Country of origin: United Kingdom
- Original language: English
- No. of series: 1
- No. of episodes: 6

Production
- Producer: Bryan Sears
- Running time: 30 minutes
- Production company: BBC

Original release
- Network: BBC Television
- Release: 21 April – 30 June 1954

Related
- Two of a Kind; The Morecambe & Wise Show (1968–1977); The Morecambe & Wise Show (1978–1983)

Running Wild was a comedy sketch show originally broadcast by BBC Television, the first TV series by English comedy double-act Morecambe and Wise. The first attempt by the pair at a television series, it aired for a single series of six episodes in 1954. Running Wild was Morecambe & Wise's first collaboration with Ernest Maxin, who subsequently worked with the duo on their second BBC television show.

== History ==
From the late 1940s onwards, Eric Morecambe and Ernie Wise had been steadily building a reputation for their comedy on the national variety circuit. In September 1951, the duo made their first appearance on television with a guest spot on a BBC show called Parade of Youth, while they began making regular appearances on BBC Radio, first as semi-regular participants on Variety Fanfare, and then with their own show, You're Only Young Once, on the BBC Northern Home Service. The success that they began to achieve through their appearances on radio, combined with guest appearances on television, eventually led to the BBC offering them a television series of their own.

Ronnie Waldman, the head of BBC Light Entertainment, was in the process of attempting to devise an idea of television variety programming, rather than televising stage based variety. As part of this, he sought to sign up acts that could adapt to the demands of working on television, which required a huge amount of material. In 1953, Morecambe & Wise made an appearance on the television show Stars in Blackpool, which led to them meeting Waldman, who started forming plans for the duo to headline their own television series. However, although the duo had performed in Southern England on the variety circuit, their broadcasting career had largely taken place in Northern England, which led BBC producers to suggest that their act might not work with southern audiences. Bryan Sears, who was assigned as the new show's producer, eventually attached a group of six writers to the production, which received the title Running Wild. The series was given an initial run of six episodes, to be broadcast live fortnightly from the BBC Television Theatre in Shepherd's Bush.

== List of episodes ==
No.	Guests	Directed by	Written by	Original release date	Reaction Index
1	Alma Cogan, The Four in a Crowd, Ray Buckingham, Marjorie Holmes, Hermione Harvey, Amanda Barrie	Ernest Maxin	Leonard Fincham, Laurie Wyman, Maurice Rodgers, Alan Bain	21 April 1954	43
2	Alma Cogan, The Four in a Crowd, Ray Buckingham, Marjorie Holmes, Hermione Harvey, Amanda Barrie, Bernard Bresslaw	Ernest Maxin	Leonard Fincham, Laurie Wyman	5 May 1954	47
3	Alma Cogan, The Four in a Crowd, Ray Buckingham, Hermione Harvey, Amanda Barrie	Ernest Maxin	Leonard Fincham, Laurie Wyman, Ronnie Hanbury	19 May 1954	50
4	Alma Cogan, The Four in a Crowd, Ray Buckingham, Hermione Harvey, Amanda Barrie	Ernest Maxin	Denis Gifford, Tony Hawes, Ronnie Hanbury	2 June 1954	53
5	Alma Cogan, The Four in a Crowd, Ray Buckingham, Marjorie Holmes, Hermione Harvey, Amanda Barrie	Ernest Maxin	Denis Gifford, Tony Hawes, Ronnie Hanbury	16 June 1954	43
6	The Four in a Crowd, Ray Buckingham, Marjorie Holmes, Hermione Harvey, Amanda Barrie, Jill Day	Ernest Maxin	Denis Gifford, Tony Hawes, Ronnie Hanbury	30 June 1954	51

== Reception ==
Following the broadcast of the first episode, the reviews were poor, with the most notable coming from Kenneth Baily in the People on Sunday 25 April;

Definition of the Week: TV set: the box in which they buried Morecambe and Wise

— Kenneth Baily, The People, 25 April 1954, p. 8

Such was the impact of that review that Eric Morecambe carried a copy of it with him for the rest of his life. The poor reception that the first show received, combined with only minor improvements in the quality for the second and third episodes, led to Morecambe and Wise suggesting to Ronnie Waldman that the remainder of the series be cancelled. In spite of their reservations, Waldman remained steadfast in his confidence in the duo and the production, and it eventually ran for the full six episodes. The Reaction Index, an indicator of the audience's approval of a television programme, given as a score out of 100, had slowly increased over the course of the series, while the reviews had improved. Nevertheless, the criticism that the duo had personally received meant that their morale and enthusiasm had evaporated by the end of the run.

== Aftermath ==
Following the conclusion of Running Wild, Morecambe and Wise returned to the variety circuit. Unlike with the television show, where they had had little influence over the writing or direction of what appeared on the screen, when they appeared on stage, the duo had full control of their material and routines. Their initial appearances after their television experience were uniformly positive; their first post-television appearance, at the Ardwick Hippodrome in Manchester, which came after a period where they had re-written their act, saw them receive a standing ovation. Their initial success led to further variety bookings and a return to radio. Two years after the failure of Running Wild, Morecambe & Wise were invited to do a series of guest spots on The Winifred Atwell Show on ATV. These were successful enough to lead to guest appearances on other television shows, followed by a six-month tour of Australia in 1958. On their return, with a realisation that live variety was on the wane and television was becoming more popular, they decided to focus on TV work, with a view eventually to having their own series. They would eventually achieve this in 1961 when they were signed to ATV and began work on Two of a Kind.

== Archive status ==
Running Wild was broadcast live, with no telerecording made. Although the ITV3 tribute series Morecambe & Wise Forever displayed an original script from Running Wild which stated that it was to be recorded, there is no evidence of whether this occurred and, if so, that any copy survived.

In 2011, the BBC broadcast Eric and Ernie, a dramatization of the early years of Morecambe and Wise's career written by Victoria Wood. This told the duo's story up to their return to variety following their first television series, and featured recreations of several scenes from Running Wild.
