= Miller Brothers and Lois =

American tap dance team

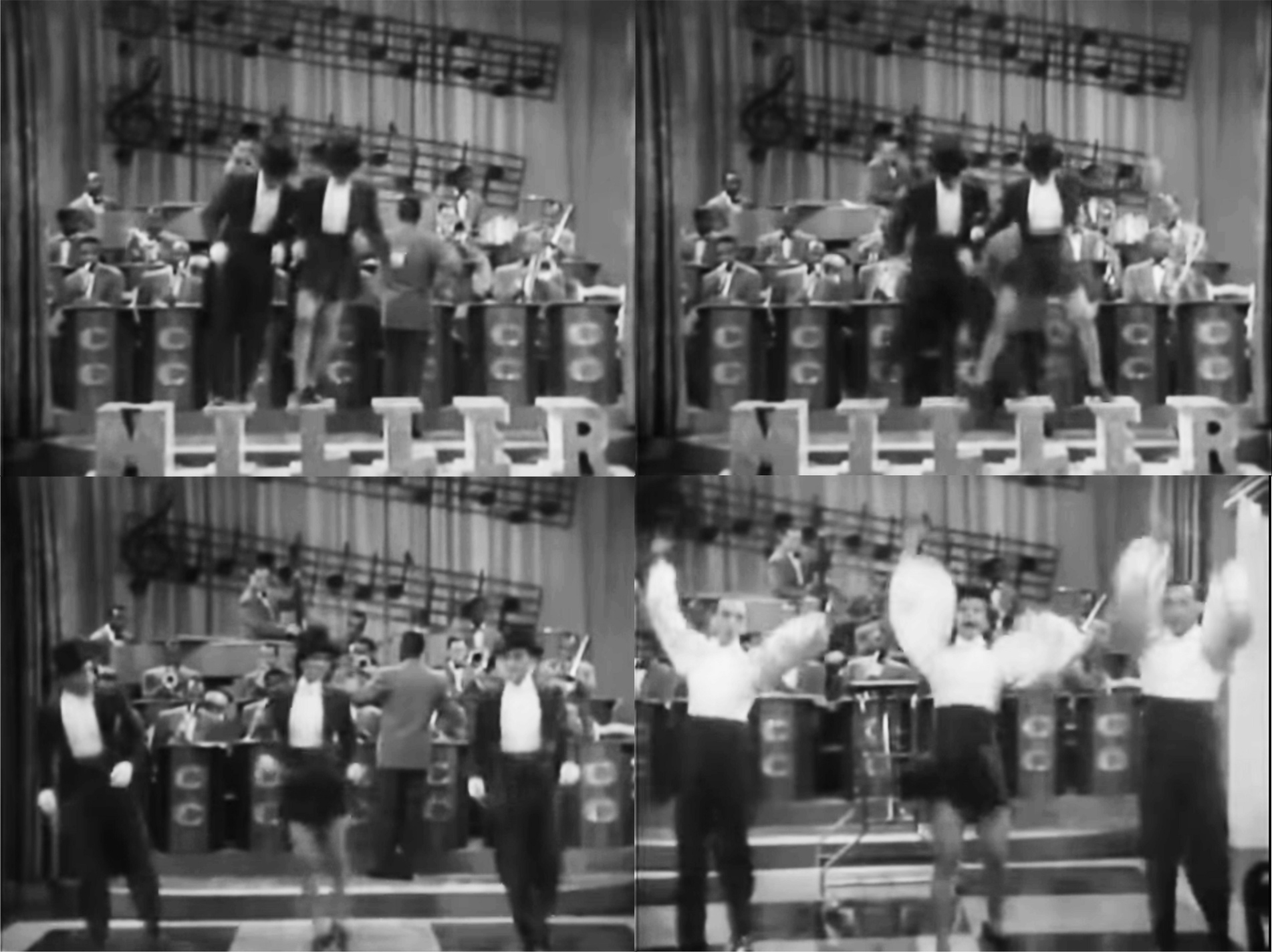
Miller Brothers and Lois tap dance act (50:50 to 56:28) in Hi De Ho

Miller Brothers and Lois, a renowned tap dance class act team, comprising Danny Miller, George Miller and Lois Bright, was a peak of platform dancing with the tall and graceful Lois said to distinguish the trio. The group performed the majority of their act on platforms of various heights, with the initial platform spelling out M-I-L-L-E-R. They performed over-the-tops, barrel turns and wings on six-foot-high pedestals. They toured theatres coast to coast with Jimmy Lunceford and his Orchestra, Cab Calloway and his Orchestra, and the Count Basie Band.

== Early Lives ==
The Miller brothers are from Philadelphia.

Bright was born and raised in Chicago and skilled in rhythm tap, flash, and acrobatics. She is the sister of Ronnell Bright who was the pianist for Sarah Vaughan on a few recordings.

Lois Bright married Danny Miller.

== Career ==
The Miller Brothers were active in various formations from the 1920s through the 1940s. The Miller Brothers had been performing since 1927 and were initially composed of Danny, George and Charles "Honi" Coles. Chick Webb's recording of "Liza" was arranged for the Miller Brothers. Coles made his debut at the Lafayette Theatre in 1931 as one of the Three Millers, a group that performed over-the-tops, barrel turns, and wings on six-foot-high pedestals. In 1932 and 1933 The Miller Brothers comprised three brothers George, Danny and Duke Miller.

Lois Bright was a teen performer with the Whitman Sisters, joining Jeni Le Gon and Catherine Basie as the Snakehip Queens. In 1935 Lois Bright was in the chorus line at Grand Terrace nightclub in Chicago ("The chorus line there was smoking!").

In 1939, when the Miller Brothers were in the market for a new member, it took a lot of convincing from Cholly Atkins before they gave an audition to his friend Lois Bright. Danny Miller doubted a woman could cut it. After Bright proved him wrong, he married her. The premier date for the Miller Brothers and Lois team is unknown but they performed at the Apollo Theater with Jimmie Lunceford on December 27, 1939.

== Film ==
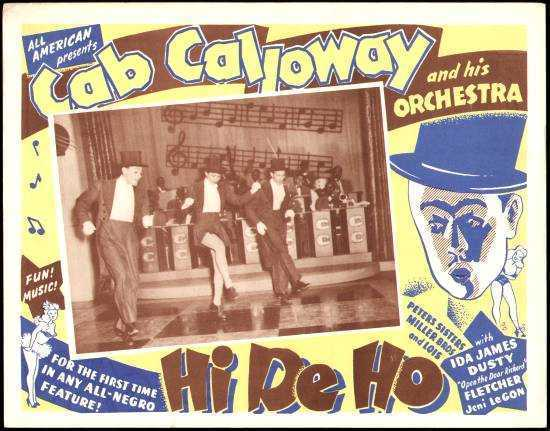
HIDEHO 1947 LC - Miller Brothers

The Miller Brothers and Lois are known to have appeared in one film, Cab Calloway's Hi De Ho from 1947. The first section of their act in the film is prime class-act precision. The two men, in tailcoats and top hats, swivel around Lois, who wears the same getup except for a skirt and Cuban heels. She does what the boys do and throws in high kicks or walkovers as garnish. Across the buttes and valleys of five narrow platforms a few feet high that spell out M-I-L-L-E-R, Lois and one of the guys range sideways and backward, spreading a brisk and daring routine that would be impressive enough on the ground. The final section introduces loftier platforms, one a board almost tall enough to reach Lois's shoulders, and the tempo races even faster. The brothers break out their craziest wings, but the climax comes with Lois, elevated like a woman walking the plank, doing trenches and rotating like a stunt biplane.

Lois Bright appeared in the chorus of Murder in Swingtime (1937).

== Performances and reviews ==
Tap dancer Ludie Jones remembers that Miller Brothers and Lois used to perform spins and jumps off of large drums into splits. Tap dancer Edwina Evelyn commented that while the team of brothers in the act received much attention, Lois Miller "never seemed to get the recognition she deserved for performing the same dance as the men." Honi Coles always confirmed that Miller Brothers and Lois, performing in top hats, white ties and tails, were the epitome of class-act tap dancing. Henry LeTang recalled Miller Brothers and Lois as a "novelty act… who danced on what looked like a big 'T,' maybe 10 feet in the air."

In a February 1934 review of Nana entitled "Anna Sten makes her American film bow in a picture suggested by Emile Zola's 'Nana'" at the Radio City Music Hall, among the stage offerings were the Miller Brothers.

In June 1934, The Miller Brothers were on the Capitol stage program with Duke Ellington and others as part of a stage and screen combination including The Thin Man.

When Miller Brothers and Lois played the Apollo Theater with Jimmie Lunceford on December 27, 1939, they "one-upped the other acts by performing a high-speed rhythm tap dance on a set of four foot high pedestals, each one shaped to spell their name MILLER. They began with rhythm-style soft-shoe, followed by Danny and Lois performing precision tap and acrobatics, then climaxed with the trio dancing on, and quickly across, the pedestals executing wings, barrel turns and trenches." The team wore high-hats and tuxedoes in a high-speed virtuosic dance act that became known for dancing on three-and-four-foot high pedestals.

Variety on May 15, 1940, published a review of the group's performance at the State-Lake Theater in Chicago: "Topping the turns are Miller Bros. and Lois, a dancing trio with some sockeroo acrobatics that make them apart from the general run of hoofing acts. They make a fine appearance in tails and then use elevated platforms for a whirlwind finish. Especially effective is their acrobatic hoofing on a narrow high platform, a circus stunt giving the act both novelty and flash."

In December 1940, Miller Brothers and Lois performed with Jimmie Lunceford's Orchestra at the Metropolitan in Providence as part of a stage and screen combination including Phantom of Chinatown. "

In October 1941, Miller Brothers and Lois performed with Jimmie Lunceford's Orchestra at the Stanley Theatre in Pittsburg as part of a stage and screen combination including Married Bachelor. The second act was that of Miller Brothers and Lois outfitted nattily in white tails and toppers, with the Lois wearing shorts instead of long pants. The Variety reviewer opined that the "threesome goes in for some tricky and at the same time dangerous hoofing, first using horizontal stair platform that doesn't give 'em even a foot to go on. Bang out a set of lightning routines atop a platform on which one misstep would mean a bad fall. Enormously showy turn and over big." ."

In November 1941, Miller Brothers and Lois performed with Jimmie Lunceford's Orchestra at the Keith Boston in Boston as part of a stage and screen combination including Swing It Soldier. "

Miller Brothers and Lois were principals in Harlem Cavalcade assembled and produced by Ed Sullivan at the Ritz Theatre with staging by Noble Sissle which opened May 1, 1942 and closed after 49 performances. The Variety reviewer opined that " the excellent and well-appearing dance trio, Miller Brothers and Lois, pep up the performance next to the finale ensemble."

In August 1942, Miller Brothers and Lois performed with Will Osborne's Orchestra at the RKO Theater in Boston as part of a stage and screen combination including My Favorite Spy. The Variety reviewer opined that the dance team "catch on at their entrance with a top-gear tap routine and follow up with whimisical intricacies on a high rig which spots them nicely."

In February 1943, Miller Brothers and Lois performed with the Jimmie Lunceford Orchestra at the Stanley Theater in Pittsburgh as part of a vaudeville movie bill including Andy Hardy's Double Life. The Variety reviewer opined that the dance team "doesn't rate more than just fair."

In September 1943, Jimmie Lunceford and his Orchestra headlined the vaudeville presentation at Loew's State Theatre which included Miller Brothers and Lois.

Curtain Time: The Revue, a vaudeville style show presented by Fred Finkelhoffe and Paul Small opened December 23, 1943 at the Curran Theatre in San Francisco for a six-week run starring Chico Marx and Connie Boswell with Miller Brothers and Lois appearing in Act I. The Variety reviewer opined that the Miller Brothers and Lois opening act was "dazzlingly fast" setting the "tempo for the entire show."

Miller Brothers and Lois were in the 1945 USO production of Noble Sissle, Shuffle Along Overseas, streamlined from Sissle's 1921 Broadway black musical Shuffle Along.

In December 1946, Miller Brothers and Lois performed with the Cab Calloway Orchestra at the Chicago Theater in Chicago as part of a vaudeville movie bill including The Cockeyed Miracle. The Variety reviewer noted that they did some "nifty tapstering on raised platforms ending with tap turn six feet in the air. Off to nice returns."

In April 1947 Cab Calloway and his Orchestra were on stage at the Strand Theatre, where the Miller Brothers and Lois were part of the stage show.

When the act was dissolved, the Pittsburgh Courier (21 August 1948) wrote that the team "gave up the profession for a safe life," referencing the tremendous physical risk taken each time for performing the routine, and the perilous risks of continuing a career in show business.

== Teaching ==
In 1962, Lois Miller, divorced for some years from Danny Miller, opened the Lois Miller School of dancing in Harlem.
