= Peters Sisters =

American vocal trio

The Peters Sisters
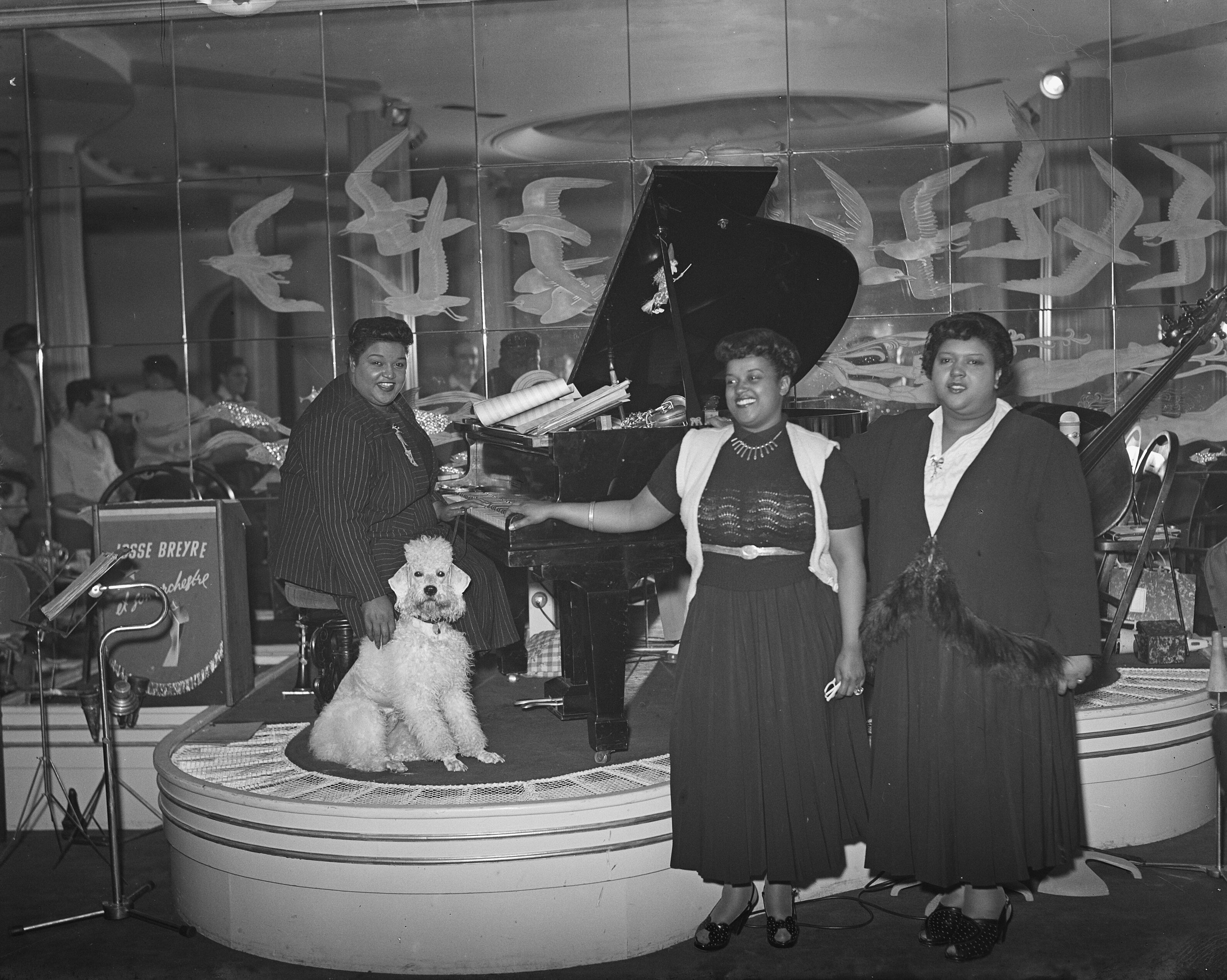
- In Noordwijk, The Netherlands, 1950

Background information
- Genres: Traditional pop
- Years active: 1935–1963
- Past members: Mattie Peters; Anne Peters; Virginia Peters

The Peters Sisters were an American vocal trio who performed between the 1930s and 1960s, mainly in Europe, and appeared in films. They were Mattie Jane Peters (August 9, 1917 – July 31, 1983), Anna Louise Peters (November 24, 1920 – December 25, 1965), and Virginia Peters (December 28, 1923 – June 9, 2010). After the trio stopped performing in about 1963, Virginia continued as a solo singer and entertainer in France, Virginia Vee.

== Early lives ==
The three sisters were born in Santa Monica, California, and attended Santa Monica High School. Their father was a librarian and ragtime pianist. They had two younger sisters, Edith (1926–2000) and Joyce (b.1929), who also became entertainers.

== Career as trio ==
Mattie (alternatively Matty or Mattye), Anna (or Anne) and Virginia started singing together at local functions and at church. Described as "rotund and delightfully upbeat", the trio were African-Americans, and sang in the style of the Andrews Sisters. In 1935, they sang and danced at the Cafe Trocadero in Hollywood, and were heard by comedian Eddie Cantor, who introduced them to Darryl Zanuck and signed them up to appear in films. They featured in With Love and Kisses (1936), Ali Baba Goes to Town and Love and Hisses (both 1937), and performed in nightclubs, most notably at the Cotton Club in New York City, with Duke Ellington and his orchestra.

The trio came to England in 1938, performed at the London Palladium, and toured Britain in a revue, Hawaiian Paradise, with Max Wall and Ted Ray. They returned to the United States during the Second World War, performed widely at military bases in the U.S., and in the 1945 Cavalcade of Jazz at Wrigley Field in Los Angeles, and appeared in the 1947 Cab Calloway film Hi-De-Ho.

They then returned to Europe, and settled in Paris where they featured in entertainments promoted by Jérôme Médrano in 1947. They appeared in the film Nous irons à Paris (1950), and performed at the Folies Bergère where they had a residency in shows in which – each weighing some 20 stone (130 kg) – they appeared to descend by parachute onto the stage. They toured Europe, the U.S. and South America, and became especially popular in France, Germany, Italy and other parts of Europe, appearing in other films including Attanasio cavallo vanesio (1952), Café chantant (1953), and Die Beine von Dolores (1957). They recorded principally in France, with arranger Billy Moore, releasing several EPs, and the LPs An Evening with the Peters Sisters (1956) and The Swingin' Peters Sisters (1959). They had a successful residency at the Paris Olympia in 1958.

They also performed at the London Palladium in 1959, with Max Bygraves, and appeared with Morecambe and Wise in an episode of their BBC TV series Two of a Kind. In Britain, they recorded the LP The Terrific Peters Sisters in 1961 with Geoff Love and his orchestra.

== Later lives and deaths ==
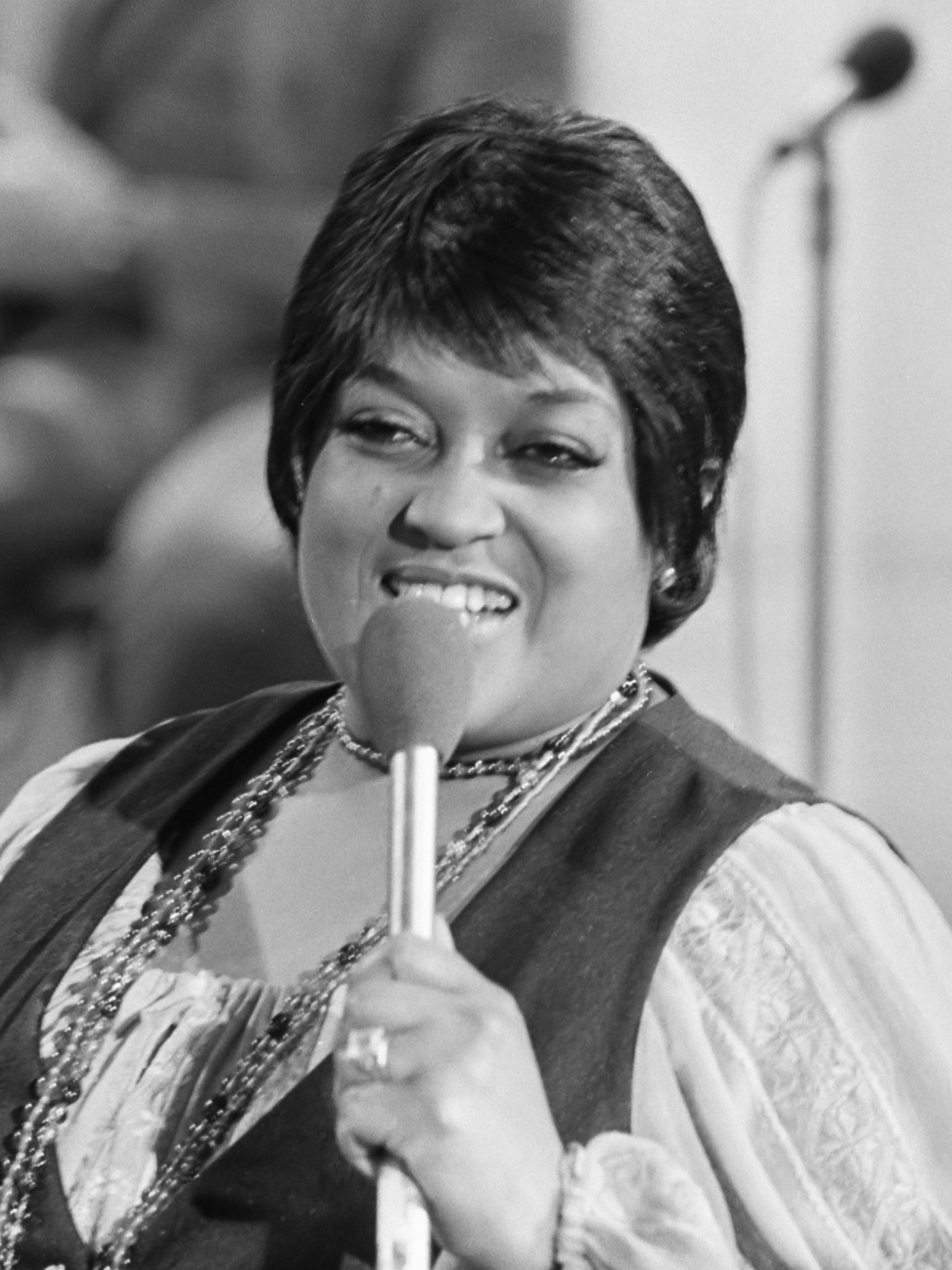
Virginia Vee, 1975

Anna Peters married businessman Kaspar Katz. She died in Paris in 1965, at the age of 45, bringing the trio act to an end.

Mattie Peters married Danish publisher and restaurateur Herman Wolsgaard-Iversen. She lived in Copenhagen, where she continued to perform as a solo entertainer, on stage, radio, and television. She died in 1983, at the age of 65.

Virginia Peters lived in Paris, married designer Michel Engel, and took part in Gilbert Bécaud's project, Opéra d'Aran, in 1962. She later performed as a solo singer under the name Virginia Vee, and released a series of singles and EPs in France, the most successful of which was a version of the Bee Gees' song "I Can't See Nobody" in 1969. Her albums included Jesus Libération (1975) and the live album An American In Warsaw (1989). She appeared frequently on French radio and television, often appearing on variety shows with Guy Lux. She died in Paris in 2010, at the age of 86.
