= Let's Have a Party (disambiguation) =

"Let's Have a Party" is a song whose best-known version was released by Wanda Jackson in 1958.

It may also refer to:

- "Let's Have a Party" (rag), a 1953 ragtime medley by Winifred Atwell
- Let's Have a Party (Rivieras album), 1964
- Let's Have a Party (1982 Wanda Jackson album), 1982
- Let's Have a Party (1995 Wanda Jackson album), 1995
