= Let's Have Another Party =

1954 single by Winifred Atwell

Single by Winifred Atwell
- B-side: "Let's Have Another Party (Part 2)"
- Released: 1954
- Genre: Ragtime; music hall
- Length: 2:48 (Part 1)
- Label: Philips
- Producer: Johnny Franz

"Let's Have Another Party" is a 1954 ragtime medley which became a number one hit in the UK Singles Chart for the pianist Winifred Atwell. It is a composite of several pieces of music, and was a follow-up to Atwell's successful hit "Let's Have a Party" of the previous year.

The songs were written by Nat D. Ayer, Clifford Grey, James W. Tate, Ray Henderson, Mort Dixon and others. It was produced by Johnny Franz and first entered the UK chart on 26 November 1954 for an eight-week run, spending five of those weeks at number one. The medley included parts of the following tunes:

- "Another Little Drink Wouldn't Do Us Any Harm"
- "Broken Doll"
- "Bye Bye Blackbird"
- "Honeysuckle and the Bee"
- "I Wonder Where My Baby is Tonight"
- "Lily of Laguna"
- "Nellie Dean"
- "The Sheik of Araby"
- "Somebody Stole My Gal"
- "When the Red, Red Robin (Comes Bob, Bob, Bobbin' Along)"

With this song, Atwell had the first piano instrumental to reach number one in the UK Singles Chart and was the first black artist to have a number-one hit in the UK Singles Chart, and as of 2023, remains the only female instrumentalist to do so.

Tom Ewing of Freaky Trigger describes "Let's Have Another Party" as a megamix of music hall hits which Atwell instrumentalises, mashes together and plays sped-up on the piano. He noted that the second part of the track on the B-side contains a momentary, arbitrary guitar overdub that plays for a few notes halfway through, calling this an early instance of British pop incorporating a new noise for its own sake.
