= List of Two of a Kind episodes =

Morecambe and Wise TV series, 1961–1968

This is an episode summary of British TV comedy show Two of a Kind, starring Morecambe and Wise.

The show ran for a total of six series on the ITV network between 1961 and 1968, although only Series 2-6 were broadcast under the title Two of a Kind; Series 1 was transmitted under the title Sir Bernard Delfont Presents Morecambe & Wise. Series 6 was recorded for transmission both by ITV and by ABC in the United States. This was extended from 30 to 60 minutes and, for the US transmission, was given the title The Piccadilly Palace. (Note: Morecambe and Wise appeared in a total of eleven out of 14 episodes broadcast of The Piccadilly Palace; other episodes not featuring Morecambe and Wise are not listed.)

== Overview ==
Series	Episodes	Originally released	
Series	Episodes	First released	Last released
1	9	12 October 1961	7 December 1961
2	13	30 June 1962	22 September 1962
3	13	15 June 1963	7 September 1963
4	13	4 April 1964	27 June 1964
5	9	27 January 1966	19 March 1966
6	11	1 October 1967	1 October 1968

== Series One (October–December 1961) ==
Broadcast under the title Sir Bernard Delfont Presents Morecambe & Wise. All episodes missing.

No. overall	No. in series	Guests	Directed by	Written by	Original release date
1	1	None	Colin Clews	Dick Hills & Sid Green	12 October 1961
2	2	The Confederates	Colin Clews	Dick Hills & Sid Green	19 October 1961
3	3	Acker Bilk, The Barney Galbraith Singers	Colin Clews	Dick Hills & Sid Green	26 October 1961
4	4	The McGuire Sisters, Dick Charlesworth and his City Gents	Colin Clews	Dick Hills & Sid Green	2 November 1961
5	5	The Peters Sisters, Kenny Ball and his Jazzmen	Colin Clews	Dick Hills & Sid Green	9 November 1961
6	6	Cleo Laine, The Clyde Valley Stompers	Colin Clews	Dick Hills & Sid Green	16 November 1961
7	7	Gary Miller, Monty Sunshine's Jazz Band	Colin Clews	Dick Hills & Sid Green	23 November 1961
8	8	Valerie Masters, Micky Ashman's Ragtime Jazz Band	Colin Clews	Dick Hills & Sid Green	30 November 1961
9	9	The Kaye Sisters, Alex Welsh and his Band	Colin Clews	Dick Hills & Sid Green	7 December 1961

== Series Two (June–September 1962) ==
First series broadcast under the Two of a Kind title. All episodes extant.

No. overall	No. in series	Guests	Directed by	Written by	Original release date	Prod. code
10	1	The Kaye Sisters, Terry Lightfoot's Jazzmen	Colin Clews	Dick Hills & Sid Green	30 June 1962	2.1
11	2	The Beverley Sisters, Kenny Ball's Jazzmen	Colin Clews	Dick Hills & Sid Green	7 July 1962	2.2
12	3	The Beverley Sisters, Alex Welsh	Colin Clews	Dick Hills & Sid Green	14 July 1962	2.3
13	4	The Beverley Sisters, Acker Bilk	Colin Clews	Dick Hills & Sid Green	21 July 1962	2.4
14	5	Susan Maughan, Mike Cotton Jazzmen	Colin Clews	Dick Hills & Sid Green	28 July 1962	2.5
15	6	The Beverley Sisters, Chris Barber's Jazz Band, Ottile Patterson	Colin Clews	Dick Hills & Sid Green	4 August 1962	2.6
16	7	The Beverley Sisters, Clyde Valley Stompers	Colin Clews	Dick Hills & Sid Green	11 August 1962	2.7
17	8	Teddy Johnson, Pearl Carr, Eric Delaney	Colin Clews	Dick Hills & Sid Green	18 August 1962	2.8
18	9	Teddy Johnson, Pearl Carr, George Chisholm's Jazz Gang	Colin Clews	Dick Hills & Sid Green	25 August 1962	2.10
19	10	Lita Roza, Humphrey Lyttleton	Colin Clews	Dick Hills & Sid Green	1 September 1962	2.11
20	11	Jane Marsden, Alex Welsh	Colin Clews	Dick Hills & Sid Green	8 September 1962	2.12
21	12	Teddy Johnson, Pearl Carr, Mike Cotton Jazzmen	Colin Clews	Dick Hills & Sid Green	15 September 1962	2.13
22	13	Teddy Johnson, Pearl Carr, Jack Parnell	Colin Clews	Dick Hills & Sid Green	22 September 1962	2.9

== Series Three (June–September 1963) ==
All episodes extant.

No. overall	No. in series	Guests	Directed by	Written by	Original release date
23	1	Joe Brown, Michael Sammes Singers and Orchestra, Sheree Winton	Colin Clews	Dick Hills & Sid Green	15 June 1963
24	2	Acker Bilk, The Michael Sammes Singers	Colin Clews	Dick Hills & Sid Green	22 June 1963
25	3	The King Brothers, Barbara Law, Murray Cash	Colin Clews	Dick Hills & Sid Green	29 June 1963
26	4	Sheila Buxton, Michael Sammes Singers and Orchestra, Gillian Cobbold	Colin Clews	Dick Hills & Sid Green	6 July 1963
27	5	The King Brothers, Janie Marden, Norman Mitchell	Colin Clews	Dick Hills & Sid Green	13 July 1963
28	6	The King Brothers, Susan Maughan	Colin Clews	Dick Hills & Sid Green	20 July 1963
29	7	The King Brothers, Sheila Southern	Colin Clews	Dick Hills & Sid Green	27 July 1963
30	8	Roy Castle	Colin Clews	Dick Hills & Sid Green	3 August 1963
31	9	Shani Wallace, Michael Sammes Singers and Orchestra, Jill Curzon	Colin Clews	Dick Hills & Sid Green	10 August 1963
32	10	The King Brothers, Maureen Evans	Colin Clews	Dick Hills & Sid Green	17 August 1963
33	11	The King Brothers, Kathy Kirby, Jill Browne	Colin Clews	Dick Hills & Sid Green	24 August 1963
34	12	Eric Delany's Band, Michael Sammes Singers and Orchestra, Lucille Gaye	Colin Clews	Dick Hills & Sid Green	31 August 1963
35	13	The King Brothers, Rosemary Squires, Gillian Cobbold	Colin Clews	Dick Hills & Sid Green	7 September 1963

== Series Four (April–June 1964) ==
Episode length increased to 35 minutes. All episodes extant.

No. overall	No. in series	Guests	Directed by	Written by	Original release date
36	1	Eddie Calvert and the C Men, The Raindrops	Colin Clews	Dick Hills & Sid Green	4 April 1964
37	2	Kenny Ball and his Jazzmen, Janie Marden	Colin Clews	Dick Hills & Sid Green	11 April 1964
38	3	The Beatles	Colin Clews	Dick Hills & Sid Green	18 April 1964
39	4	Chris Wrayburn, The Viscounts, Janet Webb	Colin Clews	Dick Hills & Sid Green	25 April 1964
40	5	Acker Bilk, Jackie Trent, Penny Morrell	Colin Clews	Dick Hills & Sid Green	2 May 1964
41	6	Patsy Ann Noble	Colin Clews	Dick Hills & Sid Green	9 May 1964
42	7	Edmund Hockridge, Sheila Buxton	Colin Clews	Dick Hills & Sid Green	16 May 1964
43	8	Kathy Kirby, The King Brothers, Freddie Powell	Colin Clews	Dick Hills & Sid Green	23 May 1964
44	9	Joe Brown and the Bruvvers, Joy Marshall	Colin Clews	Dick Hills & Sid Green	30 May 1964
45	10	Dickie Valentine, The Four Macs, Jo Williamson, Judy Mant, Janet Webb, Derek Martin, Johnny Crawford, Robert Jewell	Colin Clews	Dick Hills & Sid Green	6 June 1964
46	11	The Bachelors, Valerie Masters, Gladys Whitred, Alan Curtis, Jo Williamson	Colin Clews	Dick Hills & Sid Green	13 June 1964
47	12	Ray Ellington, Barbara Law, Penny Morrell	Colin Clews	Dick Hills & Sid Green	20 June 1964
48	13	Susan Maughan, Migil Five, Sandra Boize, Jo Williamson, Sally Douglas, Thelma Taylor, Valerie Van Ost, Christina Wass, Julie Devonshire	Colin Clews	Dick Hills & Sid Green	27 June 1964

== Series Five (January–March 1966) ==
All episodes extant. From this series the opening credits billed the show as "The Morecambe & Wise Show".

No. overall	No. in series	Guests	Directed by	Written by	Original release date
49	1	Lulu, Barry Ryan, Paul Ryan, Jan Williams, Wanda Ventham	Colin Clews	Dick Hills & Sid Green	27 January 1966
50	2	The Morgan James Duo, Susan Maughan	Colin Clews	Dick Hills & Sid Green	29 January 1966
51	3	Jackie Trent, The New Faces, Ann Hamilton	Colin Clews	Dick Hills & Sid Green	5 February 1966
52	4	Millicent Martin, The Fortunes	Colin Clews	Dick Hills & Sid Green	12 February 1966
53	5	Georgie Fame, Julie Rogers	Colin Clews	Dick Hills & Sid Green	19 February 1966
54	6	The Settlers, Barbara Law, Wanda Ventham, Christian Pockett	Colin Clews	Dick Hills & Sid Green	26 February 1966
55	7	The King Brothers, Margaret Bass, Toni Eden	Colin Clews	Dick Hills & Sid Green	5 March 1966
56	8	The Shadows, Janie Marden	Colin Clews	Dick Hills & Sid Green	12 March 1966
57	9	Herman's Hermits, Teddy Johnson, Pearl Carr	Colin Clews	Dick Hills & Sid Green	19 March 1966

== Series Six (October 1967–October 1968) ==
Episode length increased to 60 minutes and recorded in colour. Millicent Martin features as regular guest. Broadcast from May–August 1967 as The Piccadilly Palace in the United States; first ten episodes broadcast October 1967–March 1968 on ITV; final episode broadcast October 1968. UK episodes 1 and 2 exist as B&Wtelerecordings, while episodes 3 to 11 are missing.

No. overall	No. in series	Guests	Directed by	Written by	Original release date	US airdate
58	1	Millicent Martin, Freddie and the Dreamers, Jimmie Rodgers	Philip Casson	Dick Hills & Sid Green	1 October 1967	17 June 1967
59	2	Millicent Martin, The Small Faces, Bobby Rydell	Philip Casson	Dick Hills & Sid Green	22 October 1967	3 June 1967
60	3	Millicent Martin, The Hollies, Tom Jones	Philip Casson	Dick Hills & Sid Green	12 November 1967	27 May 1967
61	4	Millicent Martin, Manfred Mann, George Maharis	Philip Casson	Dick Hills & Sid Green	10 December 1967	1 July 1967
62	5	Millicent Martin, The New Vaudeville Band, Frankie Avalon	Philip Casson	Dick Hills & Sid Green	31 December 1967	15 June 1967
63	6	Millicent Martin, The Moody Blues, Tommy Leonetti	Philip Casson	Dick Hills & Sid Green	14 January 1968	22 July 1967
64	7	Millicent Martin, The Tremeloes, Peter Nero	Philip Casson	Dick Hills & Sid Green	4 February 1968	12 August 1967
65	8	Millicent Martin, Eric Burdon and The Animals, Gene Pitney	Philip Casson	Dick Hills & Sid Green	25 February 1968	5 August 1967
66	9	Millicent Martin, Georgie Fame, Bobby Vinton	Philip Casson	Dick Hills & Sid Green	17 March 1968	24 June 1967
67	10	Millicent Martin, the Dave Clark Five, Cliff Richard	Philip Casson	Dick Hills & Sid Green	31 March 1968	20 May 1967
68	11	Millicent Martin, The Kinks, Engelbert Humperdinck	Philip Casson	Dick Hills & Sid Green	1 October 1968	29 July 1967

A further four episodes of The Piccadilly Palace were made, hosted by Millicent Martin, but none of these featured Morecambe and Wise.

== Home media ==
In 1995, ITC released a total of six hour-long VHS "Best of" collections of Two of a Kind. In 2011, Network released what they advertised as the "first" series of Two of a Kind on DVD - this is in fact Series 2, which was the first broadcast under the title. This was subsequently to be followed by Series 3, although this never received a release. In 2016, the company released "The Complete Series", containing all episodes from Series 2-5, plus the two surviving editions of Series 6. In 2021, Network announced plans to re-release all of the remaining episodes of Two of a Kind in a single box set with all episodes of Morecambe & Wise's 1978-1983 series for Thames Television, to be titled as Morecambe & Wise at ITV.

Disc Title	Discs	Year	Episode Count	Release dates	
Disc Title	Discs	Year	Episode Count	Region 2	Region 4
Morecambe & Wise - Two of a Kind: The Complete First Series	2	1962	13	10 October 2011	
Morecambe And Wise - Two Of A Kind: The Complete Series	8	1962-1967	50	5 December 2016	
Morecambe & Wise At ITV	14	1961-1968; 1978-1983	81	29 November 2021	
