= Richard Waring (writer) =

British television scriptwriter (1925–1994)

Richard Waring (born Brian Barton-Chapple, 26 June 1925 – 5 December 1994) was a British television scriptwriter.

Waring was the author of numerous domestic sitcoms from the early 1960s, he worked for both the BBC and ITV. His first success was Marriage Lines (1963–66) with Richard Briers and Prunella Scales. In Not in Front of the Children (1967–70), Wendy Craig's dizzy housewife made her first appearance. Waring created ...And Mother Makes Three (1971–73), and its sequel ...And Mother Makes Five (1974–76), also featuring Craig in a similar role, but he did not write all of the episodes. Other series written by Waring include My Wife Next Door (created by Brian Clemens, 1972), Miss Jones and Son (1977–78) and Rings on Their Fingers (1978–80).

In 1957, Waring married Hermione Harvey, with whom he had two sons. He later married Virginia Brooke-White. His brother was the actor Derek Waring.
