= Ali Baba Goes to Town =

1937 film by David Butler

- Lobby card
- Directed by: David Butler
- Written by: C. Graham Baker; Gene Fowler; Gene Towne; Harry Tugend; Jack Yellen
- Produced by: Darryl F. Zanuck; David Hempstead
- Starring: Eddie Cantor; Tony Martin; Roland Young
- Cinematography: Ernest Palmer
- Edited by: Irene Morra
- Music by: Robert Russell Bennett
- Production company: 20th Century Fox
- Distributed by: 20th Century Fox
- Release date: October 29, 1937
- Running time: 80 minutes
- Country: United States
- Language: English

Ali Baba Goes to Town is a 1937 American musical comedy film directed by David Butler and starring Eddie Cantor, Tony Martin, and Roland Young. Cantor plays a hobo named Aloysius "Al" Babson, who walks into the camp of a movie company that is making the Arabian Nights. He falls asleep and dreams he is in Baghdad as an advisor to the Sultan (Young). He organizes work programs, taxes the rich, and abolishes the army, in a spoof of Roosevelt's New Deal. This film was the second of three in which Shirley Temple and Cesar Romero appeared together, second was Wee Willie Winkie (1937) and The Little Princess (1939).

The cast also includes Gypsy Rose Lee, using the stage name of Louise Hovick, as the Sultana. The Raymond Scott Quintette also appears, performing "Twilight In Turkey."

== Plot ==
A movie company is doing the Arabian Nights when a hobo enters their camp, falls asleep and dreams he's back in Baghdad as advisor to the Sultan. In a spoof of Rosevelt's New Deal, he organizes work programs, taxes the rich and abolishes the army.

== Cast ==
- Eddie Cantor as Ali Baba/Aloysius 'Al' Babson
- Tony Martin as Yusuf/Announcer at Premiere
- Roland Young as Sultan
- June Lang as Princess Miriam
- Gypsy Rose Lee as Sultana
- Raymond Scott as Orchestra Leader
- John Carradine as Ishak/Broderick
- Virginia Field as Dinah
- Alan Dinehart as Boland
- Douglass Dumbrille as Prince Musah
- Maurice Cass as Omar, The Rug Maker
- Warren Hymer as Tramp
- Stanley Fields as Tramp
- Paul Hurst as Captain
- Sam Hayes as Radio Announcer/Assistant Director
- Sidney Fields as Assistant Director
- Ferdinand Gottschalk as Chief Councilor
- Charles Lane as Doctor
- Jeni Le Gon as Specialty Dancer
- The Peters Sisters as Specialty Act
- The Pearl Twins as Specialty Dancers

Uncredited Guests At Premiere:

- Phyllis Brooks as Herself
- Dolores del Río as Herself
- Douglas Fairbanks as Himself
- Jack Haley as Himself
- Sonja Henie as Herself
- Victor McLaglen as Himself
- Tyrone Power as Himself
- The Ritz Brothers as Themselves
- Cesar Romero as Himself
- Ann Sothern as Herself
- Shirley Temple as Herself

== Production ==
Two men were killed and two injured on August 27, 1937, when the flying carpet rig collapsed in the studio. The "carpet" was a 1,500-pound (680 kg) platform suspended high above the floor by piano wires attached to the four corners. The platform fell while it was being tested; none of the actors were on set. Three workmen had been riding on the carpet, with one, camera grip Harry Harsha, dying from his injuries the next day, and 48-year-old actor and prop man Philo Goodfriend was crushed to death underneath. Goodfriend had also been the commodore of Santa Monica Yacht Club.

== Cultural references ==
A clip from Ali Baba Goes to Town is shown in the film The Day of the Locust (1975), in which Karen Black plays an aspiring actress in 1930s Hollywood. A brief shot of Black is edited into the Ali Baba footage to create the impression that her character played a bit role in that film.

Some scenes from Ali Baba Goes to Town are described in detail in Swing Time by Zadie Smith. The character Tracey resembles the dancer Jeni LeGon, who performs in the film.

== See also ==
- List of American films of 1937
