= My Wife Next Door =

1972 British TV sitcom

- Genre: British sitcom
- Created by: Brian Clemens; Richard Waring
- Written by: Richard Waring
- Directed by: Graeme Muir
- Starring: John Alderton; Hannah Gordon
- Composer: Dennis Wilson
- Country of origin: United Kingdom
- Original language: English
- No. of series: 1
- No. of episodes: 13

Production
- Producer: Graeme Muir
- Production company: BBC

Original release
- Network: BBC1
- Release: 19 September – 12 December 1972

My Wife Next Door is a British sitcom created by Brian Clemens and Richard Waring, and written by Waring. It was shown on BBC1 in 1972, and ran for 13 episodes.

The programme is about a couple, George Basset (John Alderton) and Suzie Basset (Hannah Gordon). Each tries to start afresh after their divorce. They move to the country, only to find that they have moved into adjoining cottages.

The series won a British Academy Television Award for Best Situation Comedy in 1973. During a repeat run of the series, in January 1980, one episode gained 19.3 million viewers and was the second most-watched programme that week.

In the 1980s, a three-episode VHS video was released. The complete series was released onto DVD in 2018.

== Episodes ==
All episodes were written by Richard Waring, and directed by Graeme Muir.

Ep. #	Title	Original air date
1	The Nearness of You	19 September 1972
2	What Are Friends For?	26 September 1972
3	Anniversary Schmaltz	3 October 1972
4	For Richer, for Poorer…	10 October 1972
5	Dream Girl	17 October 1972
6	The Absolute End	24 October 1972
7	Total Separation	31 October 1972
8	Undesirable Residence	7 November 1972
9	Pregnant Moment	14 November 1972
10	Second Time Around	21 November 1972
11	A Sense of Movement	28 November 1972
12	Keep Right on to the End	5 December 1972
13	Joint Assignment	12 December 1972
