= Billy Moore (musician, born 1917) =

American jazz musician

William Moore Jr. (December 7, 1917, Parkersburg, West Virginia — February 28, 1989, Copenhagen) was an American jazz pianist and arranger.

Moore was chiefly known as an arranger for most of his jazz career, writing charts for Jimmie Lunceford, Charlie Barnet, Jan Savitt, and Tommy Dorsey in the 1940s. He also worked for publishing companies in New York City. In the 1950s, he relocated to France, where he accompanied and wrote for The Peters Sisters from 1953 to 1960. From 1960 to 1963, he worked as an arranger for Berliner Rundfunk and then accompanied the Delta Rhythm Boys on tour. He moved to Copenhagen in the 1970s, where he remained active as an arranger.

Moore and Leonard Feather were friends, and Feather sometimes used Moore's name for songwriting credits.
