= Hermione Harvey =

English actress and dancer

- Born: Hermione Helen Mary Hudson; 25 June 1931; Mussoorie, India
- Died: 25 September 2016 (aged 85)
- Occupations: Actress, dancer
- Spouses: Richard Waring (m. 1957; div. 1966) John Bradwell (m. 1967; died 1987) Miguel Sintes (m. 2003)
- Children: 2

Hermione Harvey (born Hermione Helen Mary Hudson; 25 June 1931 – 25 September 2016), was an English actress and dancer. She was known in the 1950s for starring on the West End stage in London.

== Early life ==
Harvey was born Hermione Helen Mary Hudson to British parents in Mussoorie, India, on 25 June 1931. She was the child of Charles Hudson, a lieutenant colonel of the Black Watch regiment, and his wife, Helen. After her father's death, her mother married Eric Beauchamp Northcliffe Harmsworth.

== Career ==
At age 15, Harvey made her first appearance on the West End stage in 1946 for a production of The Wizard of Oz. She then joined the Metropolitan Ballet, and soon began a film career.

During her career, she starred with Peter Sellers, Morecambe and Wise, Frankie Howerd, Diana Dors, Donald Sinden, Anna Neagle, Marcia Ashton and many others.

In 1950, Harvey performed at the Theatre Royal, Drury Lane, as the June Girl in the British production of the Rodgers and Hammerstein musical, Carousel. Afterwards, she sailed with the ballet company of Sadler's Wells for a 70-city tour of Canada and the United States.

On 7 June 1953, Harvey starred with British ballet dancer Peter Darrell as a duo, presenting themselves as “Harvey and Durrell”, at the Ballet Workshop, Mercury Theatre in London.

In 1958, Harvey's breakthrough to make a big career appeared to be imminent when she starred as Mrs Alma Exegis Diddle with Peter Sellers as The Sultan in George Tabori's play Brouhaha at the Aldwych Theatre. However, Sellers turned up sober, which made him irritated, so he found ways to deliberately sabotage the play. Harvey later recalled about Sellers: “Whatever he fancied doing, he'd do.”

In the 1970s, Harvey began to pursue a career in Spain and in 1976 she made her debut on the Spanish stage when she starred as Madame Dubonnet in Sandy Wilson's frothy musical, The Boy Friend, at the Orfeon Theatre in Mahón. Her debut was such a success that following her role she began to receive invitations to appear in concerts and cabaret on stage, especially singing Andrew Lloyd Webber's song "Don't Cry for Me Argentina".

== Personal life ==
Harvey married British television scriptwriter Richard Waring in 1957, with whom she had two sons. In 1966, Harvey shocked her family and friends when she left Waring and moved to Menorca to begin a relationship with property dealer John Bradwell, whom she married the following year. Harvey later on regretted the decision because Bradwell was an alcoholic. They eventually separated and Bradwell died in 1987.

In 2003, Harvey married Miguel Sintes. She died on 25 September 2016, aged 85. Miguel survives her with the sons from her first marriage.

== Filmography ==
- No Time for Tears (1947) as Hospital Receptionist
- Zuleika (1957) as Melisande
- The Dancing Fleece (1950)
- Up To His Neck (1954)
- Pay the Piper (1954)
- You Know What Sailors Are (1954)
- Running Wild (TV, 1954)
- Puzzle Corner (1954)
- The Howerd Crowd (TV, 1955) as a dancer
- Value for Money (1955) as a chorus girl named Rabbit Doll
- Going Up (TV, 1956)
- It's A Great Life (TV, 1956)
- Fresh Air (1956)
- Theatre Night: Brouhaha (TV, 1958) as Mrs Alma Exegis Diddle
