= Hi-De-Ho (1947 film) =

1947 film

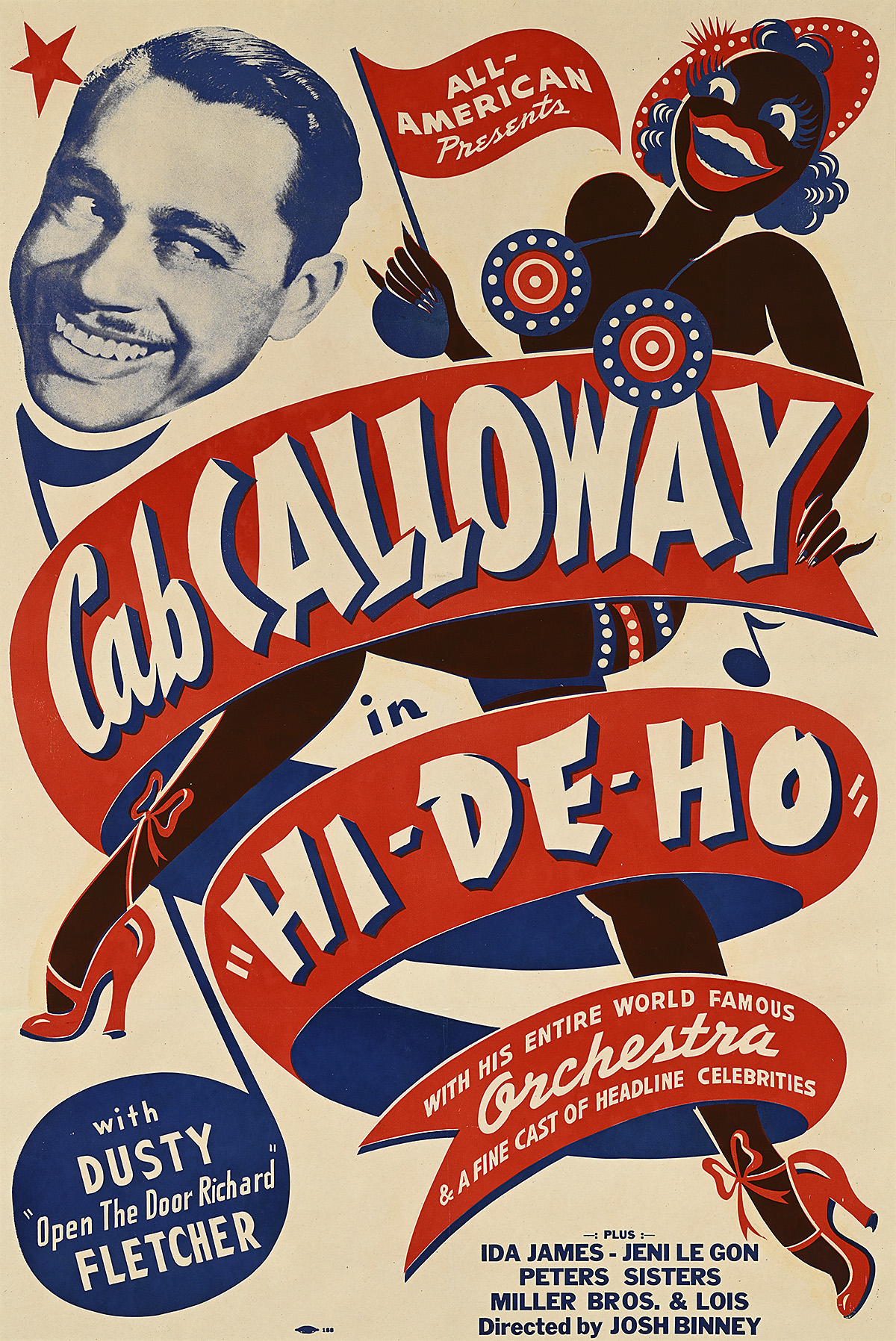
- Poster for initial theatrical release
- Directed by: Josh Binney
- Written by: Hal Seeger
- Produced by: E. M. Glucksman
- Starring: Cab Calloway; Ida James; Jeni Le Gon
- Cinematography: Don Malkames
- Edited by: Louis Hess
- Music by: Cab Calloway and his orchestra
- Distributed by: All American Entertainment
- Release date: May 9, 1947
- Running time: 63 minutes
- Country: United States
- Language: English

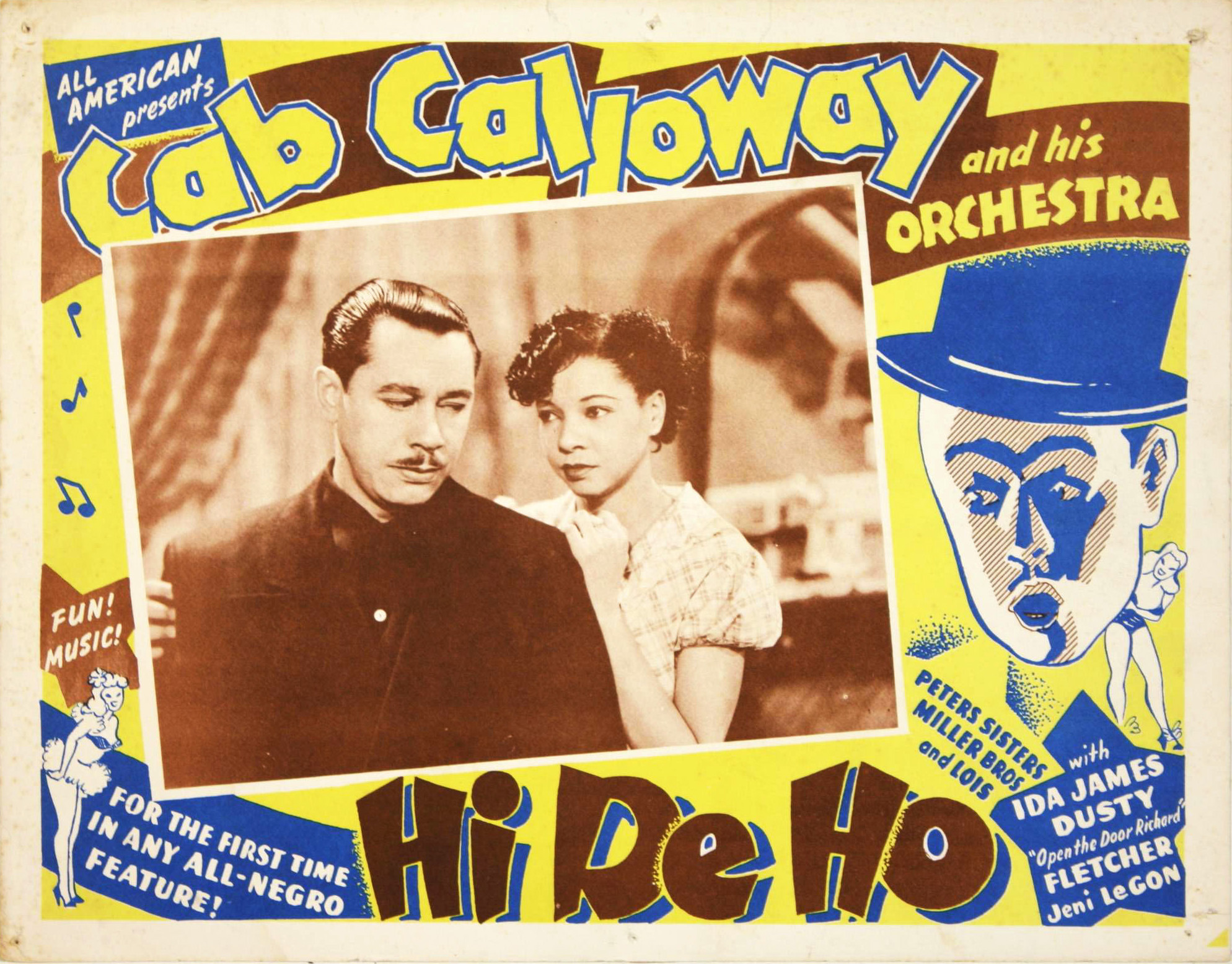
Lobby card

Full film

Hi De Ho (also known as Hi-De-Ho) is a 1947 American musical race film directed by Josh Binney. Distributed by All American Entertainment, the film stars an all African American cast, led by Cab Calloway. It first showed at the Squire Theatre in New York, and would be shown in the more than 500 African-American theaters in the US.

== Plot ==
Cab Calloway, an up and coming jazz musician is putting together a band; he is looking forward to making it big as the bandleader. His girlfriend Minnie, however, was upset that Cab has retained the services of a female band manager, Nettie, to help him promote his band and get his first big break. The manager allows the musician to get a chance to audition his jazz octet before the local owner of the new club, which he then signs the big band for its opening. Minnie becomes suspicious and jealous that Calloway's manager is doing good things for Cab and is winning points with him.

When Cab auditions with his octet, the new club owner is impressed; however, he needs a more successful band for his club's opening. Calloway promises that he could easily recruit more band members, getting the job. The band leader plays at the club's opening at week's end.

When he and his band succeed, Minnie gets intensely jealous and goes to a local "fix-it" man Boss Mason, who uses gun man Mo the Mouse as his "assistant". Calloway's wife starts to play both sides of the fence in wanting to be his girlfriend, while also trying to keep Cab in place so that his relations with Nettie have "no chance to blossom". When Boss Mason gets too close to Calloway, the jazz musician must defend himself against Mo the Mouse before the bullets fly.

== Cast ==
- Cab Calloway as himself
- Cab Calloway Orchestra with Elton Hill as themselves
- Ida James as Nettie
- Jeni Le Gon as Minnie
- William Campbell as Sparks
- George Wiltshire as Boss Mason
- James Dunmore as Mo the Mouse
- Leonard Rogers as Ralph

== Music ==
- "Minnie Was a Hepcat" (a capella) (Calloway and His Orchestra)
- "St. James Infirmary" (Calloway and His Orchestra)
- "At Dawn Time" (Calloway and His Orchestra)
- "Hey Now" (Calloway and His Orchestra)
- "The Hi De Ho Man" (Calloway and His Orchestra)
- "I Got a Gal Named Nellie" (Calloway and Elton Hill)
- "Open the Door, Richard!" (Dusty Fletcher)
- "Little Old Lady from Baltimore" (The Peters Sisters)
- "A Rainy Sunday" (The Peters Sisters)

Orchestra members include Jonah Jones, trombonist Quentin Jackson, tenor saxophonist Sam "The Man" Taylor, pianist Dave Rivera, Milt Hinton and drummer Panama Francis.

The film also features tap dancers Miller Brothers and Lois doing their routine on built up blocks and stands.

== Critical reception ==
Variety noted, "Calloway fans will find Hi De Ho right up their alley .... Story is just one of those things ... (it) is primarily an excuse for spotlighting some okay vaude acts on celluloid but the audience it's aimed at will overlook the technical deficiencies." Calloway was natural enough and Ida James and Jeni Le Gon did the best they could with the slim script.
