= Pan Pipers Music School =

Music school in Trinidad and Tobago

The Pan Pipers Music School is a music school in St. Augustine in Trinidad and Tobago. It was founded by Miss Louise McIntosh who was a student of the Trinidadian musician Winifred Atwell.

Students of Pan Pipers Music School have won numerous awards and trophies at the biennial Trinidad & Tobago Music Festival and have launched successful careers in music both in Trinidad and Tobago and abroad. The Pan Pipers Music School has also generated several winners of the annual competitions of "Twelve and under" and "Teen Talent" run by Aunt Hazel, Hazel Ward-Redman and aired on Trinidad and Tobago Television, Channels 2 & 13.
