= Jeni Le Gon =

American dancer and actress (1916–2012)

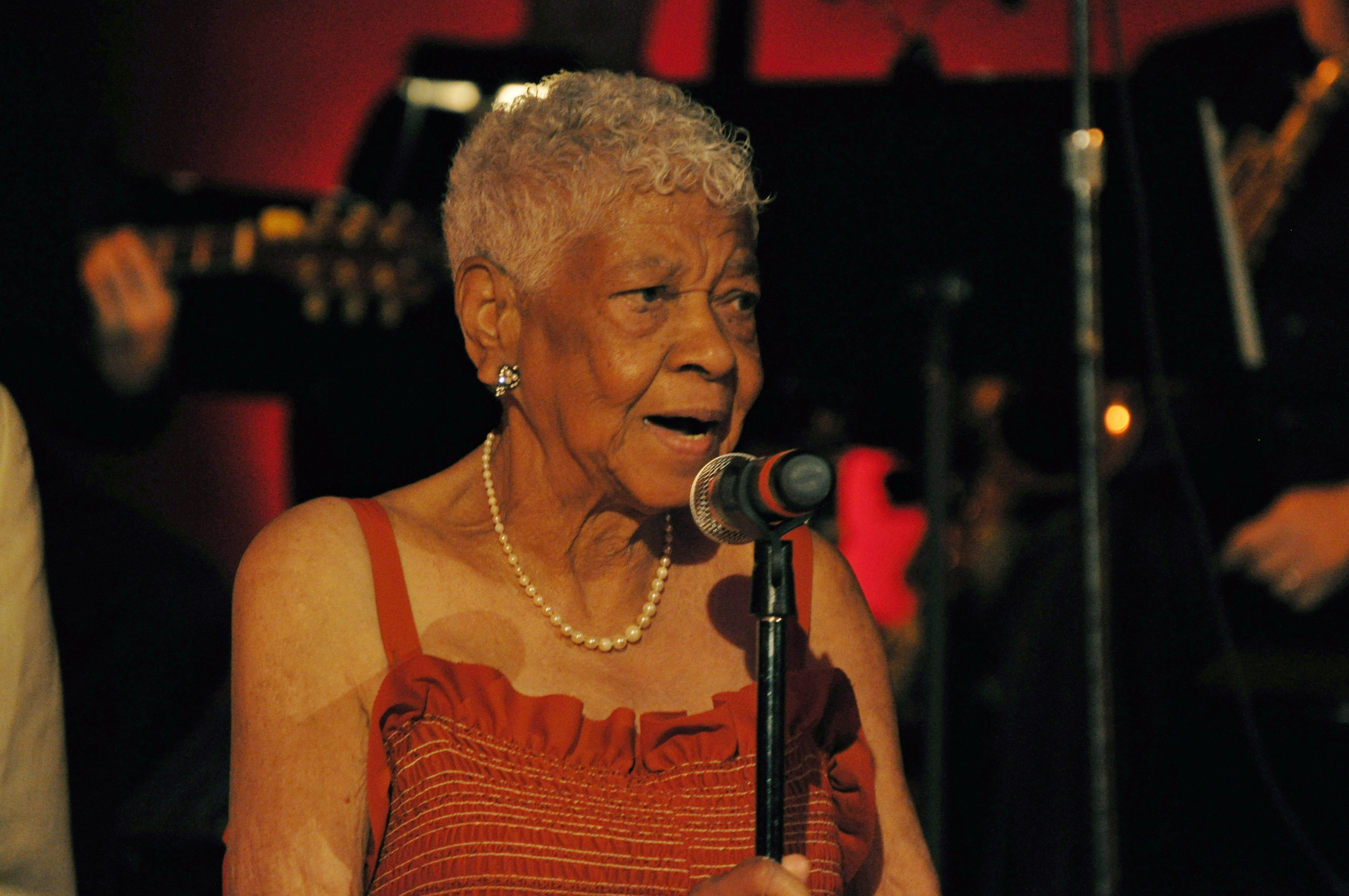
- At Masters of Lindy Hop and Tap, Century Ballroom, Seattle, Washington, 2009
- Born: Jennie Ligon; August 16, 1916; Chicago, Illinois, U.S.
- Died: December 7, 2012 (aged 96); Vancouver, British Columbia, Canada
- Occupations: Dancer, actor
- Spouse: Phil Moore

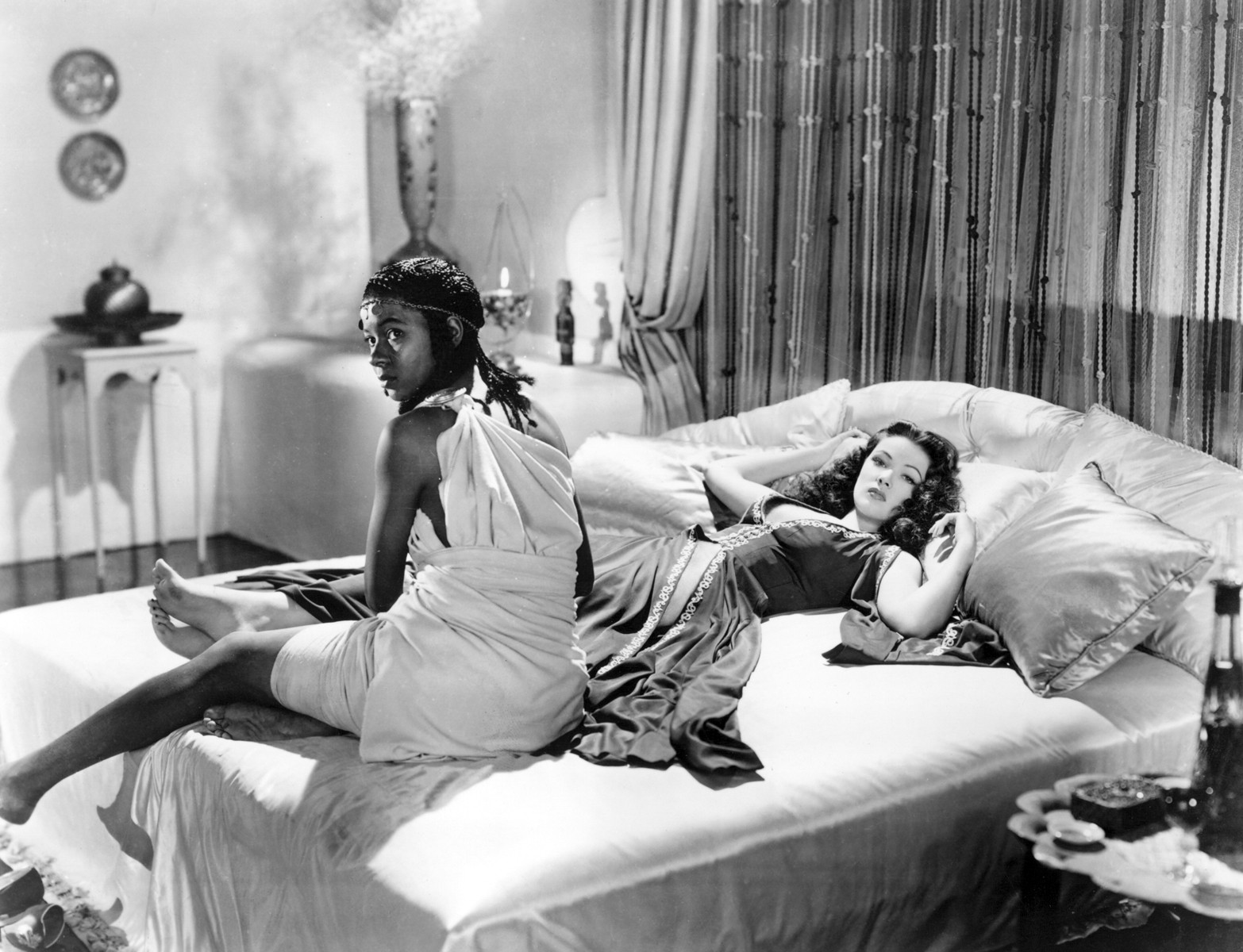
LeGon and Gene Tierney in Sundown (1941)

Jeni LeGon (born Jennie Ligon; August 14, 1916 – December 7, 2012), also credited as Jeni Le Gon, was an American dancer, dance instructor, and actress. She was one of the first African-American women to establish a solo career in tap dance.

== Early years ==
Born as Jennie Ligon in Chicago, Illinois, her parents were Hector Ligon, a chef who also worked as a railway porter, and Harriet Bell Ligon, a housewife. She grew up in the Black Belt area of Chicago and finished Sexton Elementary School in 1928. When she was 13, she successfully auditioned for the chorus line of band leader Count Basie. She attended Englewood High School for one year thereafter.

== Career ==
In 1931, LeGon began performing across the southern United States with the Whitman Sisters company. In 1933, she and her half-sister, Willa Mae Lane, formed the LeGon and Lane song-and-dance team. They were given the opportunity to go to Detroit and work with nightclub owner Leonard Reed. While there, they received an offer to travel to Hollywood and perform with composer Shelton Brooks. Upon arrival, they discovered there was, in fact, no job. LeGon heard about auditions being held by Ethel Waters' former manager, Earl Dancer. The audition was for a film that Fox Studios was producing. She won the part and subsequently appeared in dance numbers in several musicals.

In 1935, she signed with RKO Pictures to be the dancing partner of Bill Robinson in the film Hooray for Love which also featured Fats Waller. She also performed in a 1935 London production of the revue At Home Abroad, taking over numbers that Waters and Eleanor Powell had in the Broadway version.

While in Hollywood, LeGon had the opportunity to work with performers such as Waters and Al Jolson. She appeared in the film Easter Parade with Fred Astaire and partnered with Bill "Bojangles" Robinson in a tap dance, becoming the first African-American woman to do so on film. MGM signed her to a long-term contract, making LeGon the first African-American woman to receive such an opportunity, but cancellation of the contract soon followed.

On Broadway, LeGon portrayed Jenny in Black Rhythm (1936), and Lily Ann in Early to Bed (1943). In 1947, she played Cab Calloway's treacherous girlfriend Minnie the moocher in a low-budget full-length musical movie with an all-Black cast titled Hi-De-Ho. She danced at a number of clubs and theaters including the Apollo, Cafe de Paris, Howard, Paramount and Lincoln Theaters. In the early 1950s, she appeared on the televised version of Amos 'n' Andy.

LeGon starred with the Nicholas Brothers in Rusty Frank's 1989 production of Jazz Tap at Kimball's East, in Emeryville, California.

LeGon owned and operated the Jeni LeGon Dance Studio in Los Angeles and managed the Drama & Dance Playhouse in Los Angeles. In 1969, she settled in Vancouver, British Columbia, where she taught tap and pointe. In 1999, the National Film Board of Canada released a documentary film about her life, Jeni Le Gon: Living in a Great Big Way, directed by Grant Greshuk and produced by Selwyn Jacob. She appeared in the film Bones (2001).

== Personal life ==
In 1943, LeGon married composer, conductor, and pianist Phil Moore. They composed the song "The Sping", sung by Lena Horne in the film Panama Hattie.

== Recognition and papers ==
LeGon was inducted into the Black Filmmakers Hall of Fame in 1987 and into the Tap Dance Hall of Fame in 2002. Oklahoma City University awarded her an honorary doctorate in 2002.

LeGon's papers are housed at the Smithsonian Institution.

== In popular culture ==
Zadie Smith's 2016 novel, Swing Time, features two biracial young women who discover LeGon while watching videotapes of old film musicals. When they see her perform in Ali Baba Goes to Town (1937), the character Tracey "sits perched close to the TV, studying her moves, her mouth open in surprise." LeGon becomes an obsession for Tracey.

== Filmography ==
Year	Title	Role	Notes
1935	Hooray for Love	Jeni LeGon - the Ballerina	
1936	Dishonour Bright	Cabaret Dancer	
1937	Ali Baba Goes to Town	Specialty	
1937	The Adventurous Blonde	Maid	Uncredited
1938	Fools for Scandal	Singer at Le Petit Harlem	
1939	Double Deal	Nita	
1940	I Can't Give You Anything But Love, Baby	Annie	
1940	While Thousands Cheer	Myra	
1940	Glamour for Sale	Maid	Uncredited
1941	Sundown	Miriami	
1941	Birth of the Blues	Black Girl in Jail	Uncredited
1941	Bahama Passage	Mary's Maid	Uncredited
1942	This Was Paris	Cabaret Dancer	Uncredited
1942	Take My Life	Helen Stanley	
1942	Arabian Nights	Dresser	
1943	My Son, the Hero	Lambie	
1943	I Walked with a Zombie	Dancer	
1943	Stormy Weather	Dancer	Uncredited
1947	Hi-De-Ho	Minnie	
1948	Easter Parade	Essie, Nadine's Maid	Uncredited
1949	I Shot Jesse James	Veronica	
1952	Somebody Loves Me	Maid in "Rose Room" Number	Uncredited
1953	Bright Road	Martha Swife	Uncredited
1987	Home Is Where the Hart Is	Wanda Fuch	
2001	Bones	Window Granny	
