= Let's Have a Party (rag) =

Let's Have a Party is a 1953 ragtime medley by pianist Winifred Atwell. It entered the UK charts on 4 December 1953, spending nine weeks there and peaking at #2. It entered the charts again the following year, appearing on 26 November 1954 on the back of the success of Let's Have Another Party. This time, the single had a six-week run, and peaked at #14.

== Songs ==
The medley, in two parts, contains the following songs:

- "If You Knew Susie"
- "The More We Are Together"
- "That's My Weakness Now"
- "Knees Up Mother Brown"
- "Daisy Bell"
- "Boomps-a-Daisy"
- "She Was One Of The Early Birds"
- "Three O'Clock in the Morning"
