= Ray Buckingham =

Australian fencer

Personal information
- Born: 1 March 1930
- Died: 8 July 2014 (aged 84)

Sport
- Sport: Fencing

Ray Buckingham (1 March 1930 – 8 July 2014) was an Australian fencer. He competed in the team foil event at the 1956 Summer Olympics.
