= Winifred Atwell =

Trinidad and Tobago musician (c. 1910–1983)

Background information
- Born: Una Winifred Atwell; 27 February 1914 or 27 April 1910; Tunapuna, Trinidad and Tobago
- Died: 28 February 1983 Sydney, Australia
- Genres: Boogie-woogie; ragtime; classical
- Instrument: Piano
- Years active: 1946–1980
- Labels: Decca; Philips; RCA; CBS

Una Winifred Atwell (27 February or 27 April 1910 or 1914 (Note: There is some uncertainty over her date and year of birth. Many sources suggest 27 February 1914, but there is a strong suggestion that her birthday was 27 April. Most sources give her year of birth as 1914, but her gravestone states that she died at the age of 73, suggesting that she was born in 1910.) – 28 February 1983) was a pianist and composer born in the country of Trinidad who migrated to Britain and enjoyed great popularity in Britain and Australia from the 1950s with a series of boogie-woogie and ragtime hits, selling over 20 million records. She was the first black artist to have a number-one hit in the UK singles chart and had the first piano instrumental to reach number one in the UK singles chart, with "Let's Have Another Party" in 1954, and as of 2023, remains the only female instrumentalist to do so.

== Biography ==
=== Childhood ===
Atwell was born in Tunapuna in the British colony of Trinidad and Tobago. She and her parents lived in Jubilee Street. Her family owned a pharmacy and she trained as a pharmacist herself to degree level and was expected to join the family business. She played the piano from a young age and achieved considerable popularity locally. She played for American servicemen at the Air Force base (which is now the main airport).

It was while she was playing at the Servicemen's Club at Piarco that someone bet her that she could not play something in the boogie-woogie style that was popular back home in the United States. She went away and wrote "Piarco Boogie", which was later renamed "Five Finger Boogie".

=== Leaving Trinidad ===
Atwell left Trinidad in the early 1940s and travelled to the United States to study with Alexander Borovsky. She played in a concert at The Town Hall in New York on 10 May 1945, as part of a presentation by the Altruss Opera Company starring Paul A. Smith, a well-known tenor.

On 6 October 1945, it was announced that "the noted British pianist" had left for England where she would broadcast for the BBC on Tuesdays and Thursdays. In London, she gained a place at the Royal Academy of Music where she completed her musical studies. She became the first female pianist to be awarded the academy's highest grading for musicianship. To support her studies, she played rags at London clubs and theatres. From those modest beginnings in variety she went on to top the bill at the London Palladium. She said later, "I starved in a garret to get onto concert stages".

=== Life in the UK ===
On 21 October 1946, Atwell appeared on BBC TV programme Stars in Your Eyes, which was quickly followed by several radio appearances on the BBC Light Programme. In January 1947, she headed the bill of Come to the Show at the Empire Theatre, Belfast, where she was billed as "radio's most versatile pianist". Frequent radio appearances continued, including the well-known Variety Bandbox show. She appeared on the variety stages too, sometimes with another pianist called Donald Thorne.

Atwell attracted attention with an unscheduled appearance at the Casino Theatre, where she substituted for an ill star. She caught the eye of entrepreneur Bernard Delfont, who put her on a long-term contract in 1948. Atwell was championed by popular disc jockey Jack Jackson, who introduced her to Decca Records promotions manager Hugh Mendl. Mendl launched his career as a staff producer at Decca by producing Atwell's recordings. She released a number of discs for Decca in 1951 that were well received. "Jezebel" sold well, but it was another disc that catapulted her to huge popularity in the UK. A complex arrangement called "Cross Hands Boogie" was released to show her virtuoso rhythmic technique, but it was the B-side, a 1900s tune written by George Botsford called "Black and White Rag", that was to become a radio standard. The disc sold over one million copies, and was awarded a gold disc.

"Black And White Rag" started a craze for her honky-tonk style of playing. The rag was originally performed on a concert grand for the occasion, but Atwell felt it did not sound right, and so got her husband to buy a honky tonk piano for 50 shillings from a junk shop in Battersea, London, which was used for the released version of the song.

Atwell's husband, former stage comedian Lew Levisohn, was vital in shaping her career as a variety star. The two had met in 1946, and married soon afterward. They were inseparable up to Levisohn's death in Hong Kong in December 1977. They had no children. He had cannily made the choice, for stage purposes, of her playing first a concert grand, then the old upright piano from Battersea. This old piano became famous as "my other piano", and would later feature all over the world, from Las Vegas to the Sydney Opera House, travelling over half a million miles by air throughout Atwell's concert career. While contributing to a posthumous BBC Radio appreciation of Atwell's career, Richard Stilgoe revealed that he had become the owner of the famous "other piano".

When Atwell first came to Britain, she initially earned only a few pounds a week. By the mid-1950s, that had shot up to over $10,000. By 1952, her popularity had spread internationally. Her hands were insured with Lloyd's of London for £40,000, the policy stipulating that she was never to wash dishes. She signed a record contract with Decca, and her sales were soon 30,000 discs a week. She was by far the biggest-selling pianist of her time. Her 1954 hit, "Let's Have Another Party", was the first piano instrumental to reach number one in the UK Singles Chart.

She is the only holder of two gold and two silver discs for piano music in Britain, and was the first black artist in the UK to sell a million records. Millions of copies of her sheet music were sold, and she went on to record her best-known hits, including "Let's Have a Party", "Flirtation Waltz", "The Poor People of Paris" (which reached number one in the UK Singles Chart in 1956), "Britannia Rag" and "Jubilee Rag". Her signature "Black and White Rag" became famous again in the 1970s as the theme of the BBC snooker programme Pot Black, which also enjoyed great popularity in Australia when screened on the ABC network. It was during that period that she discovered Matt Monro and persuaded Decca to sign him.

Atwell's peak was in the second half of the 1950s, during which her concerts drew standing-room-only crowds in Europe and Australasia. She played three Royal Variety Performances, appeared in every capital city in Europe, and played for over twenty million people. At a private party for Queen Elizabeth II, she was called back for an encore by the monarch herself, who requested "Roll Out the Barrel". Atwell became a firm television favourite and had her own series in Britain. The first of them was Bernard Delfont Presents The Winifred Atwell Show. It ran for ten episodes on the new ITV network from 21 April to 23 June 1956, and the BBC picked up the series the following year. On a third triumphal tour of Australia, she recorded her own Australian television series, screened in 1960–1961. During her career she earned a fortune, and her fame would have extended to the US but for the obstacles caused by racial segregation. Her breakthrough appearance was to have been on The Ed Sullivan Show in 1956, but on arrival in America she was confronted with problems of selling the show in the South with a British-sounding black woman. Her appearance was never recorded. She did, however, have a guest appearance on the Arthur Godfrey show two years later.

Atwell was also a skilled interpreter of classical music. On 1 and 2 December 1954, at London's Kingsway Hall, with the London Philharmonic Orchestra conducted by Stanford Robinson, she made one of the first stereo classical recordings in the UK of a major repertoire work, the Piano Concerto in A minor, Op. 16, by Grieg. The two-channel version, engineered by Decca's Roy Wallace, appears not to have been released, but a transfer of the Decca LP (mono) LF1206 has been produced and issued by Pristine Audio as an available download. Another Decca recording by Atwell is George Gershwin's Rhapsody in Blue with Ted Heath's band, which contained an arrangement in the Glenn Miller style of the slow section.

=== Life in Australia ===
In 1955, Atwell arrived in Australia and was greeted as an international celebrity. Her tour broke box-office records on the Tivoli circuit, bringing in receipts of £600,000. She was paid AUS$5,000 a week (the equivalent of around $50,000 today), making her the highest-paid star from a Commonwealth country to visit Australia up to that time.

She toured Australia many times and made Australian guitarist, Jimmy Doyle, her musical director in the 1960s. In 1962, she made a nationwide tour of Britain, with The Winifred Atwell Show, accompanied by the Cy Bevan Group, who were with her then current radio series Pianorama. From Monday, 17 September 1962, for one week only, she gave twice-nightly performances at the Brighton Hippodrome. Also appearing with her on the bill was Ronnie Carroll, a radio and television recording star. Her popularity in Australia led to her settling in Sydney in the 1970s, and she became an Australian citizen two years before her death.

Keith Emerson noted her influence on his playing in an interview: "I've always been into ragtime. In England—and I'm sure Rick Wakeman would concur—we loved Winifred Atwell, a fantastic honky-tonk and ragtime player."

=== Later life ===
Atwell bought an apartment on the beach front in Flight Deck, an apartment complex in Collaroy in Sydney, as a jumping-off base for her worldwide performance commitments. She was a member of the Moby Dick Surf Club at Whale Beach where she performed regularly in support of the surf club. Enjoying the affection of the public, she was nevertheless keenly aware of prejudice and injustice and was outspoken about racism in Australia. She always donated her services in a charity concert on Sundays, the proceeds going to orphanages and needy children. She spoke out against the Third World conditions endured by Aboriginal Australians, which made headlines during an outback tour of the country in 1962. Dismissing racism as a factor in her own life, she said she felt she was "spoiled very much by the public". She left her estate to the Australian Guide Dogs for the Blind and a small amount to her goddaughter. However, a cousin of Lew Levisohn contested Atwell's will and is reported to have been granted $30,000 from her estate.

Atwell also created headlines in the 1960s with her dieting, slimming from 16 to 12 stone (102 to 76 kg), using what would today be called a protein diet.

In 1978, she appeared on Australian TV's This Is Your Life. At the end of the show, she played a few bars of "Black and White Rag" using her "other" piano, which had been in retirement for many years.

Though a dynamic stage personality, Atwell was known to be modest, shy and soft-spoken. Eloquent and intellectual, she was well read and informed about issues and current events. She also had an interest in cricket. She was also a devout Catholic, and played the organ for her parish church.

Atwell often returned to her native Trinidad and, on one occasion, she bought a house in Saint Augustine, which she adored and later renamed Winvilla. It was later turned into the Pan Pipers Music School by one of her students, Louise McIntosh. In 1968, Atwell recorded Ivory and Steel, an album of standards and classics, with the Pan Am Jet North Stars Steel Orchestra (director/arranger Anthony Williams), and supported musical scholarships in the West Indies. In the early 1980s, her sense of loss following her husband's death made her consider returning to Trinidad to live, but she found the weather too hot.

Atwell suffered a stroke in 1980. In 1981, she officially retired on The Mike Walsh Show, then Australia's highest-rating television variety programme. She categorically stated that she would retire and not return as a public performer, and that she had had an excellent career. Her last TV performance was "Choo Choo Samba", followed by a medley of "Black and White Rag" and "Twelfth Street Rag". Her only non-private performances from that point were as an organist in her parish church at Narrabeen.

== Death ==
In 1983, following an electrical fire that destroyed her Narrabeen home, she suffered a heart attack, and died while staying with friends in Seaforth. She is buried beside her husband, Lew Levisohn, in Northern Rivers Memorial Park, South Gundurimba in northern New South Wales, just outside Lismore. She has a piano-shaped headstone that was rumoured to have been paid for by Elton John.

== Awards ==
In 1969, Atwell was awarded Trinidad and Tobago's national award, the Gold Hummingbird Medal, for her achievements in music.

== Legacy ==
Elton John, writing in his 2019 memoir Me, described Atwell as one of his musical heroes.

In November 2020, a Nubian Jak Community Trust black plaque honouring Atwell was unveiled at the former site of a hair salon she owned in Chaucer Road, Brixton, south London. The Winifred Atwell Salon had opened in 1956, the year after Carmen Maingot became the first black woman to open a salon in London, in South Kensington (with a basement room that featured decor by fellow Trinidadian artist Althea McNish). After Atwell's Brixton salon was destroyed by fire, she opened up a second store in Mayfair.

In 2024, Queen's Hall Auditorium in Trinidad and Tobago was renamed The Winifred Atwell Auditorium.

In 2025, English Heritage decided that Atwell was to be awarded a commemorative Blue Plaque. On 1 October 2025, outside her former home at 18 Bourdon Street, Mayfair, the plaque was unveiled by Jools Holland, with YolanDa Brown among others who spoke in tribute to Atwell as "a dazzling performer and a true trailblazer".

== Discography ==
=== Albums ===
- Double Seven – Seven Rags Seven Boogies (1956), UK London Records
- Chartbusters – Winifred Atwell, Music for Leisure

=== Charting singles ===
- "Britannia Rag" (1952) – UK No. 5
- "Coronation Rag" (1953) – UK No. 5
- "Flirtation Waltz" (1953) – UK No. 10
- "Let's Have a Party" (1953) – UK No. 2
- "Rachmaninoff's 18th Variation on a Theme by Paganini (The Story of Three Loves)" (1954) – UK No. 9
- "Let's Have Another Party" (1954) – UK No. 1
- "Let's Have a Ding Dong" (1955) – UK No. 3
- "The Poor People of Paris" (1956) – UK No. 1
- "Port-au-Prince" (1956) – UK No. 18
- "Left Bank (C'Est A Hamburg)" (1956) – UK No. 14
- "Make It a Party" (1956) – UK No. 7
- "Let's Rock 'N' Roll" (1957) – UK No. 24
- "Let's Have a Ball" (1957) – UK No. 4
- "Moonlight Gambler" (1957) – US No. 16 (Music Vendor)
- "Dawning" (1958) – US No. 95 (Music Vendor)
- "The Summer of the Seventeenth Doll" (1959) – UK No. 24
- "Piano Party" (1959) – UK No. 10
- "Mexico City" (1966)
- "Five Finger Boogie" and "Rhapsody Rag" (Philips PB 182)
- "Moonlight Fiesta" and "18th Variation on a Theme of Paganini" (Philips PB 234)
