= Two of a Kind (British TV series) =

Morecambe & Wise comedy show for ATV 1961–1968

- Also known as: Sir Bernard Delfont Presents Morecambe & Wise (1st series); The Morecambe & Wise Show (opening credits of 5th and 6th series); The Piccadilly Palace (6th series, American title)
- Genre: Sketch show
- Written by: Dick Hills and Sid Green
- Starring: Morecambe and Wise
- Theme music composer: Bobby Darin and Johnny Mercer
- Ending theme: "Two of a Kind"
- Country of origin: United Kingdom
- Original language: English
- No. of series: 6
- No. of episodes: 68 (18 missing) (list of episodes)

Production
- Producer: Colin Clews
- Running time: 30 minutes (Series 1–3); 35 minutes (Series 4–5); 60 minutes (Series 6)
- Production company: ATV

Original release
- Network: ITV
- Release: 12 October 1961 – 1 October 1968

Related
- Running Wild; The Morecambe & Wise Show (BBC, 1968–1977); The Morecambe & Wise Show (ITV, 1978–1983)

Two of a Kind (sometimes titled The Morecambe & Wise Show) is an early TV series for comedy duo Morecambe and Wise. It ran from 1961 to 1968, produced by ATV for the ITV network.

== History ==
In 1954, Eric Morecambe and Ernie Wise had starred in their first television series, Running Wild on BBC Television. This had proven to be a failure, which saw the duo initially return to the variety circuit, before slowly making a return to television, with guest spots on The Winifred Atwell Show and Double Six. Their increasing success eventually led to an offer from Lew Grade, the managing director of ATV (then an ITV franchise holder), for a second attempt at a television series of their own.

With memories of their previous attempt still in their mind, the duo said that they would accept the offer from Grade if they could obtain the services of the writing team of Dick Hills and Sid Green, as well as producer Colin Clews. Once these were in situ, work could begin in earnest on the new show.

Initially, there were problems in the working relationship between the two duos; the first scripts were, to Morecambe and Wise, too crowded with people for them, as the stars of the piece, to stand out. The reception for the first shows was described by Eric Morecambe as "lukewarm to say the least". In spite of this, the writers produced more of the same, until a strike by Equity saw the television schedules decimated. However, Morecambe and Wise were members of the Variety Artistes Federation, and therefore unaffected by the strike. As a consequence, Hills and Green were forced to write sketches that were more along the lines that Morecambe and Wise were looking for. Additionally, the writers were occasionally added to the situations as "Sid and Dick", the new, general-purpose stooges.

The series introduced several catchphrases (such as "Get out of that!"; "That's not nice"; "I'll smash your face in"; and "Tea Ern?") which would stay with them throughout their careers - as well as Morecambe's famous paper bag trick - and an original opening segment which saw the pair parody other series such as The Man from U.N.C.L.E., Dixon of Dock Green and Take Your Pick. It also attracted special guests such as Pearl Carr & Teddy Johnson and The Beatles; performances of "This Boy" and "I Want to Hold Your Hand", along with a comedy skit involving the group, were released on the Anthology 1 compilation album in 1995. The celebrities were generally humiliated by the pair, and especially by Morecambe's playful insults, undermining the status of the celebrities, joking that they were "rubbish" and pretending not to recognise them. Generally, the higher the status of the celebrities, the greater the humiliation.

The sixth Morecambe and Wise series for ATV was planned from the start to be aired in the United Kingdom as well as exported to the United States and Canada. It was taped in colour and starred international guests, often American. Prior to its British run, it was broadcast in North America by ABC as a summer replacement for re-runs of The Hollywood Palace under the title The Piccadilly Palace from May 20 to September 9, 1967. The duo had appeared in the U.S. on editions of The Ed Sullivan Show on CBS, and had hoped that the opportunity of a series on American television might lead to a breakthrough in their status there. However, negotiations for a longer run broke down when the show's ratings, although strong in Canada, proved disappointing in the United States. Lew Grade, who represented the comedians in the negotiations, said in his autobiography that the disappointing American ratings were a result of the comedians' refusal to slow down their fast-paced act.

In 1968, Lew Grade began negotiations for a new deal to retain Morecambe and Wise at ATV for another three years. However, at that time, the duo were anxious to take advantage of the technological advancements that were coming through in television, most notably the advent of colour. ATV at the time were not in a position to offer this and so, in spite of the financial package offered, Morecambe and Wise instead accepted an offer to return to the BBC.

== Archive status ==
The first series was billed as Sir Bernard Delfont Presents Morecambe & Wise, with the Two of a Kind title not used until the second series. This first series is completely missing, but all episodes broadcast under the Two of a Kind title (Series 2–5) exist. Only two of the episodes recorded in colour for Series 6 (The Piccadilly Palace) are extant, as black & white telerecordings.

== Awards and nominations ==
Year	Award	Nominee	Category	Result	Reference
1964	BAFTA TV Awards	Eric Morecambe; Ernie Wise	Best Light Entertainment Personality	Won	
1964	BAFTA TV Awards	Colin Clews	Best Light Entertainment Programme	Won	

== Home media releases ==
Beginning in 1993 a Best Of compilation of VHS videos totalling six volumes were released comprising material from all series, these omitted advertisement breaks and musical guest stars and did not always feature chronological sequences.

The first complete series titled Morecambe & Wise - Two of a Kind: The Complete First Series on Region 2 was released on 18 August 2011 leading to some conjecture that it is in fact the second series (see above) but this is in fact the first series of Two of a Kind.

Network released a DVD in 2016 of The Complete Series of the Two of a Kind canon containing 48 episodes from the first 4 series. The last series is mostly lost but two of the episodes, that were originally transmitted in colour, exist but in black and white and are featured on the 8th disk of this 8 DVD set which is full of extra appearances of the duo on variety shows from the 1950s and 60s. In 2021, Network announced plans to re-release all of the remaining episodes of Two of a Kind in a single box set with all episodes of Morecambe & Wise's 1978–1983 series for Thames Television, to be titled as Morecambe & Wise at ITV.
