= The Morecambe & Wise Show (1978 TV series) =

British television comedy sketch series (1978–1983)

- Genre: Sketch show
- Written by: Barry Cryer and John Junkin (1978); Eddie Braben (1980–83)
- Starring: Eric Morecambe; Ernie Wise
- Theme music composer: Arthur Kent and Sylvia Dee
- Ending theme: Bring Me Sunshine
- Country of origin: United Kingdom
- Original language: English
- No. of series: 4
- No. of episodes: 33 (list of episodes)

Production
- Producers: Keith Beckett (1978–79); John Ammonds (1980–82); Mark Stuart (1983)
- Running time: 30–65 minutes
- Production company: Thames Television

Original release
- Network: ITV
- Release: 18 October 1978 – 26 December 1983

Related
- Running Wild; Two of a Kind; The Morecambe & Wise Show (1968–1977)

The Morecambe & Wise Show is a comedy sketch show originally produced by Thames Television and broadcast on the ITV network. The second show to be broadcast under the title, (Note: The duo's first show for ITV was officially called "The Morecambe & Wise Show" but was universally known as "Two of a Kind") it was the fourth and final television series by English comedy double-act Morecambe and Wise, and saw their return to ITV after their successful nine-year association with the BBC.

== History ==
In January 1978, Eric Morecambe and Ernie Wise, just over four weeks after the broadcast of their successful 1977 Christmas Show on BBC1, which attracted an audience of just over 21m, announced that they had signed a contract with Thames Television to produce new shows for broadcast on ITV. This marked a return to commercial television for the pair, who between 1961 and 1968 had produced six series for ATV. While their time at the BBC had been both a critical and ratings success, Morecambe and Wise retained an ambition to make films. This was something that the BBC was not in a position to enable them to do, for at the time the Corporation did not have a motion picture production arm. (Note: BBC Films was not set up until 1990) Although the offers were evenly matched in financial terms, the fact that Thames Television, through its film production company Euston Films, was able to offer Morecambe and Wise the opportunity to make a film, persuaded them to leave the BBC.

Although Thames succeeded in persuading Morecambe and Wise to move, they were unsuccessful in their attempt to get the various individuals that worked alongside the duo in their productions to also make the switch: Ernest Maxin, who had been their producer/director since 1975, declined to leave, while Eddie Braben had an exclusive contract and was unable to write for anyone outside the BBC. As a consequence, Thames needed to make other arrangements for the upcoming production of their first shows. Keith Beckett was recruited as producer, while Barry Cryer and John Junkin, who had written sketches for Morecambe and Wise at the BBC, were brought in to do the scripts for their upcoming shows. For the first year with Thames, there was no series planned, with instead a single introductory special, plus the Christmas show, the only shows to be broadcast in 1978, with a plan for a subsequent series.

In March 1979, Eric Morecambe suffered a second heart attack. (Note: Morecambe suffered his first heart attack in November 1968) Following a heart bypass operation, he was forced into an extended period of recuperation, with the result that there was no series that year, with their only appearance being a low-key Christmas special that was largely an extended interview with David Frost. By February 1980, Morecambe had regained his health sufficiently to start work on the first series for Thames. This saw the duo reunited with John Ammonds, their producer at the BBC from 1968 to 1974, who had agreed to take on the same role for them. Additionally, Ammonds had made an arrangement with Eddie Braben to come and write for them as soon as he was available at the end of his contract with the BBC. However, when the first series, which was eventually broadcast in September 1980, began, its running time had been reduced to 30 minutes, including a commercial break, which Braben found significantly more restrictive than the 45–50 minutes he had had at the BBC. The struggle that Braben had to come up with fresh material led to increasing reuse of old ideas, while both Morecambe and Wise appeared to be less enamoured either with the process or product of their work. Morecambe in particular had intimated that, after nearly forty years of working together, he wanted to do things away from the partnership. Although they continued to work, producing four series for Thames, by 1983 – having completed work on both that year's series and the planned film, which was produced as Night Train to Murder – Morecambe and Wise seemed agreed that the time had come to end their partnership.

== Reception ==
Although the show received healthy ratings from the beginning, they were never at the same level as they had during the latter years at the BBC. The 1978 Christmas Show received in the region of 1.5m fewer viewers than the record-breaking effort of the previous year, while critics were only mildly complementary, with one describing it as "a somewhat grey-haired show". Ratings continued to drop as the series progressed, eventually garnering between 11m to 14m by the fourth and final series. The final Christmas Show, broadcast on Boxing Day 1983, was watched by 11.2m viewers.

== Aftermath ==
By 1984, Eric Morecambe had determined to enter a period of semi-retirement, as, in spite of the success of his heart operation five years previously, there were still worries about the state of his health. Indeed, during production of the 1983 Christmas Show, the filming of a sequence had led to him spending two nights in hospital after his heart went out of rhythm. So, he sought to stop working and spend more time on things he enjoyed. This was especially the case with writing – he had completed and published a novel, Mr Lonely, while convalescing after his operation, and had written two children's books, The Reluctant Vampire and The Vampire's Revenge. During the beginning of 1984 he was completing a book about one of his other passions, fishing, and was in the process of writing a second adult novel. As the year progressed, concerns about his heart continued, to the extent that in May it was suggested he go for tests at the Harefield Hospital. He agreed to arrange this once he had completed some commitments over the Spring Bank Holiday weekend. It was during one of these, a light-hearted question-and-answer event with his friend Stan Stennett in Tewkesbury, that, on 27 May 1984, Morecambe suffered his third, and fatal, heart attack.

Unlike his partner, Ernie Wise had little desire to retire, seeking out opportunities to continue working: in 1985, he toured a one-man show in Australia, while in 1987 he made a return to the West End stage after forty-one years, in Drood (a musical version of The Mystery of Edwin Drood), before subsequently appearing in Run For Your Wife, and writing an autobiography. He was also a regular panellist on the game show What's My Line (on which Morecambe had also made some of his last TV appearances in early 1984), as well as making several appearances in "Dictionary Corner" on Countdown, and writing a column on gardening for the News of the World. In 1993 he made his first appearance in pantomime without Morecambe, when he played the King in a production of Sleeping Beauty at the Theatre Royal, Windsor. In the same year he suffered the first of two strokes, the second of which, in 1995, led to him deciding to retire from showbusiness. In December 1998, he suffered two successive heart attacks in a week while on holiday in Florida, and underwent a triple heart bypass operation. Having been flown back to the UK, Wise died on 21 March 1999.

== Home media releases ==
In 1980, Thames released a pair of VHS tapes; the first was the complete 1980 Christmas show, while the other was a compilation from the three that Morecambe and Wise had produced for the company at that point.

The first shows from the Thames era, including the one-off special from 1978, seasonal shows from 1978 and 1980 and the David Frost programme from Christmas 1979 was released on DVD by the Network imprint on 11 April 2008, together with a second disc including the first series of Thames programmes from 1980. This was followed by a one-disc release, also by Network, which featured only the three seasonal specials from 1978 to 1980. In 2021, Network announced plans to release the remaining three series, and all of the specials, in a box set of all of the duo's work with Thames Television, along with a larger box set containing all of their existing output for ITV, including all of the remaining episodes of Two of a Kind, their 1961–1968 series for ATV. Additionally, a separate release of the pair's Christmas specials for Thames was also announced.
