= The Winifred Atwell Show =

1956 British TV series

The Winifred Atwell Show was the title of both a British TV and radio series in the mid-1950s. They starred pianist Winifred Atwell, who had had a number of hits on the UK charts.

== Television ==
The television series was broadcast 21 April to 23 June 1956 on ITV as Bernard Delfont Presents the Winifred Atwell Show. The series was initially booked by ITV for 6 episodes, but this was extended to 10 by popular demand. Regulars included singing act Teddy Johnson and Pearl Carr and the comedy act Morecambe and Wise. The show switched to the BBC for 7 weekly episodes starting 13 April 1957. All episodes of both series are believed to be lost.

Atwell did a later TV series in the early 1960s called The Amazing Miss A, of which most episodes survive.

She was likely the first black woman to have her own series on British television.

== Radio ==
A separate 15 minute "The Winifred Atwell Show" ran on Radio Luxembourg on Sunday evenings from 1954 to 1960, sponsored by Currys. The show also featured Johnson and Carr and was recorded in front of live audiences at various locations around England. At least one radio episode is available online.
