= John Drainie =

Canadian actor and television presenter

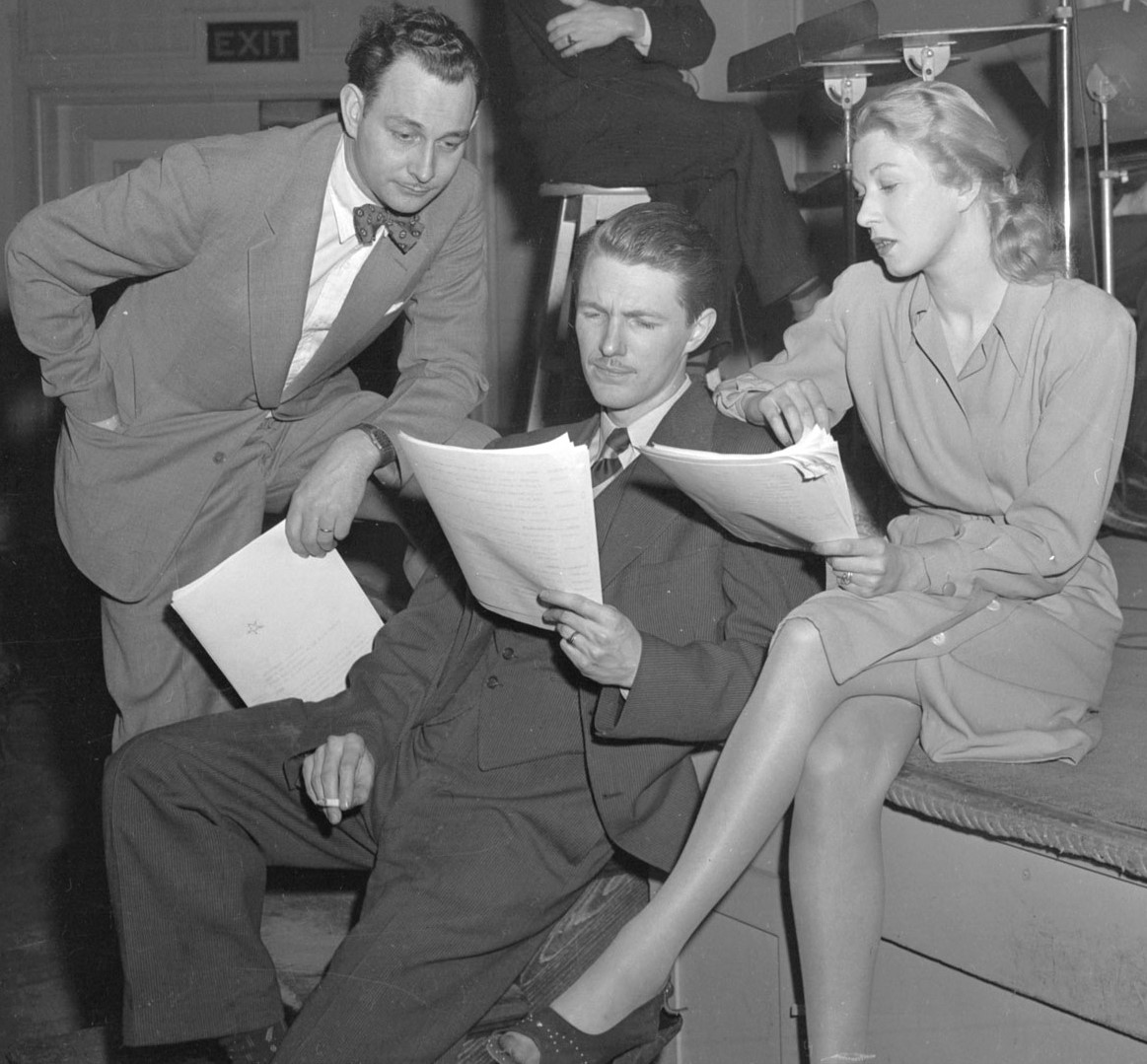
- Drainie (center) c. 1946
- Born: John Robert Roy Drainie; April 1, 1916; Vancouver, British Columbia, Canada
- Died: October 30, 1966 (aged 50); Toronto, Ontario, Canada
- Occupations: Radio and television actor, television presenter
- Known for: The Investigator, This Hour Has Seven Days

John Robert Roy Drainie (April 1, 1916 – October 30, 1966) was a Canadian actor and television presenter, who was called "the greatest radio actor in the world" by Orson Welles.

Drainie was most famous in Canada for two long-running roles: the lead role of Jake in the radio adaptation of W. O. Mitchell's Jake and the Kid, and a popular one-man stage show in which he played humourist Stephen Leacock. As well, he played Matthew Cuthbert in the 1956 CBC film adaptation of Anne of Green Gables, the narrator in the CBC's 1952 series Sunshine Sketches, and Jake in the 1963 version of Jake and the Kid.

Drainie began his career in radio with CJOR, CKNW and CBU in Vancouver. He was one of a group of actors, including Fletcher Markle, Alan Young, Lister Sinclair, Len Peterson, Arthur Hill, Bernie Braden and Andrew Allan, who emerged in Vancouver prior to World War II, and eventually moved to Toronto to become part of the CBC's "Golden Age of Radio".

Drainie and Ruth Springford once appeared in a radio play by Peterson, during which Springford apparently forgot that she had one more scene, and left the studio early. Drainie reportedly improvised a monologue until the director grabbed another actress and thrust her into the scene, at which point Drainie ad libbed his way back into the script. The radio audience reportedly never realized that anything was amiss. He also worked with other notables throughout his long radio career, including Jane Mallett, Toby Robins, Barry Morse, James Doohan, and Christopher Plummer.

In 1954 he voiced an "extraordinarily lifelike imitation" of the character modelled after Joseph McCarthy in the satirical radio play The Investigator, written by Reuben Ship, himself deported by the INS to Canada in 1953 following anti-communist HUAC hearings.

In 1963 Drainie played Professor Hunter in the classic Walt Disney film The Incredible Journey. In 1964, he was also a cohost with Laurier Lapierre of the controversial newsmagazine series This Hour Has Seven Days. Ill with cancer, Drainie left the series in its second year, and was replaced by Patrick Watson.

Drainie died from cancer at the age of 50 on October 30, 1966. His widow, Claire, subsequently married Canadian theatre impresario Nathan A. Taylor. John and Claire Drainie's eldest daughter, Bronwyn Drainie, is a noted Canadian journalist and broadcaster who wrote a biography of her father, Living the Part: John Drainie and the Dilemma of Canadian Stardom, in 1988.

Two major Canadian awards, ACTRA's John Drainie Award and the Writers' Trust of Canada's Drainie-Taylor Biography Prize, were named in Drainie's honour. He was also posthumously inducted into the BC Entertainment Hall of Fame with a Star Walk plaque on Granville Street.
