= The Girl on the Boat =

1922 novel by P. G. Wodehouse

First edition (U.S.)

The Girl on the Boat is a novel by P. G. Wodehouse. It first appeared in 1921 as a serial in the Woman's Home Companion in the United States under the title Three Men and a Maid.

It was first published as a book in the United States on April 26, 1922, by George H. Doran, New York, and as The Girl on the Boat in the United Kingdom by Herbert Jenkins, London, on June 15, 1922.

== Plot ==
The "maid" of the title is red-haired, dog-loving Wilhelmina "Billie" Bennett, and the three men are:

- Bream Mortimer, a long-time and long-suffering suitor of Billie;
- Eustace Hignett, a shy poet who is cowed by his domineering mother but secretly engaged to Billie at the opening of the tale;
- Sam Marlowe, Eustace's dashing cousin, who falls in love with Billie "at first sight".

The four of them find themselves together on a White Star ocean liner called the Atlantic, sailing for England. Also on board is a capable young woman, Jane Hubbard, who is in love with Eustace. Wodehousian funny stuff ensues, with happy endings for all except Bream Mortimer.

== Film adaptation ==
A film adaptation was made in 1962, starring Norman Wisdom as Sam Marlowe, Richard Briers as Eustace Hignett, Philip Locke as Bream Mortimer, and Millicent Martin as Billie Bennett. It was directed by Henry Kaplan. The screenplay was adapted from Wodehouse's novel by Reuben Ship.

Some scenes from the novel (e.g., Sam Marlowe's blackface performance at the ship's concert) were not included in the film. The romance between Eustace and Jane Hubbard (played by Sheila Hancock) was also altered; Eustace stands up to his domineering mother in the film but not in the book.
