= Drainie-Taylor Biography Prize =

- Awarded for: English-language Canadian works of biography, autobiography or memoir
- Country: Canada
- Presented by: Writers' Trust of Canada and Claire Drainie Taylor
- First award: 1999
- Final award: 2006

The Drainie-Taylor Biography Prize was a Canadian literary award, presented by the Writers' Trust of Canada to a work judged as the year's best work of biography, autobiography or personal memoir by a Canadian writer.

Created in 1998, the award was named in honour of Nathan A. Taylor, one of the country's leading entertainment impresarios, and actor John Drainie. Writer and actor Claire Drainie Taylor, the award's benefactor, was married to Drainie from 1942 until his death in 1966, and was subsequently married to Taylor until his death in 2004.

The first award was presented in November 1999. For the remainder of the award's existence, however, the award was presented in the spring of the year following the year in which the eligible works were published. The final award was presented in March 2006 to honor works published in 2005.

The award was discontinued after 2006, in favour of an expanded prize package for the Writers' Trust Prize for Nonfiction.

== Nominees and winners ==
Year	Winner	Nominated
1999	François Ricard (author) and Patricia Claxton (translator), Gabrielle Roy: A Life	Wayson Choy, Paper Shadows: A Chinatown Childhood; David Frank, J.B. McLachlan: A Biography; Wayne Johnston, Baltimore's Mansion; Stacy Schiff, Vera
2000	Trevor Herriot, River in a Dry Land: A Prairie Passage	Irena F. Karafilly, The Stranger in the Plumed Hat; A. B. McKillop, The Spinster & the Prophet: Florence Deeks, H.G. Wells and the Mystery of the Purloined Past
2001	Ken McGoogan, Fatal Passage	Clark Blaise, Time Lord; Susan Crean, The Laughing One; Carol Shields, Jane Austen; Jack Todd, The Taste of Metal: A Deserter's Story
2002	Warren Cariou, Lake of the Prairies: A Story of Belonging	Andrew Clark, A Keen Soldier: The Execution of Private Harold Joseph Pringle; Charlotte Gray, Flint & Feather: The Life and Times of E. Pauline Johnson, Tekahionwake; Jerry Kobalenko, The Horizontal Everest: Extreme Journey on Ellesmere Island; Neil Peart, Ghost Rider: Travels on the Healing Road
2003	Geoffrey Stevens, The Player: The Life and Times of Dalton Camp	Paul Adams, Summer of the Heart: Saving Alexandre; Kevin Bazzana, Wondrous Strange: The Life and Art of Glenn Gould; Joel Yanofsky, Mordecai & Me: An Appreciation of a Kind
2004	Peter C. Newman, Here Be Dragons: Telling Tales of People, Passion and Power	Shaughnessy Bishop-Stall, Down to This: Squalor and Splendour in a Big-City Shantytown; Charles Montgomery, The Last Heathen: Encounters with Ghosts and Ancestors in Melanesia; Harry Thurston, A Place Between the Tides: A Naturalist's Reflections on the Salt Marsh
2005	Nelofer Pazira, A Bed of Red Flowers: In Search of My Afghanistan	Michael Bliss, Harvey Cushing: A Life in Surgery; Michael Mitchell, The Molly Fire; William Sampson, Confessions of an Innocent Man: Torture and Survival in a Saudi Prison
