= There Was a Crooked Man (1960 film) =

1960 British comedy film by Stuart Burge

- Directed by: Stuart Burge
- Screenplay by: Reuben Ship
- Based on: The Golden Legend of Shults; 1939 play by James Bridie
- Produced by: John Bryan; Albert Fennell
- Starring: Norman Wisdom; Alfred Marks; Andrew Cruickshank
- Cinematography: Arthur Ibbetson
- Edited by: Peter R. Hunt
- Music by: Kenneth V. Jones
- Production company: Knightsbridge Films
- Distributed by: United Artists Corporation
- Release date: 1960
- Running time: 107 minutes
- Country: United Kingdom
- Language: English

There Was a Crooked Man is a 1960 British comedy film directed by Stuart Burge and starring Norman Wisdom, Alfred Marks, Andrew Cruickshank, Reginald Beckwith and Susannah York. It is based on the James Bridie play The Golden Legend of Schults. The film was one of two independent films (the other being The Girl on the Boat (1962)) in which Wisdom appeared in an effort to extend his range, as British audiences strongly identified him with his Gump character.

The film's title is taken from the English nursery rhyme "There Was a Crooked Man".

== Plot ==
A naïve explosives expert is tricked into working for a criminal gang.

== Cast ==
- Norman Wisdom as Davy Cooper
- Alfred Marks as Adolf Carter
- Andrew Cruickshank as McKillup
- Reginald Beckwith as stationmaster
- Susannah York as Ellen
- Jean Clarke as Freda
- Timothy Bateson as Flash Dan
- Paul Whitsun-Jones as restaurant gentleman
- Fred Griffiths as taxi driver
- Ann Hefferman as hospital sister
- Rosalind Knight as nurse
- Reed De Rouen as Dutchman
- Brian Oulton as Ashton
- Glyn Houston as smoking machinist
- Percy Herbert as prison warden
- Edna Petrie as woman at Assembly Hall
- Jack May as Police Sergeant
- Ronald Fraser as General Cummins
- Ed Devereaux as American Colonel
- Sam Kydd as foreman
- Redmond Phillips as padre
- George Murcell as receptionist at "The McKillup Arms"

== Production ==
Hugh Stewart, who produced several of Wisdom's films for the Rank Organisation, stated that the film was financed by United Artists based on the success of The Square Peg (1959).

== Reception ==
=== Box office ===
Kinematograph Weekly called There Was a Crooked Man a "money maker" at the British box office in 1960.

=== Critical ===
The Monthly Film Bulletin wrote: "Out of the rut in its satiric conception but uneven in quality, this is very much a one-man show, with Norman Wisdom at last achieving a personally sharp and distinctive comedy identity. Though the film relies mainly on parody, the best episodes are the frankly slapstick ones: Norman sharing a shower unobserved with a financier, Norman caught in the machinery of the wool factory, above all the climactic orgy of destruction, helped by Andrew Cruickshank's refreshing switch from straight "heavy" to farce. Otherwise there is too much that is sluggish and inconclusive, and the style does not always fit the mood."

The Radio Times Guide to Films gave the film 4/5 stars, writing: "Even some of those generally left cold by clown Norman Wisdom admit that this is one of his best films. This comedy allowed him to show more versatility, although he holds fast to his "poor but honest" persona, inspired by Chaplin. Released from jail, Wisdom teams up with crooks to outwit the venal mayor of a northern town. Alfred Marks as the gang boss and Andrew Cruickshank as the mayor are excellent foils."

Leslie Halliwell wrote: "Semi-happy attempt to humanize a knockabout clown; good supporting performances and production."

== Release and home media ==
The film was commercially unavailable for many years. It was aired by ITV on Boxing Day 1965. Wisdom biographer Richard Dacre wrote that he, Wisdom and director Stuart Burge were present when the Barbican Centre Cinema in London presented the next known public screening at a "Wisdom Weekend" in 1998. In 2008, it was shown in Darwen, Lancashire, where location shots had been filmed in 1960.

The film was released on DVD on 8 May 2017 and as a Blu-ray disc on 30 April 2018.
