= Gil Courtemanche =

Canadian progressive journalist and novelist

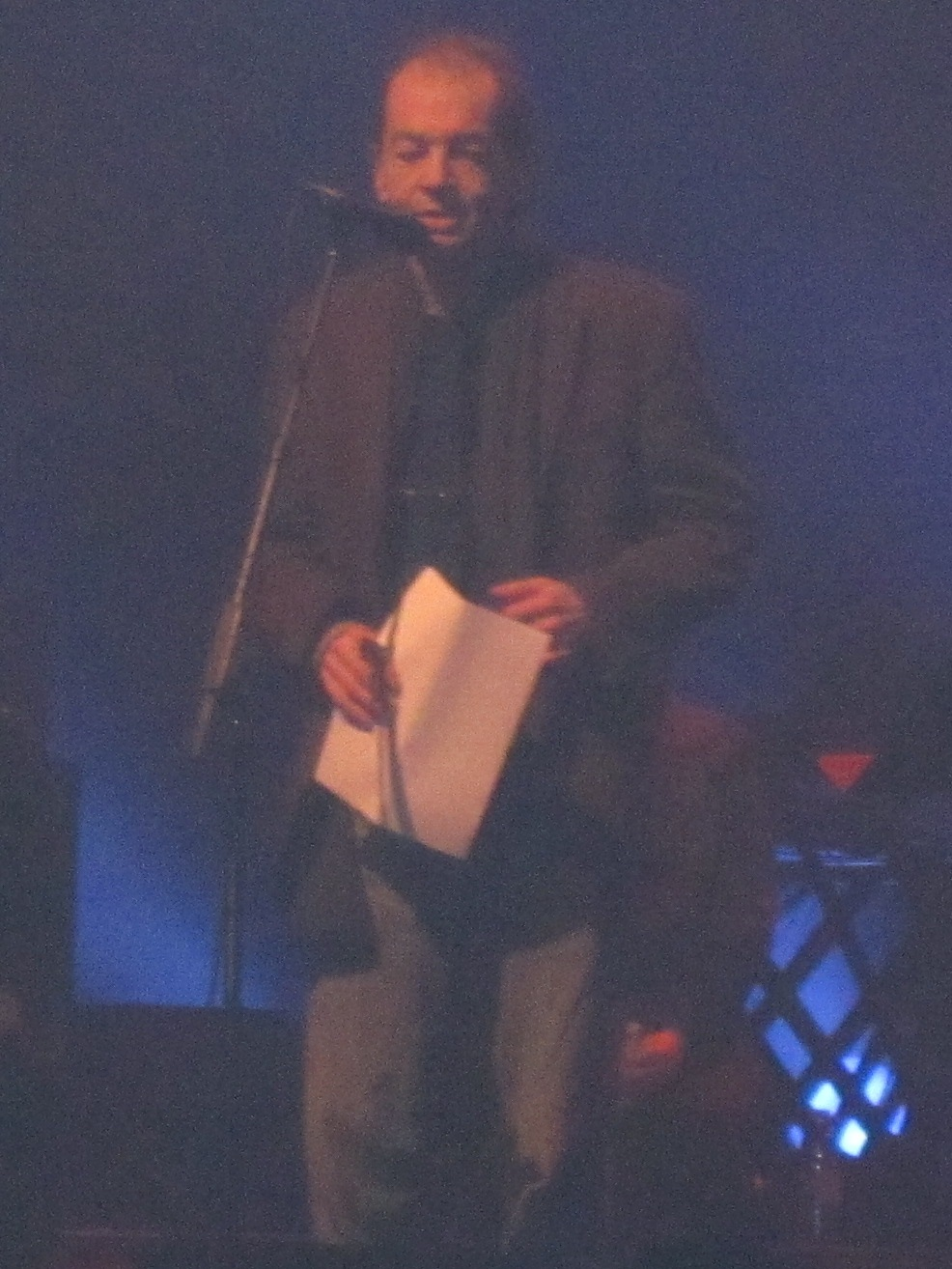
Gil Courtemanche speaks to locked-out journalists on the stage of Montreal's Metropolis, at the second "Show du cadenas" in January 2011.

Gil Courtemanche (August 18, 1943 – August 19, 2011) was a Canadian progressive journalist and novelist in low-income countries and international politics. He wrote for the Montreal newspaper Le Devoir.

== Life and career ==
Courtemanche was born in Montreal, Quebec. He began his career as a journalist in 1962, with several collaborations with Radio-Canada including Le 60, Métro Magazine and Présent National. He later created L'Évènement, a television program with Radio-Canada which he also hosted between 1978 and 1980. During the same period, he was also an editorialist with CBOT, an Ottawa radio station. In 1978, he hosted Contact, the first public affairs magazine for Télé-Québec. Between 1980 and 1986, he worked as a host, analyst and correspondent for the programs Télémag, Première Page and Le Point with Radio-Canada.

Courtemanche helped found the sovereigntist and social democrat newspaper Le Jour, and also worked as a journalist with La Presse. From 1986, he worked on various publications such as Alternatives and Le Libraire. He published columns on international politics in Le Soleil, Le Droit, and Le Devoir.

He participated in making documentaries, including the series Soleil dans la nuit for TV5 Europe-Afrique-Canada, on the first anniversary of the Rwandan genocide. He also filmed a documentary on AIDS entitled The Gospel of AIDS. Furthermore, he helped produced various documentaries and advertisements on the third-world for Le Cardinal Léger et ses œuvres and OXFAM-Québec: leprosy in Haiti, the politics of water, agricultural development in the Philippines, education for disabled children in Thailand, etc.

His first novel, Un dimanche à la piscine à Kigali, which documents the Rwandan genocide of 1994, was published in 2000. It was chosen for inclusion in the French version of Canada Reads, broadcast on Radio-Canada in 2004, where it was defended by writer, environmentalist and activist Laure Waridel. Un dimanche à la piscine à Kigali eventually won the contest. It was filmed as A Sunday in Kigali (Un dimanche à Kigali).

== Death ==
Courtemanche died August 19, 2011, from cancer, one day after his 68th birthday.

== Bibliography ==
- Douces colères (1989)
- Trente artistes dans un train (1989)
- Chroniques internationales (1991)
- Québec (1998)
- Nouvelles douces colères (1999)
- Un dimanche à la piscine à Kigali (2000). Translated into English as A Sunday at the Pool in Kigali by Patricia Claxton (2003)
- La Seconde Révolution tranquille – Démocratiser la démocratie (essay) (2003)
- Une belle mort (2005)
- Le monde, le lézard et moi (2009)
- Je ne veux pas mourir seul (2010)

== Awards and recognition ==
- Winner: Prix des Libraires, 2000
- Winner: National Magazine Award for Political Reporting, 1998
- Nominee 2003 – Governor General's Award (French to English translation)
- Nominee 2004 – Rogers Writers' Trust Fiction Prize
