= The Bloody Brood =

1959 film

- Directed by: Julian Roffman
- Written by: Anne Howard Bailey; Ben Kerner; Elwood Ullman
- Produced by: Julian Roffman
- Cinematography: Eugen Schüfftan
- Edited by: Robert Johnson
- Music by: Harry Freedman
- Production companies: Meridian Studios; Julian Roffman Productions
- Distributed by: Allied Artists Pictures
- Release date: October 1959
- Running time: 80 minutes
- Country: Canada
- Language: English
- Budget: $87,000-90,000

The Bloody Brood is a 1959 Canadian thriller film directed by Julian Roffman.

== Premise ==
A man begins to investigate on his own the death of his brother, who died from eating a hamburger laced with ground glass. With the police case stalled because of ineptness, the man's own investigation leads him toward a beatnik hang-out frequented by Nico (Peter Falk), a shady character who supplies drugs to the patrons and philosophizes about the ills of the world.

== Cast ==
- Jack Betts as Cliff
- Barbara Lord as Ellie
- Peter Falk as Nico
- Robert Christie as Detective McLeod
- Ron Hartmann as Francis
- Anne Collings as A Model
- W. B. Brydon as Studs
- George Sperdakos as Ricky
- Ron Taylor as Dave
- Michael Zenon as Weasel
- William R. Kowalchuk as Roy
- Sammy Sales as Louis
- Kenneth Wickes as Paul the Poet
- Carol Starkman as Blonde Neighbor
- Rolf Colstan as Stephanex

== Production ==
Julian Roffman and Ralph Foster formed Meridian Films in 1954, and Roffman chose to direct its first feature film, The Bloody Brood. The film was shot over the course of sixteen days in May 1959, on a budget of $87,000-90,000, with financial backing from Roffman and Nat Taylor. It was made as the top picture for a double feature. Taylor's wife, Yvonne, was an associated producer. Roffman and Taylor later worked together on The Mask.

The production interiors were lensed at the Community Theatre, on Woodbine Avenue, in Toronto, a cinema that had been earlier retrofitted for use as a TV studio after 1955. Ralph Foster and Julian Roffman founded Meridian Studios in 1954.

== Release ==
The film was distributed by Allied Artists and premiered on 26 October 1959, in Toronto. It was banned by the Alberta Censorship Board and the ban was upheld on appeal. It was financially unsuccessful. The National Legion of Decency listed the film in class B as morally objectionable in part for all. The MPAA's censorship board called for the film to be edited before its American release.

== Reception ==
Author and film critic Leonard Maltin awarded the film two out of four stars, calling it "[A] laughable, thoroughly cynical depiction of the Beat Generation." Gerald Pratley, writing in Variety, stated that "Only Roffman's virile direction and deft editing, together with the convincing portrayals of the cast, prevent the entire production from collapsing into comic absurdity".

== Works cited ==
- Morris, Peter, ed. (1970). Canadian Feature Films: 1913-69 Part 1: 1913-40. Canadian Film Institute.
- Turner, D. John, ed. (1987). Canadian Feature Film Index: 1913-1985. Canadian Film Institute. ISBN 0660533642.
- Vatnsdal, Caelum (2004). They Came From Within: A History of Canadian Horror Cinema. Arbeiter Ring Publishing.
