= Norman (TV series) =

1970 British TV sitcom

- Genre: Sitcom
- Written by: John T. Chapman; Ray Cooney
- Directed by: Alan Tarrant
- Starring: Norman Wisdom
- Composer: Jack Parnell
- Country of origin: United Kingdom
- Original language: English
- No. of series: 1
- No. of episodes: 6

Production
- Producer: Alan Tarrant
- Running time: 30 minutes
- Production company: Associated Television

Original release
- Network: ITV
- Release: 2 April – 7 May 1970

Norman is a British comedy television series that was originally broadcast on ITV in 1970. It starred Norman Wisdom as a man who quits his job with the Inland Revenue out of boredom to find a new more exciting life, but runs into chaos at whatever job he turns his hand to. All episodes are now believed to be lost.

It marked Wisdom's return to television after more than a decade as a film star. He followed it with two further ITV sitcoms Nobody Is Norman Wisdom (1973) and A Little Bit of Wisdom (1974–1976).

== Partial cast ==
- Norman Wisdom as Norman Wilkins
- Sally Bazely as Mrs. Tate
- David Lodge as Frank Baker

== Bibliography ==
- I.Q. Hunter & Laraine Porter. British Comedy Cinema. Routledge, 2012.
- Jon E. Lewis & Penny Stempel. Cult TV: The Comedies : the Ultimate Critical Guide. Pavilion, 1998.
