= A Sunday at the Pool in Kigali =

2000 novel by Montreal author Gil Courtemanche

- First edition (French)
- Author: Gil Courtemanche
- Original title: Un dimanche à la piscine à Kigali
- Translator: Patricia Claxton
- Published: 2000 (first French edition)
- Publisher: Les Éditions du Boréal, Montréal, 2000
- Media type: Book
- Awards: nominated for the Rogers Writers' Trust Fiction Prize, 2004
- ISBN: 0-676-97482-1

A Sunday at the Pool in Kigali (original French title: Un dimanche à la piscine à Kigali) is the first novel by Montreal author Gil Courtemanche, originally published in 2000.

Set in Kigali, Rwanda, the novel deals with a love affair between an elder Canadian expatriate and a young Rwandan, AIDS and the 1994 Rwandan genocide.

== Plot ==
Bernard Valcourt, a documentary filmmaker from Quebec, has been sent to the Rwandan capital Kigali to set up a television station. He falls in love with a Rwandan girl, Gentille, who in reality is an ethnic Hutu, but she is often mistaken for a Tutsi. With the Hutu government encouraging violence against Tutsis, Gentille's life becomes endangered. Encouraged by his love for Gentille, and a desire to complete a documentary to bring the tragedy of AIDS to the attention of the outside world, Valcourt refuses to leave Rwanda. When the two are married, they become separated, leaving Valcourt believing that Gentille has been killed. He then determines to document her life story, and sets out to discover the story of her final days.

== Recognition ==
The novel was translated into English as A Sunday at the Pool in Kigali by Patricia Claxton in 2003 (ISBN 0-676-97482-1). It was nominated for the Governor General's Literary Award for French to English translation.

Un dimanche à la piscine à Kigali was chosen for inclusion in the French version of Canada Reads, Le combat des livres, broadcast on Radio-Canada in 2004, where it was defended by writer, environmentalist and activist Laure Waridel. Un dimanche à la piscine à Kigali eventually won the contest.

A nomination for the Rogers Writers' Trust Fiction Prize 2004 was awarded to the book by Rogers Communications and the Writers' Trust of Canada.

== Movie ==
In 2006, a movie inspired by the book, A Sunday in Kigali (French Un dimanche à Kigali), was released.

== See also ==
- Hotel Rwanda
- Shake Hands With the Devil: The Failure of Humanity in Rwanda – book
- Shake Hands With the Devil: The Journey of Roméo Dallaire – documentary
- Shake Hands with the Devil – dramatic feature film
