= Geoffrey Stevens (journalist) =

Canadian journalist (1940–2023)

- Born: Thomas Geoffrey Stewart Stevens; January 30, 1940; London, Ontario, Canada
- Died: June 18, 2023 (aged 83); Cambridge, Ontario, Canada
- Education: University of Western Ontario
- Occupations: journalist, author, educator
- Years active: 1962–2023
- Spouses: Dannie Stevens (née Underhill); Lin Stevens (née Clarkson) (m. 1996; died 2018)
- Children: 5

Geoffrey Stevens (January 30, 1940 – June 18, 2023) was a Canadian journalist, author and educator.

== Biography ==
Geoffrey Stevens was born in London, Ontario, in 1940. In 1962, he graduated with honours from the University of Western Ontario, where he wrote articles for The Gazette, the student newspaper.

In 1962, after graduation, he was hired as a reporter for The Globe and Mail. In 1965, he was assigned to the Globe's parliamentary bureau in Ottawa. Impressed with his performance, the Globe reassigned Stevens to Paris, accompanied by his wife and son, so that he could become fluent in French. After his return, he became chief of The Globe's Queens Park bureau. Less than two years later, he left The Globe to write for the Canadian edition of Time magazine, but returned to The Globe in 1973 when offered a position to write a national op-ed column. In 1981, he left the column to prepare for a management appointment. To get to know other aspects of the news, he became Sports Editor. In 1983, he became managing editor for four years during which The Globe won three Michener Awards. In 1988, Norman Webster was removed as editor-in-chief and his colleague Stevens was soon after dismissed. Stevens sued for wrongful dismissal and received some compensation. In 1996, Bob Lewis, editor of Maclean's magazine, hired Stevens as its managing editor. However, when Lewis retired in 2001, the new editor dismissed Stevens to choose another person.

Stevens last lived in Cambridge, Ontario where he was a weekly columnist for The Record of Waterloo Region and the Guelph Mercury while also teaching political science courses at the University of Guelph and Wilfrid Laurier University. He also wrote for Canadian online media site rabble.ca. In June 2007, Stevens was awarded an honorary Doctor of Letters degree by Laurier for his "unique and outstanding lifelong contribution to political reporting and public discourse across Canada."

Stevens died of a heart attack in Cambridge, Ontario, on June 18, 2023, at the age of 83. His last column was published in the month of his death.

== Publications ==
Stevens authored six books on Canadian politics, but rose to greater national fame with his 2003 biography of noted Progressive Conservative organizer Dalton Camp, entitled, The Player: The Life and Times of Dalton Camp. Stevens was awarded the Drainie-Taylor Biography Prize by the Writers' Trust of Canada for The Player in 2004. His 2021 book is a biography of politician Flora MacDonald.

- Stanfield. Toronto: McClelland and Stewart, 1973.
- Leaders & Lesser Mortals: Backroom Politics in Canada (with John Laschinger). Toronto: Key Porter Books, 1992.
- No Holds Barred: My Life in Politics (with John Crosbie). Toronto: McClelland & Stewart, 1997.
- The Player: The Life and Times of Dalton Camp. Toronto: Key Porter Books, 2003.
- Campaign Confessions – Tales From the War Rooms of Politics (with John Laschinger), 2016.
- Flora – A Woman in a Man’s World (with Flora MacDonald), 2021.

== See also ==
- List of newspaper columnists
