= Sidney Ribaux =

Sidney Ribaux was the co-founder and executive director of Équiterre, a non-profit organisation based in Montreal, Quebec, Canada, promoting fair trade, energy conservation and ecological and socially just choices. Ribaux chaired the Board of Directors until 1998. He was then executive director until 2019 and was involved in the development of Équiterre's strategies and educational projects on fair trade, ecological agriculture, energy efficiency and sustainable transportation.

== Biography ==
From 1996 to 2003, Ribaux's passion for urban planning also led him to chair the Conseil régional de l’environnement de Montreal, a group of 100 organizations active in the field of urban ecology. He played an important role in the financial planning of public transportation in Quebec as well as in Canada's ratification of the Kyoto Protocol. While working for the consumer protection group Option consommateurs from 1992 to 1998, he helped set up an energy-efficiency program targeted to low-income families.

In 2007, he received a fellowship from Ashoka, an international organization that recognizes and supports social entrepreneurs. In 2009, he received the first Canadian Award for Environmental Innovation from the Royal Canadian Geographical Society. He is also an honorary fellow of the Royal Canadian Geographical Society.

Ribaux also spearheaded the Centre for Sustainable Development, which is one of the greenest buildings in Canada, as well as a hub for social and environmental groups. Over the years, he has been a member of the UQAM Institute of Environmental Sciences, the Green Communities Canada Association and the Québécois Action Fund for Sustainable Development. He has also authored many papers, reports, articles and documents on energy, transportation, responsible consumption and climate change. He is a frequent lecturer and is regularly interviewed by the media.

Today Ribaux heads the Office of Ecological Transition and Resilience at the City of Montreal whose mandate is to implement the city's ambitious climate plan.
