= Alphée of the Stars =

- Film poster
- French: Alphée des étoiles
- Directed by: Hugo Latulippe
- Written by: Hugo Latulippe
- Produced by: Éric De Gheldere; Hugo Latulippe; Colette Loumède
- Starring: Hugo Latulippe; Laure Waridel
- Cinematography: Philippe Lavalette
- Edited by: Annie Jean
- Music by: Alain Auger
- Production company: Esperamos Films
- Distributed by: National Film Board of Canada
- Release date: October 11, 2012 (FNCM)
- Running time: 83 minutes
- Country: Canada
- Language: French

Alphée of the Stars (French: Alphée des étoiles) is a Canadian documentary film, directed by Hugo Latulippe and released in 2012. The film documents a sabbatical year taken by Latulippe and his then-wife Laure Waridel in Switzerland, and its impact on their daughter Alphée, who has developmental disabilities caused by Smith–Lemli–Opitz syndrome.

== Awards ==
The film received a Canadian Screen Award nomination at the 1st Canadian Screen Awards, for Best Feature Length Documentary, and a Jutra Award nomination for Best Documentary Film at the 15th Jutra Awards.
