= The Investigator =

Radio play written by Reuben Ship

The Investigator (1954) was a radio play written by Communist Reuben Ship and first broadcast by the Canadian Broadcasting Corporation (CBC) on 30 May of that year. The play lampooned the actions of the U.S. House Committee on Un-American Activities (HUAC) and United States Senator Joseph McCarthy.

== Plot ==
A man who has been running hostile political investigations (clearly modeled on Joseph McCarthy, but not named), warned by a colleague that his latest planned political attack will go too far, responds, "Nothing can stop me!". But he is killed in a plane crash, and arrives at the Pearly Gates.

All who arrive there must be investigated to determine whether they should remain in Heaven (not referred to by that name) or be deported to Hell (also not named). The newly arrived man is contacted by a group of members of the committee that does those investigations (Torquemada and others), who tell him that the Gatekeeper, who chairs that committee, is too lenient, and that he, with his knowledge of "the latest inquisitorial techniques", is the person with whom they wish to replace the Gatekeeper, so that the committee can deport various people previously admitted whom they consider agents of "a foreign power". At the meeting which is supposed to determine whether he is to be admitted to Heaven, he and the others turn things around, and get the Gatekeeper dismissed, and him appointed as Gatekeeper, and hence chair of the committee.

He calls up many well-known people -- Socrates, Thomas Jefferson, John Milton, ..., Abraham Lincoln, ... -- and ends up deporting each of them "... from Up Here, to Down There." (The committee also summons various people named Karl Marx, but each describes himself as different from the author of the pamphlet handed to him: one is a watchmaker, one a piano tuner, one a pastry chef: so he declares that all persons named Karl Marx are to be deported.)

Finally, he states that he is going to summon someone guilty of "thousands of years of treason". That individual, "the Chief", arrives, and the Investigator goes crazy, mumbling "I am the Chief! I am the Chief!"

The next day, with arrangements in Heaven restored, the restored Gatekeeper assigns an assistant to bring the former Investigator "Down There". But Satan (who had shown up earlier, complaining to the Investigator that the people he was sending down were organizing rebellious activities against him) refuses to accept him, and points out that in such cases, the rules say that the person must be returned to the place of his departure from earth.

The Investigator is found wandering, out of his mind, at the base of the mountain at whose top the plane had crashed. A doctor tells a friend of the Investigator how incredible his survival of a crash that had killed everyone else on the plane, and his reaching the bottom of the mountain during the night, are. The friend replies, "It was an act of God, Doctor! An act of God!"

== Production ==
The play was produced in 1954 by the Canadian Broadcasting Corporation (CBC). A recording of the play exists with John Drainie, Barry Morse and James Doohan.
