= Équiterre =

Canadian non-profit organization

- Company type: NGO
- Industry: Agriculture management
- Founded: 1992, Montreal, Quebec, Canada
- Founder: Laure Waridel
- Headquarters: Montreal, Quebec, Canada
- Key people: Steven Guilbeault and Sidney Ribaux
- Revenue: 1,367,054 Canadian dollar (2003)
- Total assets: 282,570 Canadian dollar (2003)
- Number of employees: 29 (2003)
- Website: www.equiterre.org

Équiterre is a Canadian non-profit and non-governmental organization, operating in Quebec. It manages a community-supported agriculture system of farms and consumers, including households and institutions.

The non-profit's mission at founding had two main threads: to improve the organic agriculture economy in Quebec through stimulation of consumer demand, and to ensure access of citizens to local organic products through direct support of producing farms.

Members of the managed network required abiding by four criteria:

1. Members would pay in advance to farmers for produce, and farmers would make production for the network their highest priority.
2. The farmers would use organic farming methods.
3. The focus would be on local production-consumption.
4. The creation of a social relation between farmer and consumer.

== History ==
Équiterre was founded in 1993 by a group of young people including Steven Guilbeault, Laure Waridel, Sidney Ribaux, Patrick Henn, François Meloche and Beth Hunter who had participated in various preparatory conferences at the Earth Summit in Rio de Janeiro, Brazil, the previous year. This group shared the view that issues of poverty, the environment and North-South inequities must be considered in order for real change to occur in society. They decided to create an organization that would enable them to put their principles into action. Équiterre has since been devoted to implementing projects that focus on solutions rather than problems. The organization has grown thanks to the synergy of the many individuals who have joined its ranks.

Équiterre was incorporated as a non-profit organization in 1995 and was granted charitable status by Revenue Canada and Revenu Québec in 1996 (No. 894057132RR0001). In November 1998, "Équiterre" became the official name for Action for Solidarity, Equality, Environment and Development (A SEED).

Équiterre's first foray into community-supported agriculture (CSA) was with a farm in Mont St-Gregoire, Cadet-Roussel. The success of the first season with this farm led to the notion that management of a CSA network would be feasible.

One driver behind the formation of Équiterre was the consolidation and industrialization of agriculture in Quebec, which over the course of the twentieth century had reduced the number of farms from 200,000 down to 28,000, resulting in rural depopulation and economic depression.

In 2002, Équiterre started a program to connect its production network to daycare centers in Quebec to introduce locally grown food into the diets of young children. Along the same lines, the organization has piloted programs to provide hospitals and schools with organic produce produced by its CSA network as well.

== Scale ==
Équiterre operates its agriculture network solely in Quebec. In 1996, the organization's network consisted of seven farms and all deliveries were in Montreal. As of 2007, the organization's network consisted of 100 farms and 8,700 households. By 2014, the number of farms engaged remained at around 100.

== Activities ==
In addition to managing a community-supported agriculture (CSA) network, Équiterre engages in a number of additional activities. For instance, experienced farmers in the CSA network mentor beginning farmers, particularly in their first critical year. Far afield from agriculture, the organization is also certified to conduct energy audits for the Quebec and Canadian federal governments, and has a staff coordinator of energy-efficiency programs.

== Publications ==
- Hunter, Elizabeth (2000). Je cultive, tu manges, nous partageons: guide de l'agriculture soutenue par la communauté [I Grow, You Eat, We Share: Guide to CSA]. Équiterre.
