= Laure Waridel =

Canadian environmentalist (born 1973)

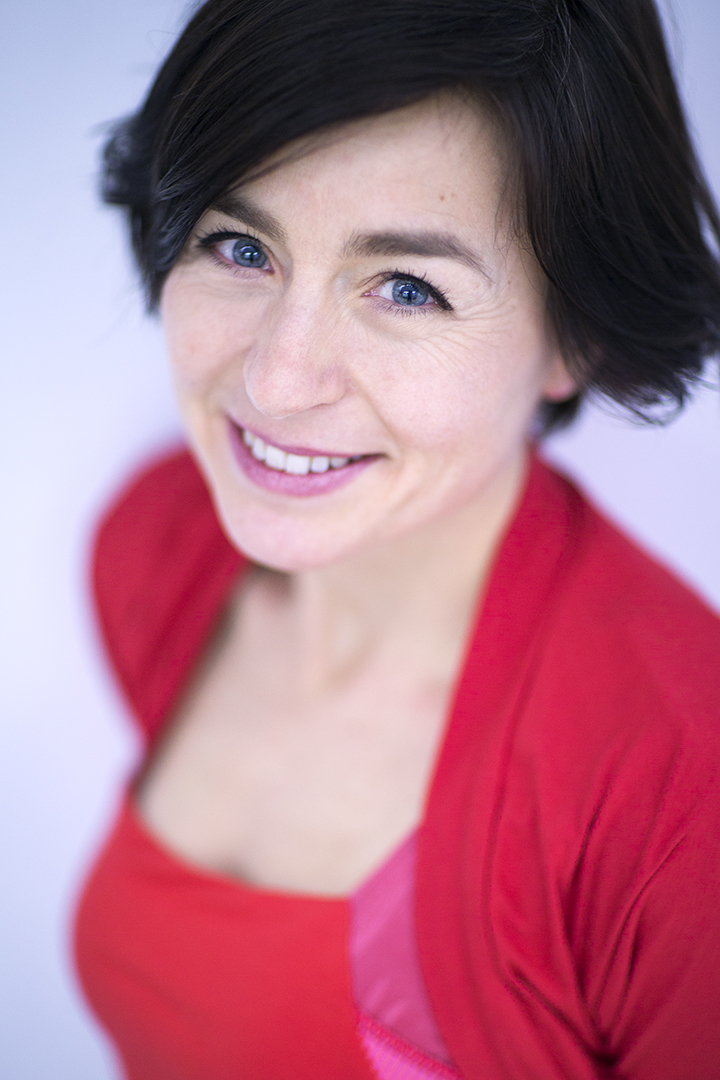
- Born: Laure Waridel; January 10, 1973 (age 53); Chesalles-sur-Oron, near Vevey, Switzerland
- Citizenship: Canada
- Education: Graduate Institute of International and Development Studies, McGill University, University of Victoria, Université du Québec à Montréal
- Known for: Her public activity, Bourse Laure Waridel
- Spouse: Bruce W. Johnston

Laure Waridel, CM (born January 10, 1973) is a social activist, a writer, an associate professor of environmental studies and sociology at the Université du Québec à Montréal, and a radio and TV commentator.

== Early years ==
Laure Waridel was born in Switzerland, in the village of Chesalles-sur-Oron just north of Lake Geneva in the Canton of Vaud. She has three sisters and a brother. When she was two, their new home was a dairy farm in Mont-Saint-Grégoire, Quebec, in the Montérégie region. It was not long before Laure became aware of the shift towards industrial farming methods and the vulnerability of farm producers. As a young girl, she worked at the Cadet Roussel organic farm in Mont-Saint-Grégoire, Quebec. She lives in Montreal and is the mother of two children, Colin and Alphée; Alphée was the subject of a 2012 documentary film, Alphée of the Stars (Alphée des étoiles), by her father and Waridel's then-spouse Hugo Latulippe. Waridel is now married to Bruce Johnston.

== Education ==
From 1990 to 1992, Waridel studied social sciences at the Cégep Lionel-Groulx. Subsequently, she earned a degree in sociology and international development from McGill University. She continued her university studies with a communications certificate from the Université du Québec à Montréal and a Master's degree in law and environmental studies from the University of Victoria in British Columbia. Waridel earned a doctorate degree at the Geneva-based Graduate Institute of International and Development Studies.

== Social activist ==
After the Earth Summit (1992) in Rio, Waridel became one of the founders of Équiterre, a non-profit organisation based in Montreal and dedicated to promoting ecological and socially responsible choices through action, education and research. It focuses on four issues: fair trade, ecological agriculture, energy efficiency, sustainable transportation, energy conservation, and ecological and socially just choices.

Laure Waridel was the president of Équiterre. Her collaborators are quick to say that Waridel's considerable charm and communication skills were instrumental in getting Equiterre off the ground and in the success of the fair trade. Waridel is no longer an employee of Equiterre, but continues as its most public representative. She remains with the non-profit organization today as a consultant.

In 2002, she was named by Maclean's Magazine as one of 25 Canadian personalities who are making a difference.

Waridel defended Gil Courtemanche's novel Un dimanche à la piscine à Kigali in the French version of Canada Reads, broadcast on Radio-Canada in 2004. This novel eventually won the competition.

In 2012, she was made a member of the Order of Canada "for her contributions as a writer, commentator and social activist on environmental issues, notably as co-founder of Équiterre". In 2016, she was made a Knight of the National Order of Quebec.

== Works ==
- L'envers de l'assiette (1998, 2003)
- Une cause café (1997)
- Coffee with Pleasure (2001)
- Acheter c'est voter (2005)
