= Claire Drainie Taylor =

Canadian actor and writer

- Born: Claire Drainie Wodlinger; September 11, 1917; Swift Current, Saskatchewan, Canada
- Died: November 18, 2009 (aged 92)
- Occupation: Writer
- Spouses: Jack Murray (m. 1933; div. 1938); John Drainie (m. 1942; died 1966); Nathan A. Taylor (m. 1968; died 2004)
- Children: Bronwyn, Kathryn, Michael, Jocelyn, Philip and David

Claire Drainie Taylor, née Wodlinger (September 11, 1917 – November 18, 2009) was a Canadian actor and writer, who wrote and acted in radio and television productions for CBC Radio from the 1930s through the 1960s.

== Early life ==
Born and raised in Swift Current, Saskatchewan.

== Career ==
For the CBC, Drainie Taylor acted in a number of radio and television productions, including Jake and the Kid, John and Judy and Barney Boomer; she also wrote radio plays, including Santa Had a Black, Black Beard and Flow Gently Sweet Limbo.

She published an autobiography, The Surprise of My Life, in 1998. Also that year, she created the Drainie-Taylor Biography Prize, a literary award presented by the Writers' Trust of Canada to the year's best biographical work by a Canadian writer.

== Personal life ==
Drainie Taylor was briefly married to Jack Murray as a teenager, moving with him to Vancouver Island before divorcing him at age 21. She subsequently met and married fellow actor John Drainie, with whom she had six children including journalist Bronwyn Drainie.

After John Drainie's death in 1966, she remarried in 1968 to theatre producer Nathan A. Taylor, who died in 2004.
