= Nicholas Wisdom =

English cricketer and businessman

Personal information
- Full name: Nicholas Wisdom
- Born: 18 March 1953 (age 73); Edmonton, Middlesex, England
- Batting: Right-handed
- Bowling: Right-arm medium

Domestic team information
- Years: Team
- 1974: Sussex

Career statistics
Competition	First-class
Matches	2
Runs scored	35
Batting average	35.00
100s/50s	–/–
Top score	31*
Balls bowled	83
Wickets	2
Bowling average	16.50
5 wickets in innings	–
10 wickets in match	–
Best bowling	1/0
Catches/stumpings	–/–
- Source: Cricinfo, 6 October 2010

Nicholas Wisdom (born 18 March 1953) is an English former cricketer, turned businessman. He was a right-handed batsman who bowled right-arm medium pace. The son of Sir Norman Wisdom, the comedian, singer-songwriter and actor, he was born in Edmonton, Middlesex.

Wisdom made two first-class appearances for Sussex in 1974, against Oxford University at Cricket Field Road Ground, Horsham, and Worcestershire in the County Championship at the Central Recreation Ground, Hastings. Against Oxford University he scored 31 not out in his only innings in the match, as well as taking the wickets of Peter Thackeray and Rick Lee, while against Worcestershire he scored 4 in his only innings of the match.

Following his brief cricket career, he opened a sports shop in Haywards Heath, Sussex.
