= Wisdom of a Fool =

2015 play by Jack Lane

- Original language: English
- Written by: Jack Lane
- Characters: Norman Wisdom
- Subject: The life of Norman Wisdom

Premiere
- Date: September 17, 2015

Wisdom of a Fool is a one-man play based on the early life and career of actor and comedian Norman Wisdom. The play premiered at The Capitol Theatre Horsham in September 2015, which coincided with Wisdom's centenary. This is the first play to be written on the entertainer which embarked on a UK tour from 2016 - 2018. Theatres include Yvonne Arnaud Theatre, Little Theatre (Leicester), Marina Theatre, Theatre Royal Margate, Gaiety Theatre, Isle of Man, Middlesbrough Theatre, Theatre Royal Bury St Edmunds, Courtyard, Hereford, White Rock Theatre, New Wolsey Theatre, Stockwell Playhouse, Jersey Arts Centre, Gala Theatre Durham, Broadway Theatre Letchworth, The Playhouse, Weston-super-Mare, Theatre Royal, Wakefield, Hazlitt Theatre, Theatre Royal Winchester, Devonshire Park Theatre, Queen's Theatre, Barnstaple, Falkirk Theatre, Hall for Cornwall, Customs House, South Shields EM Forster Theatre and Mercury Theatre, Colchester

The play is written by and stars Jack Lane as Norman Wisdom, with music and direction by Kenny Clayton and additional material by Martyn Bell. The Gump suit featured in the play was owned and worn by Norman himself, on loan to the production by Wisdom's estate.

The play received critical acclaim, five star reviews and played to standing ovations at every Theatre. The production was lauded for its sensitive and touching portrayal of Norman's life story and was praised by Norman's son and daughter, Nicholas and Jacqueline Wisdom who referred to the play as 'Moving' and 'Genius'
