= Bride (village) =

Coordinates: 54.38231°N 4.38876°W

Bride: Manx: Breeshey
- St Bridget's Church

- Location within the Isle of Man
- Parish: Bride
- Sheading: Ayre
- Crown dependency: Isle of Man
- Police: Isle of Man
- Fire: Isle of Man
- Ambulance: Isle of Man

Bride (Manx: Breeshey) or Kirk Bride is a village and the principal settlement in the parish of Bride in the north of the Isle of Man.

== Religion ==
The current St Bridget's Church, also known as Bride Church, was finished and consencrated in 1876 by Bishop George Selwyn. Its architect was Joseph Henry Christian (some sources claim Ewan Christian). The tower and rectory were gifted. The previous parish church, a "simple structure" 30 yards east of the current church and demolished in 1870, dated back to the 13th century. Some believe the original church was founded by St Bridget herself in the 6th century. The inside wall contains rare 13th-century Adam and Eve stone. A silver chalice was gifted in 1701, while a sundial was gifted in 1822. The church historically held a fair on St Bridget's Saint's Day.

Notable burials in the churchyard include Esther Nelson and Norman Wisdom.

Bride Methodist Church

The original Bride Wesleyan Methodist Chapel was built in 1793 for £120. There was also a Wesleyan Sunday School. Due to overcrowding, the chapel was rebuilt in the 1870s in the Gothic style by Robert Corkhill.

There was also Bride Primitive Methodist Chapel dated to 1843.

The Rectory in Bride is one of three rectories in the Isle of Man (the other two are in Ballaugh and Andreas).

== Education ==
A parochial school was founded in Bride in the mid 1870s. Bride School ceased operations in 2012 due to dwindling demand, and the remaining handful of pupils were transferred to Andreas Primary School. The school building subsequently became a privately operated nursery and pre-school.

== Amenities and development ==
View from the church

Plans were approved in 2011 for 24–27 new houses in Bride village.

Bride village has a park with an accessible play area at the bend of Lamb Hill and Cranstal Road. Across the street from St Bridget's Church is a teahouse called Bride Tea Rooms.
