= Trevor Herriot =

Canadian naturalist and writer

- Occupations: writer, naturalist
- Spouse: Karen Herriot
- Writing career
- Period: 2000s–present
- Notable works: River in a Dry Land: A Prairie Passage, Grass, Sky, Song: Promise and Peril in the World of Grassland Birds
- Notable awards: Cheryl and Henry Kloppenburg Award for Literary Excellence, Drainie-Taylor Biography Prize
- Website: trevorherriot.com

Trevor Herriot, SOM is a Canadian naturalist and writer; he is best known as a bird expert.

Herriot's work can be seen in major publications, including Canadian Geographic and The Globe & Mail. He has also written several books, and received many awards, including the Cheryl and Henry Kloppenburg Award for Literary Excellence.

Herriot regularly provides media commentary on the topics of nature and environmental issues. Such commentary includes a regular call-in segment on Blue Sky, a regional CBC Radio program in Saskatchewan.

== Personal life ==
Herriot lives in Regina, Saskatchewan.

== Recognition ==
=== Awards ===
In 2017, Herriot was awarded the Cheryl and Henry Kloppenburg Award for Literary Excellence, awarded for his body of acclaimed literary work.

Herriot's first book, River in a Dry Land: A Prairie Passage, won the following awards:

- Drainie-Taylor Biography Prize;
- the Canadian Booksellers Association's Libris Award for Best First-Time Author;
- the Saskatchewan Book of the Year Award; and
- the Regina Book Award.

River in a Dry Land: A Prairie Passage was shortlisted for the Governor General's Award for English-language non-fiction at the 2000 Governor General's Awards.

Herriot's second book, Grass, Sky, Song: Promise and Peril in the World of Grassland Birds, was shortlisted for the 2009 Governor General's Awards.

In 2022, Herriot was awarded the Saskatchewan Order of Merit.

== Media ==
Herriot has a media presence. He has been featured in news outlets, published books, and appeared on broadcasts.

=== News ===
Herriot has been featured on:

- National news outlets (e.g., CBC);
- Urban news outlets (e.g., Edmonton Journal); and
- Local news outlets.

=== Books ===
Herriot's writing frequently delves into the spiritual aspects of connecting with the natural world.

He has authored or co-authored the following books:

- 2000. River in a Dry Land: A Prairie Passage.
- 2009. Grass, Sky, Song: Promise and Peril in the World of Grassland Birds.
- 2011. Jacob's Wound: A Search for the Spirit of Wildness.
- 2014. The Road Is How: A Prairie Pilgrimage through Nature, Desire, and Soul. (apparently the same book is published under title The Road Is How : Three Days Afoot through Nature, Eros, and Soul (Patrick Crean Editions). At least the two books share the same author, ISBN 978-1-4434-1791-4 and most of the title.)
- 2016. Towards a Prairie Atonement by Trevor Herriot and afterword by Norman Fleury.
- 2017. Islands of Grass.
- 2021. Backyard Bird Feeding: A Saskatchewan Guide by Trevor Herriot and Myrna Pearman.
- 2025. The Economy of Sparrows: a novel.

==== Notable works ====
- Towards a Prairie Atonement received some coverage in the Regina Leader Post.
- Backyard Bird Feeding: A Saskatchewan Guide revived some coverage in The Western Producer, a local publication.

"Well-known writer and naturalist Trevor Herriot provided the Saskatchewan perspective to Myrna Pearman’s work. The combined knowledge, experience and talents of these two writers and bird lovers has resulted in a beautiful, engaging and informative handbook."

=== Broadcasts ===
- 2021. CBC Radio, Birdline with Trevor Herriot and Myrna Pearman.
