= W. B. Brydon =

British-American actor (1930–2024)

W.B. Brydon
- Born: William Brydon Bell; 20 September 1930; Newcastle upon Tyne, England
- Died: 8 November 2024 (aged 94); Palo Alto, California, U.S.
- Occupation: Actor
- Years active: 1972–2004

William Brydon Bell (20 September 1930 – 8 November 2024) was a British-born American actor, known for his appearances in Broadway and British-American films.

== Life and career ==
Brydon was primarily known as an actor, best known for the feature films The Age of Innocence (1993) and Trading Places (1983) and the television miniseries The Adams Chronicles (1976).

He provided the voice-over narration for many commercials, including ads for Oxy Skin Care products from the 1980s through the mid-1990s. His other voice work included ads for Raid insecticide, Fashion Bug clothing stores, Renault automobiles and the Shell MasterCard from Chemical Bank.

Brydon died on 8 November 2024, at the age of 94.

== Filmography ==
Year	Title	Role	Notes
1959	The Bloody Brood	Studs	
1961	The Mask	Anderson	
1976	The Adams Chronicles	Samuel Adams	TV Mini-Series, 6 episodes
1983	Trading Places	Bank Manager	
1993	The Age of Innocence	Mr. Urban Dagonet	
