= The Mask (1961 film) =

- Theatrical release poster
- Directed by: Julian Roffman
- Written by: Franklin Delessert; Sandy Haver; Frank Taubes; Slavko Vorkapich
- Produced by: Julian Roffman; Nat Taylor
- Starring: Paul Stevens; Claudette Nevins; Bill Walker
- Cinematography: Herbert S. Alpert
- Edited by: Stephen Timar
- Music by: Louis Applebaum
- Distributed by: International Film Distributions (Canada); Warner Bros. (international)
- Release date: October 27, 1961 (United States)
- Running time: 83 minutes
- Country: Canada
- Language: English
- Budget: $287,000-300,000
- Box office: $1.5 million

The Mask (re-released as Eyes of Hell and The Spooky Movie Show) is a 1961 Canadian surrealist horror film produced in 3-D by Warner Bros. It was directed by Julian Roffman and stars Paul Stevens, Claudette Nevins, and Bill Walker. It was written by Franklin Delessert, Sandy Haver, Frank Taubes and Slavko Vorkapich.

== Plot ==
The story concerns a psychiatrist, Dr. Allen Barnes, who obtains a mysterious ancient Aztec mask after one of his patients, Radin, commits suicide. Whenever he puts on the mask, Barnes experiences dream-like hallucinations that become increasingly disturbing and violent, eventually leading him to physically harm his girlfriend Pam. The horrific yet addictive visions begin to alter Barnes's personality and eventually drive him insane. Lt. Martin questions those who knew Barnes and the whereabouts of the mask.

== Cast ==
- Paul Stevens as Doctor Allan Barnes
- Claudette Nevins as Pam Albright
- Bill Walker as Lieutenant Martin
- Anne Collings as Miss Goodrich
- Martin Lavut as Michael Radin
- Leo Leyden as Doctor Soames
- Norman Ettlinger as Professor Quincey
- W. B. Brydon as Detective Bill Anderson
- Eleanor Beecroft as Mrs. Kelly
- Alfie Scopp as Taxi Driver

== Production ==
Julian Roffman, a documentary filmmaker who directed The March of Time newsreels, directed The Bloody Brood in 1959, with Nat Taylor as a partner. Frank Taubes and Sandy Haber, two New York advertisers, proposed to Roffman and Taylor, without a script, a 2D film with 3D sequences. Taubes and Haber produced test footage for the film, but Roffman was unimpressed and stated that their 3D effects were "crap". Taubes and Haber were given producer and writing credits, but their only contributions to the film was the idea for 3D effects.

Raymond Spottiswoode, a friend of Roffman, developed a 3D system called Depth Dimension while working for the United Kingdom National Research Council and The Mask was the first film to use it. The NRC created a 20-minute short using the system ten years prior, but had not reused it. The NRC rented the 3D cameras to Roffman and Taylor for £4,000 a week. Herbert Alpert was the cinematographer for the film and Charles Smith supervised the 3D cinematography. James Gordon, an optical effects worker for 20th Century Fox, was also hired. Herman Townsley, Skin Schwartz, and Dick Williams were hired for the practical effects.

Roffman stated that the idea for the film's plot came after he saw a museum exhibit on the Aztecs and modeled the mask in the film based on an Aztec mask. Joe and Vicky Morhain were hired to write a script, but had difficulty writing the dream sequences. Slavko Vorkapich, who had developed montage sequences for Mr. Smith Goes to Washington (1939), wrote the dream sequences. However, Vorkapich's ideas were too expensive and was working slowly. Vorkapich's ideas required tanks of black ink, thousands of frogs, and large amounts of mice. The Mask became his last screenwriting credit before his death.

The dream sequences were written by a collection of people including Herb Alpert, the film's cinematographer and brother of Harry Alpert; Gordon; Townsley; Schwartz; Williams; and Hugo Wuetrich. Wuetrich was a storyboard artist and drew many of the ideas, including ones that were not filmed such as a scene of giant spiders attacking the protagonist. The nightmare sequences in the film were inspired by Andreas Vesalius paintings that Roffman had seen.

The film was shot over the course of ten weeks in Toronto from 22 March to May 1961. The 14 minutes of 3D scenes were shot over eight weeks while the remainder of the film was shot in 16 days. The 3D scenes were shot in black and white, but were printed using colour film stock. $100,000 was budgeted for the 3D photography before the effects were added. The 3D scenes were shot first as they were more important according to Roffman. The sets used for the 3D scenes were built on wheels. Interior museum scenes were filmed in the Royal Ontario Museum while the Ontario Legislative Building was used for exterior scenes. The optical effects were completed by 20th Century Fox by August, and editing was completed by September. Myron Schaefer was meant to do the soundtrack, but died. Louis Applebaum wrote the film's score. The budget was between $287,000 (equivalent to $3,001,618 in 2025) and $300,000 (equivalent to $3,137,580 in 2025).

The film's distribution rights were offered to Warner Bros. Pictures and Paramount Pictures. Paramount offered $350,000 for the film, but Taylor chose Warner Bros. despite their lower offer, as he believed that they "were nicer guys". Paramount later offered Roffman a contract to make two more horror films, but he declined as he wanted to make more "serious" films. The film was initially 95 minutes long but was reduced to 83 minutes for its theatrical release.

== Release ==
The Mask was the first time that a film entirely produced by Canadians received wide international distribution. The film was distributed by International Film Distributions in Canada and by Warner Bros. Pictures internationally. The film was released in New York on 27 October 1961. The Mask was later changed to Eyes of Hell after the distribution contract with Warner Bros. ended. It earned $1.5 million during its initial release. New Line Cinema later distributed the film across college campuses in the 1970s. Roffman's son Peter stated that Warner Bros.' accounting prevented them from receiving profits from the film's American release. The film was later retitled to The Spooky Movie Show.

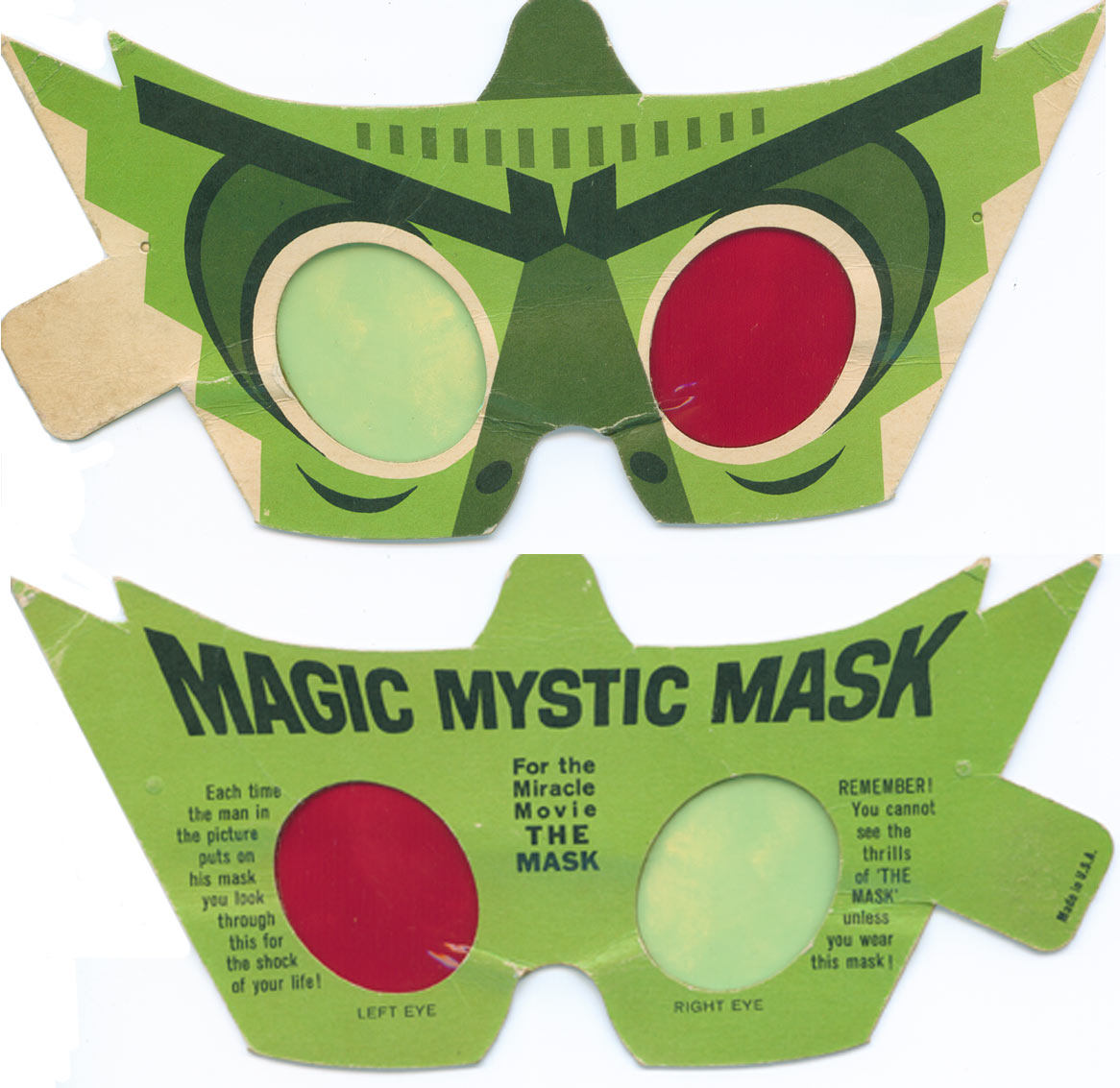
A "Magic Mystic Mask", showing both front and back, which was handed out to theatergoers to view the movie The Mask (1961).

Jim Moran, a mask collector, was used for the trailers. Specially made 3D glasses were given to audience members and prompts were shown on screen for the start of each sequence that used 3D.

The 3-D Video Corporation acquired the home media rights in the 1980s and intended to release it using anaglyph 3D, but went bankrupt before it could. Many bootleg versions were made, including one where Harry Blackstone Jr. narrated the 3D instruction video, before Rhino Video released the film in 1989, with the instructions narrated by Bob Burns III in his gorilla costume.

The film, restored by The 3-D Archive, premiered at the 2015 Toronto International Film Festival before being eventually released on DVD and Blu-ray.

== Reception and legacy ==
In a contemporary review, Howard Thompson of The New York Times commended the film's acting and cinematography but criticized the film's nightmare sequences, soundtrack and melodramatic plot. The Hollywood Reporter praised the film as "a superior horror film".

In retrospective reviews, Time Out panned the film, deeming it "a bland and hackneyed murder mystery that was spiced up by surreal nightmare sequences" and "tacky" use of 3D. Brad Wheeler of The Globe and Mail gave the film one out of four stars, similarly criticizing its 3D and plot and stating that its appeal was "limited to genre fetishists and popcorn-chomping ironists". Conversely, Chris Coffel of Bloody Disgusting felt that, despite a thin story, the film's psychedelic visuals, makeup effects and set pieces made it an enjoyable B-movie in the vein of William Castle.

The film has since gained a fan following over the years and is now considered a cult classic. The film was also featured in a season 13 episode of the cult science fiction series Mystery Science Theater 3000.

== Accolades ==
Award	Date of ceremony	Category	Recipient(s)	Result	Ref.
Berlin International Film Festival	18–29 February 1980	Best Special Effects in 3D	The Mask	Won	

== Works cited ==
- Bossen, Hye, ed. (1961). Film Weekly 1961-62 Year Book: Canadian Motion Picture Industry with Television Section. Film Publications of Canada.
- Hamilton, Craig (1991). "Canada's First 3-D Horror: The Mask". Filmfax. No. 25.
- Hart, Paul (1992). "The Mask". Propaganda.
- Kroon, Richard W. (March 30, 2010). A/V A to Z: An Encyclopedic Dictionary of Media, Entertainment and Other Audiovisual Terms. McFarland & Company. ISBN 978-0-7864-5740-3.
- Marchessault, Janine; Straw, Will (March 20, 2019). The Oxford Handbook of Canadian Cinema. Oxford University Press. ISBN 978-0-19-022911-5.
- Morris, Peter, ed. (1970). Canadian Feature Films: 1913-69 Part 1: 1913-40. Canadian Film Institute.
- Turner, D. John, ed. (1987). Canadian Feature Film Index: 1913-1985. Canadian Film Institute. ISBN 0660533642.
- Pichonsky, Jason; Kuebler, Monica (2011). "Put The Mask On Now!". Rue Morgue.
- Vatnsdal, Caelum (2004). They Came From Within: A History of Canadian Horror Cinema. Arbeiter Ring Publishing.
- "The Mask 3D". Kino Lorber. November 24, 2015.
