= François Ricard =

Canadian writer and academic (1947–2022)

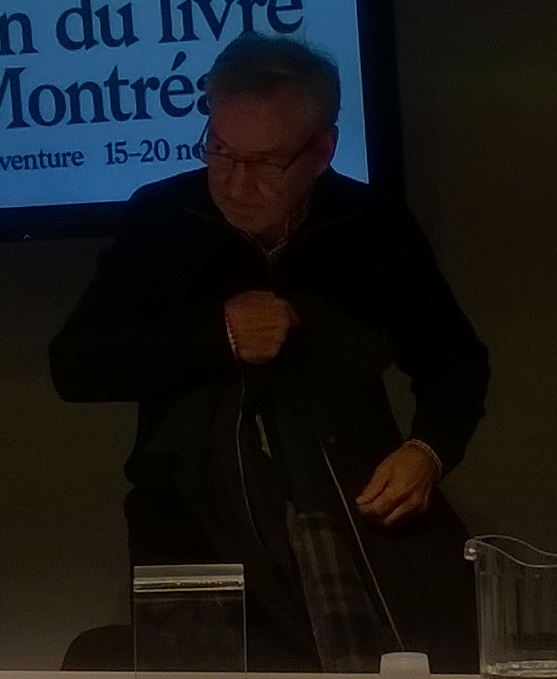
- Ricard in 2017
- Born: 4 June 1947; Shawinigan, Quebec, Canada
- Died: 17 February 2022 (aged 74); Montreal, Quebec, Canada
- Occupations: Writer, academic
- Writing career
- Notable works: La littérature contre elle-même, Gabrielle Roy, une vie
- Notable awards: Governor General's Award for French-language non-fiction Drainie-Taylor Biography Prize

François Ricard (4 June 1947 – 17 February 2022) was a Canadian writer and academic from Quebec. He was a professor of French literature at McGill University since 1980, including a special but not exclusive focus on the work of Milan Kundera and Gabrielle Roy, and has published numerous works of non-fiction.

== Biography ==
Born and raised in Shawinigan, Ricard was educated at McGill University and the University of Provence.

He was a founder of the literary journal Liberté, has served on the editorial boards of the publishing houses Éditions Sentier and Éditions du Boréal, and has contributed to both Radio-Canada and Télé-Québec as a literature reviewer and a host of documentary programming on Quebec literature and history.

Ricard died in Montreal on 17 February 2022, at the age of 74.

== Awards ==
He won the Governor General's Award for French-language non-fiction at the 1985 Governor General's Awards for La littérature contre elle-même, and Gabrielle Roy: A Life, an English translation by Patricia Claxton of his 1996 book Gabrielle Roy, une vie, won the 1999 Drainie-Taylor Biography Prize and the Governor General's Award for French to English translation at the 1999 Governor General's Awards. The original French edition of Gabrielle Roy, une vie was a shortlisted nominee for the Governor General's Award at the 1997 Governor General's Awards, and Le dernier après-midi d’Agnès: essai sur l’oeuvre de Milan Kundera was nominated at the 2003 Governor General's Awards.

== Works ==
- L'art de Félix-Antoine Savard dans « Menaud, maître-draveur », 1972
- Gabrielle Roy, 1972
- Une liaison parisienne, 1980
- Le Prince et la Ténèbre, 1980
- L'Incroyable odyssée, 1981
- La Littérature contre elle-même, 1985
- Guide de la littérature québécoise, 1988
- La Chasse-galerie et autres récits, 1989
- La Génération lyrique, 1992
  - English translation The Lyric Generation, 1994
- René Richard : 1895-1982, 1993
- Gabrielle Roy : une vie, 1996
  - English translation Gabrielle Roy: A Life, 1999
- Le Temps qui m'a manqué, 1997
- Le Pays de Bonheur d'occasion et autres récits autobiographiques épars et inédits
- Introduction à l'œuvre de Gabrielle Roy : 1945-1975, 2001
- (éd.) Gabrielle Roy, Mon cher grand fou, 2001
- Le Dernier Après-midi d'Agnès : essai sur l'œuvre de Milan Kundera, 2003
- Chroniques d'un temps loufoque, 2005
- Moeurs de province, 2014
