= Expresso (film) =

- Directed by: Kevin Powis
- Written by: Nigel Martin Davey
- Produced by: Kevin Powis and Nigel Martin Davey
- Starring: Norman Wisdom et al
- Edited by: Kevin Powis
- Release date: 2007
- Running time: 10 minutes
- Country: UK
- Language: English
- Budget: £8,500

Expresso is a 10-minute British comedy short film, produced by Nigel Martin Davey and Kevin Powis, and directed by Kevin Powis, Consisting of eight micro-films involving the characters that frequent one table during one day in a British coffee house. Former ELO drummer Bev Bevan has a cameo in the movie as a customer.

Funded by the UK Film Council and ScreenWM, it premiered at the Cannes Film Festival in May 2007, and later released on DVD to promote the World's Biggest Coffee Morning set up by Macmillan Cancer Support and raise money for the same charity.

== Tagline ==
One day, one table,

== Synopsis ==
Expresso is a series of eight micro-stories, that develop the viewer as they watch the visitors during one day, to one table in a typical UK coffee shop:

- "Autopilot" – a man taking breakfast with his wife (Don Warrington and Isabelle Warring), is more involved with his daily paper than the conversation that takes place around him, leading to an amusing crossing of wires.
- "The Liar" – a businessman (Vincent Franklin) who desperately wants to spend the afternoon with his plate of pastries, to the amazement of the waitress (Joanne McCallin), so resorts to blatant lies to achieve this.
- "Herbal Tea" – a couple (Guy Henry and Finty Williams) meet for coffee. But the lady who has opted for the healthy option, namely a "Herbal Tea", has her eyes on her partner's cream-topped drink.
- "Breakfast with DeNiro" – catch the conclusion of a typical lovers' tiff (Nigel Martin Davey and Ivania Elena)
- "Normal Coffee" – with echoes of Six Easy Pieces, sees a working man (Geoffrey Hughes) fighting the system in his own way to get his plain and simple drink against the advice of the pompous waiter (Lewis Harwood).
- "BUZZ" – a vicar with writer's block (Norman Wisdom) sits waiting for inspiration as he tries to write his next sermon, only to be targeted by a vicious vindictive fly.
- "Can I Help You?" – a young lady (Lucy Mans) is frustrated and struggling with a shrink-wrapped cake, when a man sitting opposite (Richard Ng) takes his chance to impress by offering to help open the wrapper. Things never work out how you expect!
- "End of the Day" – the last person to leave the café is an old lady who is obviously upset (Shirley Hall). The waiter has little sympathy, but the waitress takes the ultimate revenge.

== Production ==
The film was an idea of producer and actor Nigel Davey. Set in a coffee shop. He also told Kevin Powis about several other ideas that could take place in this setting, after which the decision was made to give other people the chance to collaborate. They put out a call for stories and quickly received over 150 submissions from which they chose the eight best entries which Powis worked into a screenplay they could use to request funding. The appointed script advisor from UK Film Council liked the script and the duo was given a budget of £8,500. Screen West Midlands also supported the film.

After funding was secured, Nigel Davey contacted actors and while negotiations were ongoing Powis tailored the script to the individual actors. Filmed in Bromsgrove, the cinematographer was Simon Wyndham, with the entire production process taking a year. Post-production saw Powis edit for eight hours at a time each day to hit the required deadlines. Still photography was done by Darren Seymour.

== Norman Wisdom ==
Sir Norman Wisdom came out of retirement at the age of 92 to participate in the film. Initially given a visual role so he wouldn't have to remember his lines, during filming he was alert and making people around him laugh, so Davey and Powis kept changing his performance to elicit more laughs. He recorded a message that was included on the DVD, in which he tells how much he enjoyed working on the film saying "every minute was worth an hour". The DVD also includes a foreword by Judi Dench. Wisdom's appearance in Expresso was officially his final acting role, as he died in a care home on the Isle of Man at the age of 95 on 4 October 2010.
