= Joel Yanofsky =

Canadian writer (1955–2020)

Joel Yanofsky (26 September 1955 – 23 December 2020) was a Canadian novelist and literary columnist.

Born in Montreal, Quebec, he grew up in the Laval suburb of Chomedey, where his parents had moved from the Montreal Jewish neighbourhood around St. Urbain Street.

Yanofsky's reviews and articles have appeared in The Village Voice, Canadian Geographic, Chatelaine, The Globe and Mail, The Toronto Star and The Montreal Gazette, among others. He earned the dubious honour of having once been ejected from the Ritz Carlton bar in Montreal in the company of John Updike.

He was also a journalism instructor at Concordia University.

His published works include Jacob's Ladder, Homo Erectus: And Other Popular Tales of True Romance, and Mordecai and Me: An Appreciation of a Kind. Mordecai and Me was a shortlisted nominee for the 2003 Drainie-Taylor Biography Prize.

His book, a memoir entitled Bad Animals: A Father’s Accidental Education in Autism, was inspired by the experiences with his autistic son Jonah.
