= Henry Kaplan =

American film director

- Born: September 13, 1926
- Died: 14 September 2005 (aged 79)
- Occupation: Television director

Henry Kaplan (September 13, 1926 – September 14, 2005) was an American television director known for his works on Dark Shadows, Ryan's Hope, The Doctors and All My Children. He also directed seven episodes of the sitcom The Adventures of Aggie. He owned the antique shop Sideshow in Manhattan.

Kaplan directed one film in his career, The Girl in the Boat, which starred Norman Wisdom and was a departure from the comedian's usual established persona.

Kaplan also for a time worked as a director with Granada Television based in London and was a director of some plays performed in the West End of London.

He died on September 14, 2005 at the age of 79.

== Selected filmography ==
- The Girl in the Boat (1961)
