= The Girl on the Boat (film) =

1962 film by Henry Kaplan

- Directed by: Henry Kaplan
- Written by: Reuben Ship
- Based on: the novel by P. G. Wodehouse
- Produced by: John Bryan
- Starring: Norman Wisdom; Millicent Martin; Richard Briers
- Cinematography: Denys N. Coop
- Edited by: Noreen Ackland
- Music by: Kenneth V. Jones
- Production company: Knightsbridge Films
- Distributed by: United Artists Corporation (UK)
- Release date: 5 August 1962 (UK)
- Running time: 90 minutes
- Country: United Kingdom
- Language: English

The Girl on the Boat is a 1962 British comedy film directed by Henry Kaplan and starring Norman Wisdom, Millicent Martin and Richard Briers. It is based on the 1922 novel of the same name by P. G. Wodehouse.

It was the second of a proposed three picture deal Wisdom had with United Artists but did so badly at the box office that the third film was cancelled.

== Plot ==
During the 1920s, two young men returning to England on a transatlantic liner fall in love with two fellow passengers.

== Cast ==
- Norman Wisdom as Sam Marlowe
- Millicent Martin as Billie Bennett
- Richard Briers as Eustace Hignett
- Philip Locke as Bream Mortimer
- Sheila Hancock as Jane
- Athene Seyler as Mrs Hignett
- Bernard Cribbins as Peters
- Noel Willman as Webster
- Reginald Beckwith as barman
- Timothy Bateson as purser
- Peter Bull as blacksmith
- Martin Wyldeck as J.P. Mortimer
- William Sherwood as Mr Bennett
- Georgina Cookson as passenger

== Critical reception ==
The Monthly Film Bulletin wrote: "Norman Wisdom here attempts something more reticent than his customary over-extrovert style. Despite the convincing enough twenties setting, the Wodehouse story, a few good moments, and a choice piece of character playing here and there, nothing about the film quite comes off. In fact, some might find the whole thing woefully unfunny. Wisdom is essentially an actor whom one either likes a great deal or not at all, but even his supporters might scratch their heads at this, and prefer the usual figure with the funny cap."

Sky Movies wrote: "Something of a departure for Norman Wisdom... Wisdom was not to stray from formula again until the conclusion of his string of crazy comedies for Rank".

The Radio Times commented: "Norman Wisdom tried something different from his usual slapstick with this seagoing comedy romance... It doesn't work for Wisdom, though it does for the less mannered professionals in support such as Richard Briers, Millicent Martin and Athene Seyler".

Allmovie wrote: "Like Jerry Lewis, Norman Wisdom is an acquired taste, but he's worth sampling at least once".
