= A Little Bit of Wisdom =

British TV series (1974–1976)

A Little Bit of Wisdom is a British television series which aired from 1974 to 1976. A comedy show, it was produced by Associated Television and starred Norman Wisdom. All 20 episodes are missing, and are believed to be lost.

== Cast ==
- Norman Wisdom as Norman
- Neil McCarthy as Alec Potter
- Frances White as Linda Clark
- Robert Keegan as Albert Clark
