= Bronwyn Drainie =

Canadian journalist (born 1945)

Bronwyn Drainie CM
- Born: 1945 (age 80–81); Toronto, Ontario, Canada
- Occupations: Radio host, columnist, book reviewer, editor

Bronwyn D. A. Drainie CM (born 1945) is a Canadian arts journalist. She was the editor-in-chief of the Literary Review of Canada from 2003 to 2015. She has also been a columnist and book reviewer for The Globe and Mail. Drainie served as a host of programming on CBC Radio, including the flagship program Sunday Morning. She is the daughter of actors John Drainie and Claire Drainie Taylor.

She was appointed as a Member of the Order of Canada in 2023.

== Books ==
- Drainie, Bronwyn (1988). Living the Part: John Drainie and the Dilemma of Canadian Stardom. Toronto: Macmillan of Canada. ISBN 0-77159918-8.
- Drainie, Bronwyn (1994). My Jerusalem: Secular Adventures in the Holy City. Toronto: Doubleday Canada. ISBN 0-38525474-1.
