= Norman Wisdom =

English actor, comedian and singer (1915–2010)

Sir Norman Wisdom OBE
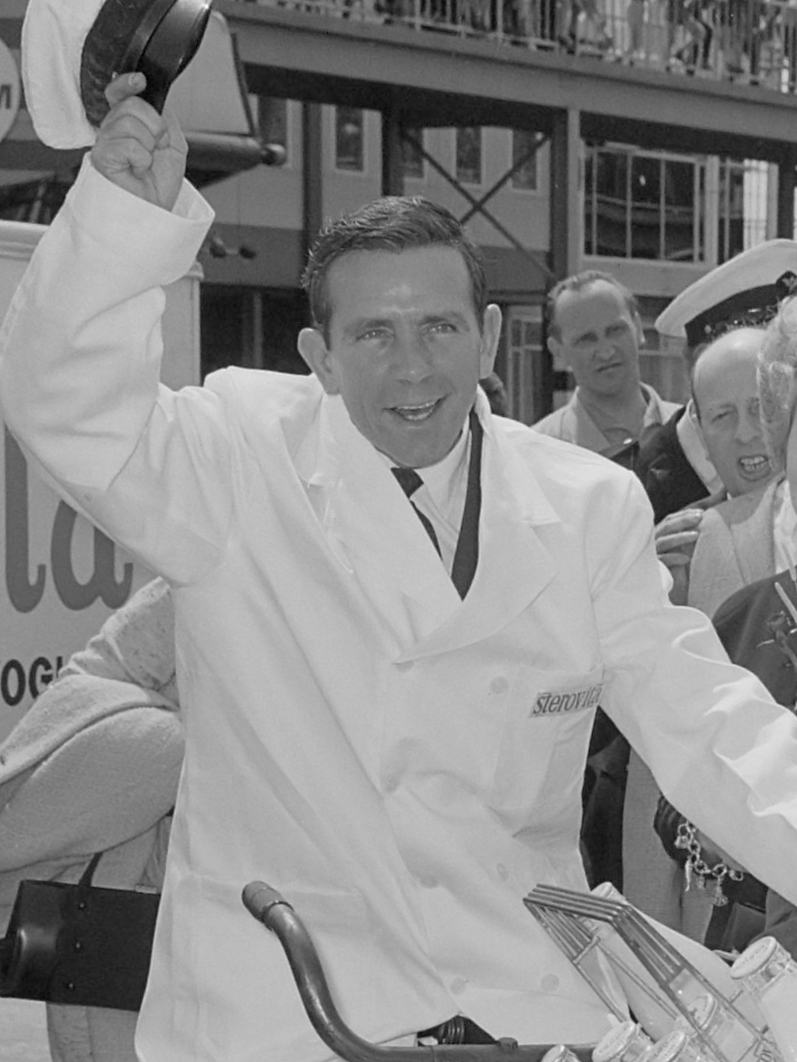
- Wisdom in 1965
- Born: Norman Joseph Wisdom; 4 February 1915; Marylebone, London, England
- Died: 4 October 2010 (aged 95); Ballasalla, Isle of Man
- Resting place: Kirk Bride Churchyard, Bride, Isle of Man
- Spouses: Doreen Naomi Brett (m. 1941; div. 1946) Freda Simpson (m. 1947; div. 1969)
- Children: 3, including Nicholas Wisdom

Comedy career
- Years active: 1946–2008
- Medium: Comedian; actor; singer
- Military career
- Allegiance: United Kingdom
- Branch: Merchant Navy; British Army
- Service years: 1930–1946
- Units: 10th Royal Hussars; Royal Corps of Signals
- Conflicts: Second World War

Sir Norman Joseph Wisdom (4 February 1915 – 4 October 2010) was an English actor, comedian, musician, and singer best known for his series of comedy films produced between 1953 and 1966, in which he portrayed the endearingly inept character Norman. He rose to fame with his first leading film role in Trouble in Store (1953), which earned him the BAFTA Award for Most Promising Newcomer to Leading Film Roles.

Wisdom's appeal extended far beyond the UK, gaining popularity in areas as diverse as South America, Iran, and many nations within the former Eastern Bloc. He enjoyed particular fame in Albania, where, during the dictatorship of Enver Hoxha, his films were among the few Western productions allowed to be shown. He was once described by Charlie Chaplin as his "favourite clown".

In later years, Wisdom broadened his career to include stage and television. He performed on Broadway in New York City alongside stars such as Mandy Patinkin, and won critical acclaim for his dramatic performance as a terminally ill cancer patient in the 1981 television play Going Gently. He also toured internationally, including performances in Australia and South Africa.

== Early life ==
Norman Joseph Wisdom was born on 4 February 1915 at the family home 91 Fernhead Road, Maida Vale W9, London. His parents were Frederick, a chauffeur, and Maud Wisdom (née Targett), a dressmaker who often worked for West End theatres and once made a dress for Queen Mary. The couple married in Marylebone on 15 July 1912. Norman had an elder brother, Frederick Thomas "Fred" Wisdom (13 December 1912 – 1 July 1971).

The family lived at 91 Fernhead Road, Maida Vale, London W9, where all four shared a single room. Norman and his brother grew up in extreme poverty and were frequently subjected to violence by their alcoholic father, who would sometimes pick them up and throw them across the room.

Following the separation of their parents, the boys were "farmed out to paid guardians", but their father failed to pay for their care, and they were eventually turned out. After being expelled from the home entirely by their father, Norman became homeless and was forced to sleep rough on the streets of London.

After a series of unsuccessful foster placements, he was eventually taken in by a generous couple. He soon found work as an errand boy in a grocer's shop, despite not initially knowing how to ride a bicycle. By the age of 13, he was working long shifts in a hotel. One of his fellow boy workers persuaded him to walk to Cardiff with hopes of becoming a miner. However, the boy’s family was unable to house him, and Norman found himself homeless again.

He later joined the Merchant Navy as a cabin boy, sailing to Argentina. During the voyage, he learned to box. In Argentina, he entered a prize fight, managing to last three rounds before being badly beaten. During his time in the Merchant Navy, he also had to fend off unwanted sexual advances from a fellow sailor.

Returning to Cardiff and once again out of work, Wisdom made his way back to London. There, he was advised to join the British Army, which accepted band recruits from the age of 14. Though he had no musical training, he tearfully persuaded the recruiting officer to let him join—and was accepted.

== Military service ==
In 1930, Wisdom was posted to Lucknow, in the United Provinces of British India, where he served as a band boy. During his time there, he learned to ride horses, became the flyweight boxing champion of the British Army in India, and taught himself to play a wide range of instruments, including the piano, trumpet, saxophone, flute, drums, bugle, and clarinet.

At the outbreak of the Second World War, Wisdom was assigned to a communications centre in a command bunker in London. There, he handled telephone connections between war leaders and the prime minister. He met Winston Churchill on several occasions while delivering updates on incoming calls. He later joined the Royal Corps of Signals, performing similar duties at unit headquarters in Cheltenham, Gloucestershire.

While shadow boxing in an army gym, Wisdom discovered his gift for entertaining. He began honing his skills as a musician and stage entertainer. In 1940, at the age of 25, during a NAAFI entertainment night, he spontaneously stepped out of the orchestra pit during a dance routine to perform shadow boxing. Hearing laughter from his fellow soldiers and officers, he added a duck waddle and a series of comic facial expressions. Reflecting on the moment, he recalled: "They were in hysterics. All the officers were falling about laughing."

Wisdom would later say that this was where he first developed his trademark persona as "The Successful Failure". Over the next few years, until his demobilisation in 1945, his act grew to include his now-famous singing, pratfalls, and stumbling routines. After a performance at a charity concert at Cheltenham Town Hall on 31 August 1944, actor Rex Harrison came backstage and encouraged him to pursue a career as a professional entertainer.

== Comic entertainer ==
After being demobilised, Wisdom worked as a private hire car driver. Having improved his diction during his army service, he also took a job as a night telephone operator.

At the age of 31, Wisdom made his debut as a professional entertainer, still referring to himself as "The Successful Failure". Performing in small suburban music halls, he crafted a unique act that drew on his natural shyness, his talent for slapstick falls, his musical versatility, and his singing ability. A recurring part of his routine involved struggling to keep up with a theatre band that frequently changed key—until he would outplay them, showcasing his virtuosity. A review from August 1946 praised his performance: "An unusual and most versatile comedian, Norman Wisdom, contributes two remarkable turns. He is an accomplished pianist, a pleasing singer, a talented instrumentalist, a clever mimer, and withal, a true humourist."

Wisdom's ascent in the entertainment world was relatively swift. A highly successful run at the London Casino in April 1948 led to a summer season in Out of the Blue in Scarborough. He shared the stage with magician David Nixon, and their onstage chemistry resulted in further variety performances together, beginning again at the London Casino in September 1948. That Christmas, he appeared in the pantomime Robinson Crusoe at Birmingham's Alexandra Theatre.

By this point, Wisdom had fully adopted the costume that would become his trademark: an askew tweed flat cap with the peak turned up, a suit at least two sizes too small, a crumpled collar, and a mangled tie. The comic persona that came with it—known as "the Gump"—would come to define his film career. Within two years, he had become a star of the West End theatre circuit, refining his act primarily between venues in London and Brighton:

I spent virtually all of those years on the road. You could keep incredibly busy just performing in pantomimes and revues. There was a whole generation of performers who learned everything on the stage.

In 1948, Wisdom made his television debut and quickly gained a large following. That same year, he appeared in a small film role in A Date with a Dream.

== Starring film roles for the Rank Organisation ==
Wisdom starred in a series of low-budget comedies produced by the Rank Organisation, beginning with Trouble in Store (1953). The film earned him a BAFTA Award for Most Promising Newcomer to Film in 1954, and became the second most popular film at the British box office that year. Exhibitors also ranked him as the tenth biggest box-office star in Britain in 1954.

His screen persona—lighthearted and physical—made his films natural successors to those of George Formby a generation earlier. While never critically acclaimed, Wisdom's comedies were considered popular with domestic audiences and represented some of Britain's most successful box-office draws of the era. They even found unexpected success in overseas markets, helping to financially sustain Rank at a time when its costlier productions faltered.

Most of these films featured his well-known Gump character—usually named Norman—who found himself in various manual jobs, frequently incompetent and always subordinate to a straight man, typically portrayed by Edward Chapman (as Mr Grimsdale) or Jerry Desmonde. The films highlighted Wisdom's flair for physical slapstick comedy and his ability to evoke sympathy through the character's naïveté and helplessness. Romantic subplots were a regular feature, often revolving around the Gump's awkwardness with women, echoing the innocence found in Formby's earlier roles.

Wisdom's second starring film, One Good Turn (1955), ranked as the seventh most popular British film of that year. He also appeared in As Long as They're Happy (1955), followed by a return to leading roles in Man of the Moment (1955), which further cemented his popularity—he was named the sixth most popular British film star of 1955.

His subsequent films saw him in a variety of jobs: a window cleaner in Up in the World (1956), and a jewellery store worker in Just My Luck (1957). Although these titles saw a dip in box-office returns, The Square Peg (1959), an army-themed comedy, reversed the trend, becoming one of the top-grossing films of the year and finishing seventh at the British box office. By contrast, Follow a Star (1959) was less successful.

Seeking to break from the Rank formula, There Was a Crooked Man (1960) marked an attempt to rebrand Wisdom's screen image, though The Bulldog Breed (1960) saw a return to more familiar territory. A young Michael Caine co-starred in the latter and later recounted that he did not enjoy working with Wisdom, saying he "wasn't very nice to support-part actors". Nevertheless, Wisdom retained his position as the tenth most popular star at the British box office.

Departing again from the typical format, Wisdom starred in The Girl on the Boat (1961), based on a novel by P. G. Wodehouse. He returned to more familiar comedic roles in On the Beat (1962), where he played a car cleaner, and in A Stitch in Time (1963), as an apprentice butcher.

His first colour film, The Early Bird (1965), cast him as a milkman. This was followed by a cameo in The Sandwich Man (1966) and a starring role in Press for Time (1966), his final film in the series of Rank Organisation comedies. Despite this being the end of that era, Wisdom was still voted the fifth most popular star at the British box office. FilmInk wrote that his film career was "a remarkable achievement for Rank".

In addition to acting, Wisdom's stage performances often included musical numbers, although he composed only a handful himself. He is credited with seven songs in the ASCAP database: "Beware", "Don't Laugh at Me ('cause I'm a Fool)", "Falling in Love", "Follow a Star", "I Love You", "Please Opportunity", and "Up in the World". His recording of "Don't Laugh at Me" reached number 3 in the UK singles chart in 1954, and another record by him, "The Wisdom of a Fool", made number 13 in 1957.

== Later career ==
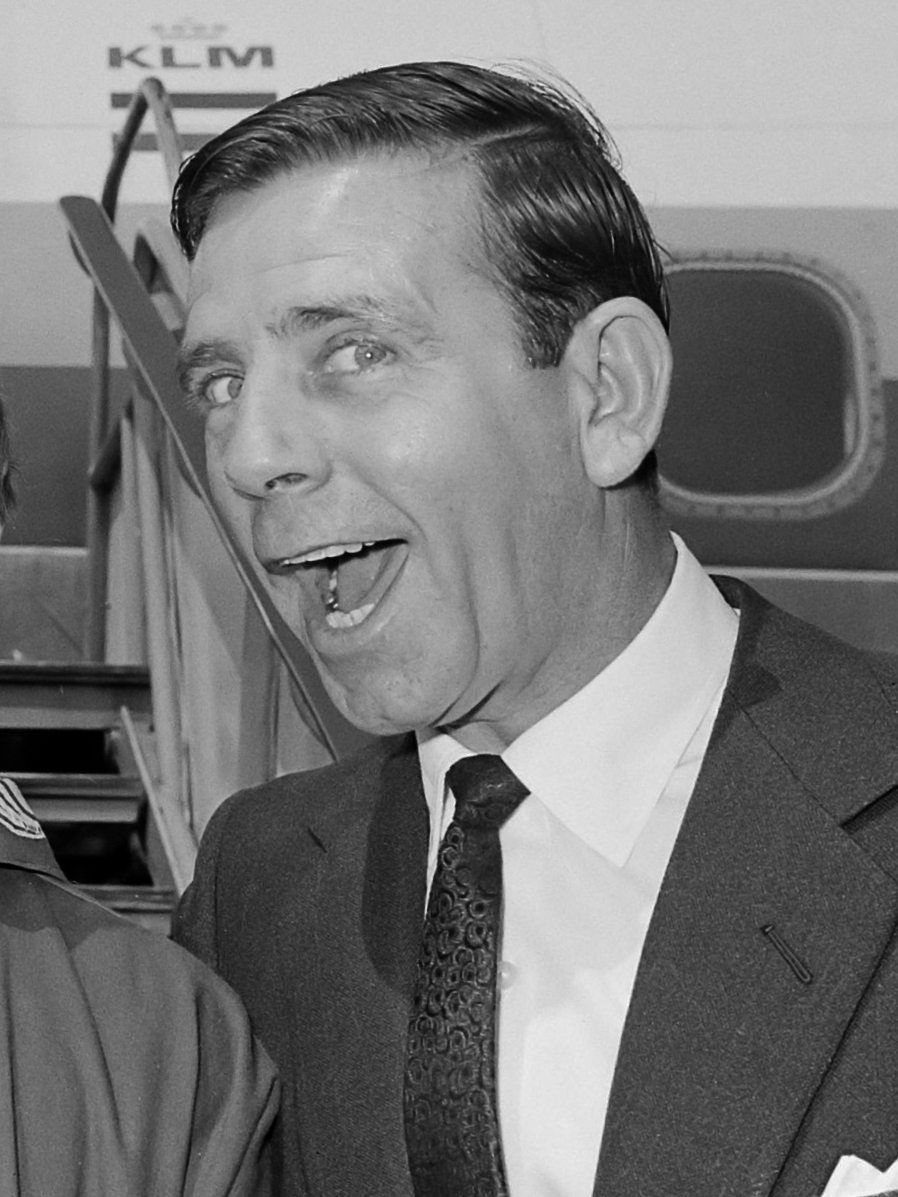
Norman Wisdom demonstrating a typical expression (1965)

In 1966, Norman Wisdom spent a brief period in the United States to star in the Broadway production of the Jimmy Van Heusen and Sammy Cahn musical comedy Walking Happy, based on Harold Brighouse's play Hobson's Choice. His performance as Will Mosop earned him a nomination at the Tony Awards.

This success led to his first Hollywood film role in The Night They Raided Minsky's (1968), as well as a part in the 1967 U.S. television musical adaptation of George Bernard Shaw's Androcles and the Lion, with music by Richard Rodgers and co-starring Noël Coward. He appeared on the soundtrack album as well, being highlighted alongside Ed Ames by a Billboard review.

Following a typically well-received appearance on The Ed Sullivan Show, further opportunities in the United States were cut short when he was forced to return to London after the breakdown of his second marriage. From then on, his career focused more on television, and he toured internationally with a successful cabaret act. In 1981, he received critical acclaim for his dramatic portrayal of a terminally ill cancer patient in the television play, Going Gently.

Wisdom was among the actors initially considered for the lead role of Frank Spencer in Some Mothers Do 'Ave 'Em. He declined the offer, reportedly because he "didn't find it funny", and the role was eventually played by Michael Crawford. Series creator Raymond Allen later confirmed this decision.

On 31 December 1976, Wisdom performed his theme song "Don't Laugh at Me ('cause I'm a Fool)" during BBC1's A Jubilee of Music, held to celebrate British pop music in honour of Queen Elizabeth II's forthcoming Silver Jubilee. He had previously performed for the Queen at many Royal Command Performances, beginning in 1952.

After touring South Africa, Zimbabwe and Australia with modest success, Wisdom's appearances in Britain became increasingly rare, and he spent much of the 1980s living in seclusion on the Isle of Man.

In the 1990s, his career experienced a revival, aided by the support of younger comedians such as Lee Evans, whose energetic performances were frequently compared to Wisdom's. This resurgence culminated in his being made a knight for services to entertainment in the 2000 New Year's Honours List. At the knighthood ceremony, he famously performed his trademark trip as he walked away from the Queen, prompting her to laugh warmly.

From 1995 to 2004, he played the recurring role of Billy Ingleton in the long-running BBC comedy series Last of the Summer Wine. In 1996, he was honoured with a Special Achievement Award from the London Film Critics.

Wisdom appeared on a special edition of This Is Your Life in 2000, dedicated to actor-director Todd Carty. In 2001, during an England World Cup qualifier against Albania, he made a memorable half-time appearance at St James' Park, scoring a penalty at the Leazes End.

In 2002, he filmed a cameo as a butler in a low-budget horror film, and in 2004 appeared in Coronation Street as fitness enthusiast Ernie Crabbe. In 2007, he came out of retirement to take a role in the short film Expresso.

=== Popularity in Albania ===
Wisdom became a beloved cultural icon in Albania, where his films were among the few Western imports permitted under the regime of Enver Hoxha. From the viewpoint of dialectical materialism, Wisdom's recurring screen persona—a proletarian underdog triumphing over the capitalist elite—was interpreted as a symbolic victory for the working class. His character, often referred to as Mr Pitkin, struck a chord with Albanian audiences.

When he visited the country in 1995, he was astonished to find himself mobbed by fans, including then-president Sali Berisha. During the trip, he was filmed by Newsnight visiting a children's project supported by ChildHope UK.

He returned in 2001, coinciding with the England vs Albania match in Tirana. At the training ground, he drew more attention than David Beckham and delighted the stadium crowd by wearing a half-English, half-Albanian shirt and performing one of his signature trips before kick-off. In recognition of his enduring popularity, Wisdom was made an honorary citizen of Tirana in 1995.

His affection for Albania culminated in a collaboration with Tony Hawks and Tim Rice on the novelty single "Big in Albania", featured in Hawks' book and TV series One Hit Wonderland. The song reached number 18 on the Top Albania Radio chart.

== Retirement ==
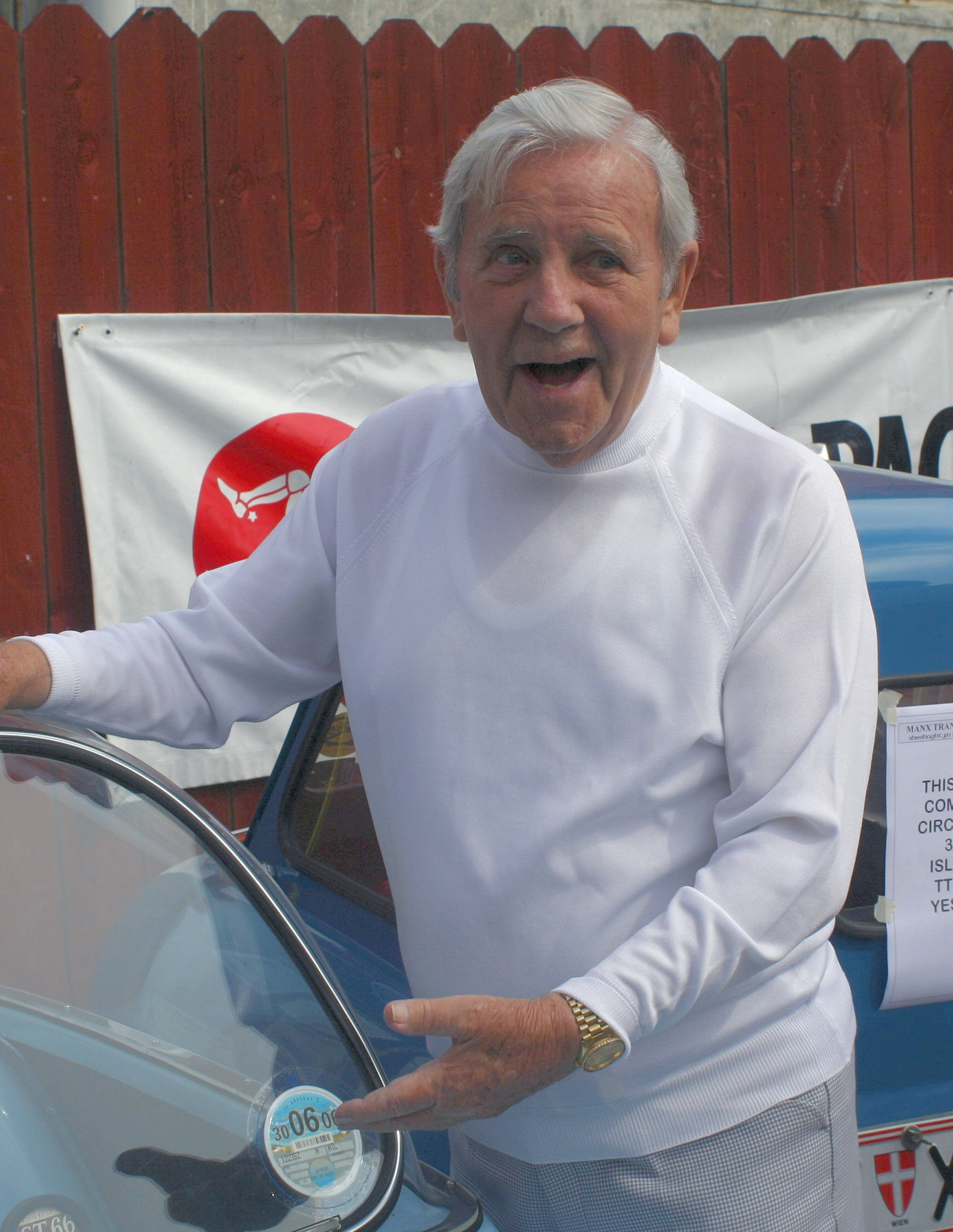
Wisdom in Peel, Isle of Man, in 2005

In October 2004, Norman Wisdom announced that he would retire from the entertainment industry on his 90th birthday, 4 February 2005. He stated that he intended to spend more time with his family, play golf, and enjoy driving around the Isle of Man, where he was living at the time.

Despite his retirement, Wisdom returned to acting in 2007 aged 92 with a role in the short film Expresso, directed by Kevin Powis. Set over the course of a single day in a coffee shop, the film was funded by the UK Film Council and ScreenWM. It was shot in January and premiered at the Cannes Film Festival on 27 May 2007. Wisdom later announced (as reported by BBC and ITV News) that this would be his final film role.

Expresso was subsequently adopted by the UK charity Macmillan and released on DVD to raise funds. In the film, Wisdom portrayed a vicar irritated by a fly in a café. Producer Nigel Martin Davey initially gave him a silent, visual role so he would not need to memorise any lines. However, on the day of filming, Wisdom was so engaged that his performance was expanded to include more comedic moments.

== Personal life ==
Wisdom was married twice. His first marriage was to Doreen Brett in 1941. By 1944, they had separated when Doreen gave birth to a son, Michael (born 1944), fathered by Albert Gerald Hardwick, a telephone engineer. The marriage was formally dissolved in 1946.

In 1947, Wisdom married Freda Isobel Simpson; together they had two children: Nicholas (born 1953), who later played first-class cricket for Sussex, and Jacqueline (born 1954). The couple divorced in 1969, and Wisdom was granted full custody of their children. Freda later died in Brighton in 1992.

He was appointed an Officer of the Order of the British Empire (OBE) in the 1995 Birthday Honours for services to entertainment and for charitable services, and was knighted in the 2000 New Year Honours for services to entertainment.

A well-known and well-loved resident of the Isle of Man, Wisdom lived for 27 years in a house in Andreas called Ballalaugh (Manx for "lake farm", and also a playful pun on the English phrase "belly laugh"). He was active in charitable causes, including support for orphanages in Albania. In 2005, he appeared in a music video for the Manx girl group Twisted Angels, for their single "LA", in support of the local charity Project 21.

In the 1960s, he was involved in a high-profile legal case, Wisdom v Chamberlain (1968), when the Inland Revenue pursued him for tax on profits from the sale of silver bullion, which he had bought out of concern over the devaluation of the pound. Wisdom argued that it was a personal investment, but the court ruled it was a trading venture, and therefore subject to income tax.

=== Interests ===
Wisdom was a lifelong supporter and former board member of Brighton & Hove Albion. He also had a fondness for Everton and Newcastle United. He enjoyed golf, and was a member of the Grand Order of Water Rats. He also held honorary membership in the Winkle Club, a charitable organization in Hastings, East Sussex.

An enthusiast of classic cars, Wisdom's collection included a 1956 Bentley S1 Continental R Type fastback, which he first acquired in 1961 and repurchased in the late 1980s. Following his divorce in 1969, he bought a Shelby Cobra 427, CSX3206, while in New York, and kept it until 1986, when he sold it to another car collector in Brighton. Until he failed a Department of Transport fitness-to-drive test due to age and mental health decline, he also drove a 1987 Rolls-Royce Silver Spirit and a Jaguar S-Type, both of which were sold in September 2005.

In 1963, he commissioned a new motor yacht. The 94 feet (29 m) hull and superstructure were constructed in Spain for £80,000, then brought to Shoreham-by-Sea, West Sussex, for fitting out. After three years of customisation and sea trials, the vessel—named M/Y Conquest—was valued at £1.25 million and made available for charter at £6,000 per month. Wisdom later sold it, admitting he was "no sailor".

== Health decline ==
In mid-2006, after experiencing an irregular heart rhythm, Wisdom was flown by helicopter to a hospital in Liverpool, where he was fitted with a heart pacemaker.

He moved into the Abbotswood nursing home in Ballasalla on 12 July 2007, where he remained until 4 October 2010.

That same month, following the DVD release of Expresso, the BBC reported that Wisdom was living in a care home due to vascular dementia. It was also revealed that he had granted power of attorney to his children and, after selling his flat in Epsom, Surrey, they were in the process of selling his Isle of Man home to help cover the costs of his long-term care.

On 16 January 2008, BBC2 aired a documentary titled Wonderland: The Secret Life Of Norman Wisdom Aged 92 and 3/4. The programme explored the challenges of caring for an elderly parent and showed that Wisdom's memory loss had progressed to the point where he no longer recognised himself in his own films.

== Death and funeral ==
In the final six months of his life, Wisdom experienced a series of strokes that led to a marked decline in his physical and cognitive health. He died on 4 October 2010 at Abbotswood nursing home on the Isle of Man, aged 95. His funeral took place on 22 October in Douglas, Isle of Man, with an open invitation extended to all island residents. His trademark cloth cap was placed on the coffin during the church service. The service was attended by many figures from the entertainment industry. At Wisdom's request, Moira Anderson performed "Who Can I Turn To", specially arranged for the occasion by Gordon Cree. He was buried at Kirk Bride Churchyard in Bride, Isle of Man.

== Tributes and other references ==
- In 2007, a Norman Wisdom-themed bar opened at the Sefton Hotel, Douglas, called Sir Norman's. It has stills from his many films on the walls and TV screens playing some clips of his old films. The bronze statue of Wisdom, which used to be on a bench outside Douglas Town Hall, has been moved to the steps leading into the hotel bar on Harris Promenade.
- Wisdom featured on the BBC Radio 4 series Desert Island Discs in August 2000. Of the eight songs he chose, four were performed by Wisdom himself (including his favourite, 'Don't Laugh at Me 'Cos I'm a Fool'), while a fifth was a duet with Joyce Grenfell.
- The 2011 film My Week with Marilyn features impersonator Glenn Michael Ford playing Norman Wisdom in a background scene.
- A Wetherspoon pub in Deal, Kent, where Wisdom ran away from the children's home, was named The Sir Norman Wisdom in his honour when it opened in March 2013.
- In 2015 Wisdom of a Fool, a new one-man play based on the life of Norman Wisdom opened at The Capitol Theatre, Horsham, in Wisdom's centenary year, on 17 September. A UK tour began at Guildford's Yvonne Arnaud Theatre in 2016 and continues into 2018.
- Wisdom is mentioned in the song "The Things That Dreams Are Made Of" by the Human League, while the gatefold sleeve of their Hysteria album shows the group in a large room with a scene from The Early Bird on the television.

== Filmography ==
Year	Film	Role	Director	Notes
1948	A Date with a Dream	Shadow Boxer	Dicky Leeman	
1953	Trouble in Store	Norman	John Paddy Carstairs	
1955	One Good Turn	Norman	John Paddy Carstairs	
1955	As Long as They're Happy	Norman – Cameo Appearance	John Paddy Carstairs	uncredited
1955	Man of the Moment	Norman	John Paddy Carstairs	
1956	Up in the World	Norman	John Paddy Carstairs	
1957	Just My Luck	Norman Hackett	John Paddy Carstairs	
1958	The Square Peg	Norman Pitkin / General Schreiber	John Paddy Carstairs	
1959	Follow a Star	Norman Truscott	Robert Asher	
1960	There Was a Crooked Man	Davy Cooper	Stuart Burge	
1960	The Bulldog Breed	Norman Puckle	Robert Asher	
1961	The Girl on the Boat	Sam Marlowe	Henry Kaplan	
1962	On the Beat	Norman Pitkin / Giulio Napolitani	Robert Asher	
1963	A Stitch in Time	Norman Pitkin	Robert Asher	
1965	The Early Bird	Norman Pitkin	Robert Asher	
1966	The Sandwich Man	Boxing Vicar	Robert Hartford-Davis	
1966	Press for Time	Norman Shields / Emily, his mother / Wilfred, his grandfather	Robert Asher	
1968	The Night They Raided Minsky's	Chick Williams	William Friedkin	USA
1969	What's Good for the Goose	Timothy Bartlett	Menahem Golan	
1992	Double X: The Name of the Game	Arthur Clutten		
1998	Where on Earth Is ... Katy Manning	Self		documentary
2001	Junfans Attic			
2004	Five Children and It	Nesbitt	John Stephenson	
2007	Expresso	The Vicar	Kevin Powis	Short; Buzz

== Television ==
Year	Title	Role	Director	Notes
1948-1950	Wit and Wisdom			
1967	Androcles and the Lion	Androcles	Joe Layton	TV special, musical comedy
1970	Norman	Norman Wilkins	Alan Tarrant	
1970	Music Hall			
1973	Nobody Is Norman Wisdom	Nobody		
1974	A Little Bit of Wisdom	Norman		
1981	BBC2 Playhouse	Bernard Flood		Episode: Going Gently. BAFTA Best Single Play, 1982
1983	Bergerac	Vincent		Episode: "Almost Like a Holiday"
1988	The 1950s: Music, Memories & Milestones			
1995-2004	Last of the Summer Wine	Billy Ingleton		7 episodes
1998	Casualty	Mr. Cole		Episode: "She Loved the Rain"
2002	Dalziel and Pascoe	Bernie Marks		Episode: "Mens Sana"
2003	The Last Detective	Lofty Brock		Episode: "Lofty"
2003	Between the Sheets	Maurice Hardy		Miniseries
2004	Coronation Street	Ernie Crabbe		1 episode
2008	Wonderland: The Secret Life Of Norman Wisdom Aged 92 and 3/4			

=== Box office ranking ===
For a number of years British exhibitors voted Wisdom one of the most popular stars in the country.

- 1954 – 10th most popular star (3rd most popular British star)
- 1955 – 6th most popular star (3rd most popular British star)
- 1956 – 5th biggest British star
- 1957 – 9th most popular star (5th most popular British star)
- 1958 – 7th most popular British star
- 1959 – 3rd most popular British star
- 1963 – 10th most popular star
- 1966 – 5th most popular star

== Audio recordings ==
- I Would Like to Put on Record
- Jingle Jangle
- The Very Best of Norman Wisdom
- Androcles and the Lion US Television, Original Cast Recording.
- Where's Charley? London Cast Recording.
- Wisdom of a Fool
- Nobody's Fool
- Follow a Star
- 1957 Original Chart Hits
- Walking Happy Original Broadway Cast Recording.
- The Night They Raided Minsky's Motion Picture Soundtrack recording.
- Follow a Star/Give Me a Night in June
- Happy Ending/The Wisdom of a Fool
- Big in Albania – One Hit Wonderland
- They Didn't Believe Me

== Books ==
- Wisdom, Norman (1980). "Contributor". David Jacob's Book of Celebrities' Jokes & Anecdotes. By Jacobs, David. Robson Books. p. 155. ISBN 0860511251.
- Lucky Little Devil: Norman Wisdom on the Island He's Made His Home (2004)
- Norman Wisdom, William Hall (2003). My Turn. Arrow Books. ISBN 978-0-09-944676-7.
- Don't Laugh at Me, Cos I'm a Fool (1992) (two volumes of autobiography)
- Trouble in Store (1991)
