= Patricia Claxton =

Canadian translator

Patricia Claxton (born 1929) is a Canadian translator, primarily of Quebec literature.

A native of Kingston, Ontario, Patricia Claxton spent most of her childhood in India. Upon returning to Canada, she has made Montreal, Quebec's largest city, and Canada's second-largest, her permanent residence. She attended the city's McGill University, where she received a Bachelor of Arts degree, and the Université de Montréal, where she earned a Master's degree in translation. She later taught translation at the Université de Montréal for eight years.

She was also founding President of the Literary Translators' Association of Canada and served on the board of the Ordre des traducteurs et interprètes agréés du Québec.

The literature of Gabrielle Roy has played a major role in Patricia Claxton's prominence in the field of translation. In 1987, she won her first Governor General's Award for French to English translation for her work on Roy's La Detresse et l'Enchantment, which she translated as Enchantment and Sorrow, and her second award, in 1999, was for translating François Ricard's biography of Roy. Her other notable translations include Un dimanche à la piscine à Kigali (A Sunday at the pool in Kigali), for which she was a finalist in the 2003 Governor General's Awards and shortlisted for the Rogers Writers' Trust Fiction Prize in 2004.

Authors she has translated include Nicole Brossard, Jacques Godbout, Jacques Hébert, Naïm Kattan, André Major, Fernand Ouellet, Gérard Pelletier, François Ricard, André Roy, Gabrielle Roy, France Théoret, Pierre-Elliott Trudeau and Marcel Trudel.
