= Nat Taylor =

Canadian film producer (1906–2004)

Nathan A. Taylor (1906 – February 29, 2004) was a Canadian inventor and film producer who co-founded Cineplex with Garth Drabinsky.

== Biography ==
Taylor was born and raised in a Jewish family in Toronto, Ontario and began his business career in 1918 selling postcards. He had 4 siblings: Fanny, Maish, Ida and Sylvia. At the age of 17, he was employed as local theatre manager while also earning a law degree from Osgoode Hall.

In 1934, he went into business for himself and founded 20th Century (Twinex) Theatres; by 1941, Twinex operated 17 theatres. He was then hired by Famous Players Canadian Corporation to operate an additional 25 theatres in addition to his own in order to keep him from linking up with their Canadian competition, Odeon. As head of Twentieth Century Theatres, the Ontario branch of Famous Players Canadian Corporation, he built one of the world's first cineplex movie theatres in Ottawa, Ontario at the Elgin Theatre. The Elgin's second screen opened in December 1947 on a patch of land adjacent to the original 1935 theatre. At first, the same program played in both auditoriums, but several years later Taylor came up with the idea of selling tickets to different movies from the same box office, laying claim as the first to do so. He also created one of the first movie theatres in a shopping mall (the dual-screen at Yorkdale Plaza in Toronto, Ontario, opened in 1964) and one of the first in an office building (another dual-screen, opened in 1962 in Place Ville Marie in Montreal, Quebec). By the 1970s, Taylor had entirely sold all but a few of his theatres to Famous Players, yet he started a new theatre chain from scratch, with Garth Drabinsky co-founding Cineplex Odeon cinemas. The first location in 1979 at the Toronto Eaton Centre had 18 screens (soon increased to 21), a Guinness World Record at the time.

He started the Canadian Film Weekly in 1941, edited by Hye Bossin. The magazine quickly became the key film trade paper in Canada, supplemented in 1951 with a yearbook for the Canadian film industry, and taking over the competing Canadian Moving Picture Digest in 1956. Taylor also distributed films, and produced of one of Canada's first horror movies The Mask. He was given a special Genie Award in 1984 for Outstanding Contributions to the Canadian Film Industry. In 1982, he received an honorary degree from York University after donating a movie theatre in his name to the school.

== Personal life ==
Taylor was married twice. His first wife, Yvonne, and son Michael, predeceased him. His second wife was Canadian arts figure Claire Drainie Taylor, with whom he had six stepchildren, Bronwyn, Kathryn, Michael, Jocelyn, Philip and David. He died from natural causes. Services were held at the Holy Blossom Temple in Toronto.
