= Reuben Ship =

Canadian playwright and screenwriter

- Born: 18 October 1915; Montreal, Quebec, Canada
- Died: 23 August 1975 (aged 59)
- Occupations: playwright, screenwriter

Reuben Ship (18 October 1915 – 23 August 1975) was a Canadian playwright and screenwriter. He is best known for his 1954 radio satire The Investigator, which lampooned the Army-McCarthy Hearings and the anti-communist paranoia of the Second Red Scare. Ship was a Canadian working in Hollywood who was named as a Communist and deported back to Canada. He found work in radio, advertising and film. He eventually moved to England, where he lived until he died.

== Biography ==
Reuben Ship was born in 1915 to Sam and Bella Davis Ship in Plateau Mt. Royal, a neighbourhood of Montreal with a high immigrant population. Despite an early illness that left him sickly throughout his life, he was able to complete his secondary education and attend McGill University in Montreal to study English literature. Upon his graduation in 1939, he began directing an amateur theatre company affiliated with the local YMHA and YWHA. Many of these plays were anti-fascist and were intended to raise money for the war effort. It was at this theatre group that Ship met his first wife, Ada Span.

Ship soon took control of another amateur theatre group known as the New Theatre Group, with Ada assisting him. Because this troupe typically put on leftist plays, they often found themselves under the surveillance of the "Red Squad" of the Québec Provincial Police. Ship's most successful effort during that time was We Beg To Differ, a musical revue with lyrics by Ship and music by Mel Tolkin which poked fun at numerous Canadian political figures of the time. By this time Ship had begun touring the northeastern United States, and he eventually settled in New York City. In 1944 he was hired by NBC as a scriptwriter for a new radio sitcom, The Life of Riley. When the show was adapted for television in 1949-50, however, Ship's contract had expired and he was not rehired.

== HUAC investigation ==
On July 31, 1951, Ship was informed by the U.S. Immigration and Naturalization Service that his immigration status was under review, likely because two fellow members of the Radio Writers' Guild had named him as a Communist. Called before the House Un-American Activities Committee on September 24 of that year, he pleaded the fifth four times and accused the Committee of jailing people who wanted peace. He was subsequently dismissed. Eighteen months later, on January 12, 1953, he was deported to his native Canada, where he settled in Toronto and got jobs at an advertising agency and writing radio programming for the CBC, including The Night Before Christmas and The Man Who Liked Christmas. both in 1953.

== The Investigator ==
On May 30, 1954, Ship's most important work, The Investigator, premiered. With the Army-McCarthy Hearings having been on television in America for two months, Joseph McCarthy's methods of investigating Communist infiltration in the U.S. Army fascinated the public, and were a topic for heated debate. Ship crafted a satire of this process, along with its ringleader, Joseph McCarthy. The Investigator concerns a U.S. senator who shares many of McCarthy's mannerisms dying in a plane crash and arriving at the gates of heaven, where a tribunal must decide whether he is bound for heaven or hell. The cunning senator commandeers the tribunal and promptly begins rooting out subversives from "up here" and sending them "down there," creating chaos among the residents of hell. Ultimately, in his hubris, he accuses God Himself of being a subversive, at which the Senator is banished to hell, where not even Satan himself will have him.

The Investigator proved to be tremendously popular, and bootleg copies began circulating throughout the United States and Canada. The BBC aired it in 1955, and the Australian Broadcasting Commission requested permission to air it as well. Despite this success, however, Ship decided to pursue his advertising career. In 1956 he moved to England.

== Career in England ==
Ship did not find great success in advertising, so he soon returned to scriptwriting. He contributed to episodes of the British show My Wife's Sister, and it is speculated that he provided scripts to American networks under a pseudonym as well. He scripted two films, There Was a Crooked Man and The Girl on the Boat. By this point, his marriage to Ada Span had failed, and in 1960 he married another Canadian television personality, Elaine Grand. He wrote many more radio programs throughout his career, and oversaw a stage production of his play The Taxman Cometh for the CBC in 1969. He lived in England until his death in 1975.
