= Writers' Trust of Canada =

Canadian nonprofit organization

- Founded: March 3, 1976; 50 years ago
- Founders: Margaret Atwood, Pierre Berton, Graeme Gibson, Margaret Laurence, and David Young
- Type: Charitable organization
- Registration no.: 119305076RR0001
- Location: 460 Richmond Street West, Suite 600 Toronto, ON M5V 1Y1
- Coordinates: 43°38′52″N 79°23′52″W
- Region served: Canada
- Key people: David Leonard, Executive Director; Marla Lehberg, Board Chair
- Website: writerstrust.com
- Formerly called: Writers' Development Trust

The Writers' Trust of Canada (French: La Société d'encouragement aux écrivains du Canada) is a registered charity which provides financial support to Canadian writers.

Founded by Margaret Atwood, Pierre Berton, Graeme Gibson, Margaret Laurence, and David Young; the Writers' Trust celebrates and rewards the talents and achievements of Canada's novelists, short story writers, poets, biographers, and other fiction and nonfiction writers through funding various awards, events and financial aid. It was registered as a charitable organization on March 3, 1976.

The organization funds and administers a number of Canadian literary awards; including the Atwood Gibson Writers' Trust Fiction Prize and the Hilary Weston Writers' Trust Prize for Nonfiction.

The organization funds programs and events to help emerging Canadian writers such as the annual Margaret Laurence Lecture, given by a noted Canadian writer; writers' residencies at Berton House in Dawson City, Yukon; and the Woodcock Fund, which provides emergency financial assistance to Canadian writers, named in memory of the Canadian poet George Woodcock. Annual fundraisers include the Writers' Trust Gala in Toronto and ‘Politics and the Pen’ in Ottawa. Money raised to finance the charitable activities of the Writers' Trust is drawn almost exclusively from the private sector.

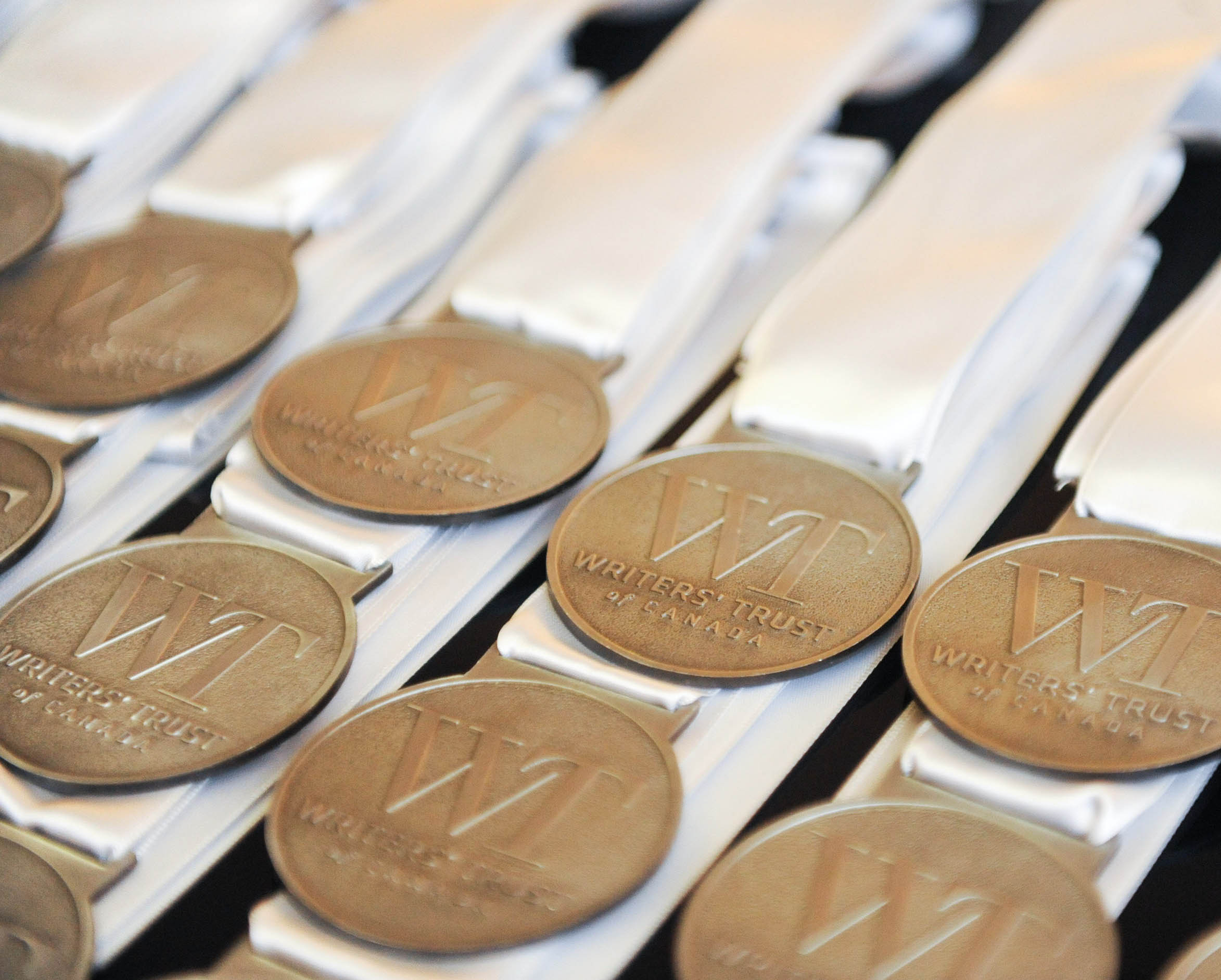
Writers' Trust Medals, given to invited authors at the 2011 Gala

== Management ==
The Writers' Trust of Canada is run by a board of directors composed of volunteers from the arts and business communities, and counseled by an Authors' Advisory Group composed of writers from across the country. Staff members see to the day-to-day operations out of a downtown Toronto office shared with the Writers' Union of Canada.

Juries are composed of writers based on recommendations by the Authors' Advisory Group; invitations are issued by the staff.

== Awards ==
Prize winners are announced at the annual Writers' Trust Awards with the following exceptions:

- The Shaughnessy Cohen Prize for Political Writing is handed out at Politics and the Pen in Ottawa.
- The RBC Bronwen Wallace Award for Emerging Writers winner is announced separately in the spring.
- The Weston International Award is announced in spring with a feature event each Autumn.

All awards are open to citizens and permanent residents of Canada. Winners are decided by an independent jury, usually consisting of three writers.

=== Shaughnessy Cohen Prize for Political Writing ===
The Shaughnessy Cohen Prize for Political Writing was established in honour of Shaughnessy Cohen (1948–1998), an outspoken and popular Member of Parliament from Windsor, Ontario; she died after suffering a cerebral hemorrhage in the House of Commons of Canada just seconds after standing to address her peers.

A prize of CA$25,000 is given annually to a book of literary nonfiction that captures a political subject of relevance to Canadian readers and has the potential to shape or influence thinking on contemporary Canadian political life. The winning work must combine compelling new insights with depth of research and significant literary merit. All finalist works should ideally demonstrate a distinctive voice, as well as a persuasive and compelling command of tone, narrative, style, and analysis. The prize particularly values books which provide the general reader with an informed, unique perspective on the practice of Canadian politics, its players, or its principles. The jurors shortlist between three and five titles. Prizes of CA$2,500 will be awarded to each of the finalists.

Past winners include Jane Jacobs for Dark Age Ahead and James Orbinski for An Imperfect Offering: Humanitarian Action in the Twenty-first Century.

=== RBC Bronwen Wallace Award for Emerging Writers ===
The RBC Bronwen Wallace Award for Emerging Writers was established by author Carolyn Smart and honours the memory of Bronwen Wallace (1945 - 1989), a Canadian poet and short story writer who died of cancer at the age of 44.

Two CA$10,000 awards are given each year to emerging writers of any age in the genres of short fiction and poetry. Two finalists in each category receive CA$2,500. Past winners include Michael Crummey and Alison Pick.

The Royal Bank of Canada Foundation sponsors the award as part of their RBC Emerging Artists Project, which works to support talented young adults in their development of professional careers in the arts. In 2008, the prize presentation was moved from the fall to the spring, creating the absence of 2007's award. In 2020, the age limit was removed, opening the award up to Canadian emerging writers of any age.

=== Hilary Weston Writers' Trust Prize for Nonfiction ===
Consisting of a CA$60,000 grand prize and CA$5,000 for each finalist, the Hilary Weston Writers' Trust Prize for Nonfiction is the most lucrative for Canadian nonfiction literature. The prize is awarded for literary excellence in the category of nonfiction, which includes, among other forms: personal or journalistic essays, memoirs, commentary, both social and political criticism, history, and biography. Finalist works should demonstrate, in the opinion of the jury, a distinctive voice, as well as a persuasive and compelling command of tone, narrative, style, and technique. The jury is free to interpret the definition of literary nonfiction as they see fit and finalist works are not required to encapsulate every aspect of the definition.

First established in 1997, the award's original corporate sponsor was Viacom. Pearson Canada, an educational book publishing company, took over the award in 1999, and Nereus Financial, a stock brokerage firm, became the sponsor from 2006 to 2008. From 2008 until 2011, the award had no corporate sponsor. In 2011, philanthropist and former Lieutenant Governor of Ontario, Hon. Hilary M. Weston, was announced as the award's new sponsor. Prior to Weston's patronage of the award, the prize was CA$15,000 for the winner and CA$2,000 for the finalists.

=== Atwood Gibson Writers' Trust Fiction Prize ===
The Atwood Gibson Writers' Trust Fiction Prize, worth CA$60,000, is awarded to the novel or short story collection that, in the opinion of the judges, is the year's best book of fiction. Prizes of CA$5,000 are also given to between three and five finalists. The winner, selected by a three-member, independent judging panel, is announced at the annual Writers' Trust Awards.

Formerly known as the Rogers Writers' Trust Fiction Prize, the award was renamed in January 2021 in honour of writer Margaret Atwood and her late husband Graeme Gibson. Rogers Communications sponsored the award from 1997-2019, when it was a CA$25,000 prize. Canadian businessman and philanthropist Jim Balsillie was announced as the new sponsor in 2021, bringing the top prize up to CA$60,000. Past prize winners include Alice Munro (2004), Lawrence Hill (2007), and David Chariandy (2017).

=== Writers' Trust Engel Findley Award ===
The Writers' Trust Engel Findley Award is given to a writer in mid-career for a body of work, and in anticipation of future contribution to Canadian literature. It was created in 2008 from two separate awards formerly known as the Marian Engel Award for female writers and the Timothy Findley Award for male writers. Marian Engel (1933–1985) was an award-winning Canadian novelist and passionate activist for the national and international writer's cause; Timothy Findley (1930–2002) was an influential Canadian novelist and playwright.

All Canadian and permanent resident writers in mid-career are considered and no age restrictions apply. For the purposes of this award, mid-career is defined as having published, in Canada, at least 3 books of literary merit which are predominantly fiction. The prize is worth CA$25,000; the winner is selected by a three-member, independent judging panel and announced annually at the Writers' Trust Awards. There is no submission process. Past winners include Miriam Toews and Nino Ricci.

=== Matt Cohen Award: In Celebration of a Writing Life ===
Matt Cohen (1942–1999), winner of the Governor General's Literary Award for Fiction in 1999, was a celebrated and prolific writer who died from lung cancer at the age of 56. The Matt Cohen Award: In Celebration of a Writing Life was established by a group of anonymous donors in his memory.

This CA$25,000 prize is presented annually to a Canadian or permanent resident whose life has been dedicated to writing, in honour of distinguished work in poetry or prose in either English or French. All Canadians and permanent residents dedicated to writing as a primary pursuit are considered. An independent jury selects the winner, and there is no submission process; the winner of the prize is announced at the annual Writers' Trust Awards. Past winners include Jean Little and Mavis Gallant.

=== Vicky Metcalf Award for Literature for Young People ===
Vicky Metcalf, a noted children's author and wife of George Cedric Metcalf, created this award in 1963 to stimulate the writing of literature for young Canadians. She held a passion for storytelling and published several children's books.

The Vicky Metcalf Award for Literature for Young People is worth CA$25,000 and is limited to works written by Canadian citizens or permanent residents. In contrast to other Writers' Trust literary prizes, qualifying authors published with a non-Canadian publisher are not excluded. An independent jury selects the winner and there is no submission process. The prize is announced annually at the Writers' Trust Awards. Past winners include Robert Munsch and Kenneth Oppel.

The award was known as the Vicky Metcalf Award for Children's Literature until a name change in 2013. It has been administered by the Writers' Trust since 2002 and was previously awarded by the Metcalf Foundation, which strives "to enhance the effectiveness of people and organizations working together to help Canadians imagine and build a just, healthy and creative society". The Metcalf Foundation continues to sponsor the annual award.

=== Writers' Trust McClelland and Stewart Journey Prize ===
The Writers' Trust McClelland & Stewart Journey Prize is made possible by James A. Michener's donation of his Canadian royalty earnings from his novel Journey, published by McClelland & Stewart in 1988.

The Journey Prize is a CA$10,000 award given annually to a new and developing writer of distinction for a short story published in a Canadian literary publication; there is no age restriction. The journal that published the winning entry also receives CA$2,000. A three-member, independent jury announces the winner at the annual Writers' Trust Awards. The longlist, chosen by the jury, is compiled each year to form the Journey Prize Stories anthology. Past winners include Timothy Taylor, Yann Martel, and Yasuko Thanh.

=== Dayne Ogilvie Prize for LGBTQ Emerging Writers ===
Originally established as a grant in 2007, the Dayne Ogilvie Prize was founded in memory of Dayne Ogilvie by his friend, Robin Pacific. Ogilvie was a freelance book editor, writer, and manager. He died in October 2006.

The CA$10,000 prize has been presented to a Canadian writer who is part of the LGBTQ community and demonstrates great promise through a body of work of exceptional quality. It is the only prize of its kind in Canada serving the LGBTQ community; any self-identifying writer is eligible. While no age restriction exists, the prize is intended for those who are still developing their writing career. To qualify, writers must have published at least one book of fiction. The winner is selected by a three-member, independent jury and announced annually during Toronto's Pride Week; there is no submission process. Past winners include Nancy Jo Cullen and Farzana Doctor.

=== Latner Writers' Trust Poetry Prize ===
Created in 2014 in conjunction with the Latner Family Foundation, the Latner Writers' Trust Poetry Prize presents $25,000 to a Canadian poet who has published at least three collections of poetry, to honour their body of work.

=== Balsillie Prize for Public Policy ===
Endowed by former Research in Motion CEO Jim Balsillie, the CA$60,000 Balsillie Prize for Public Policy honours Canadian writing on public policy matters, and was presented for the first time in 2021.

=== Andrew Pyper Award ===
First awarded in 2026 in memory of writer Andrew Pyper following his death in 2025, the Andrew Pyper Award honours works in speculative fiction genres such as horror, thriller or science fiction. The inaugural prize, worth CA$20,000, was award to Nalo Hopkinson.

== Defunct awards ==
=== Drainie-Taylor Biography Prize ===
Beginning in 1999, the organization presented the Drainie-Taylor Biography Prize to a book judged as the year's best work of biography, autobiography or memoir. Endowed by actor and writer Claire Drainie Taylor, the award was discontinued in 2006 after a reorganization of the awards program.

=== Gordon Montador Award ===
The Gordon Montador Award was presented for nonfiction work from 1993 to 1999, when it was superseded by a reorganization of the nonfiction awards.

== Programs ==
=== Woodcock Fund ===
Established in 1989 by George Woodcock and his wife Ingeborg, the Woodcock Fund provides emergency funding to professional Canadian writers mid-project who are facing an unforeseen financial need that threatens the completion of their book, and who lack the resources to meet that situation. Each financial grant is given as one time assistance for a specific emergency. (The program does not consider requests for chronic situations or project funding; nor can it consider situations resulting from general indebtedness or unemployment.) All applications to the Fund are processed in confidence. Successful applicants are urged to acknowledge their grants in their books.

From 1989-2020, the Woodcock Fund have CA$1,400,000 to 250 writers.

=== Berton House Writers' Retreat ===
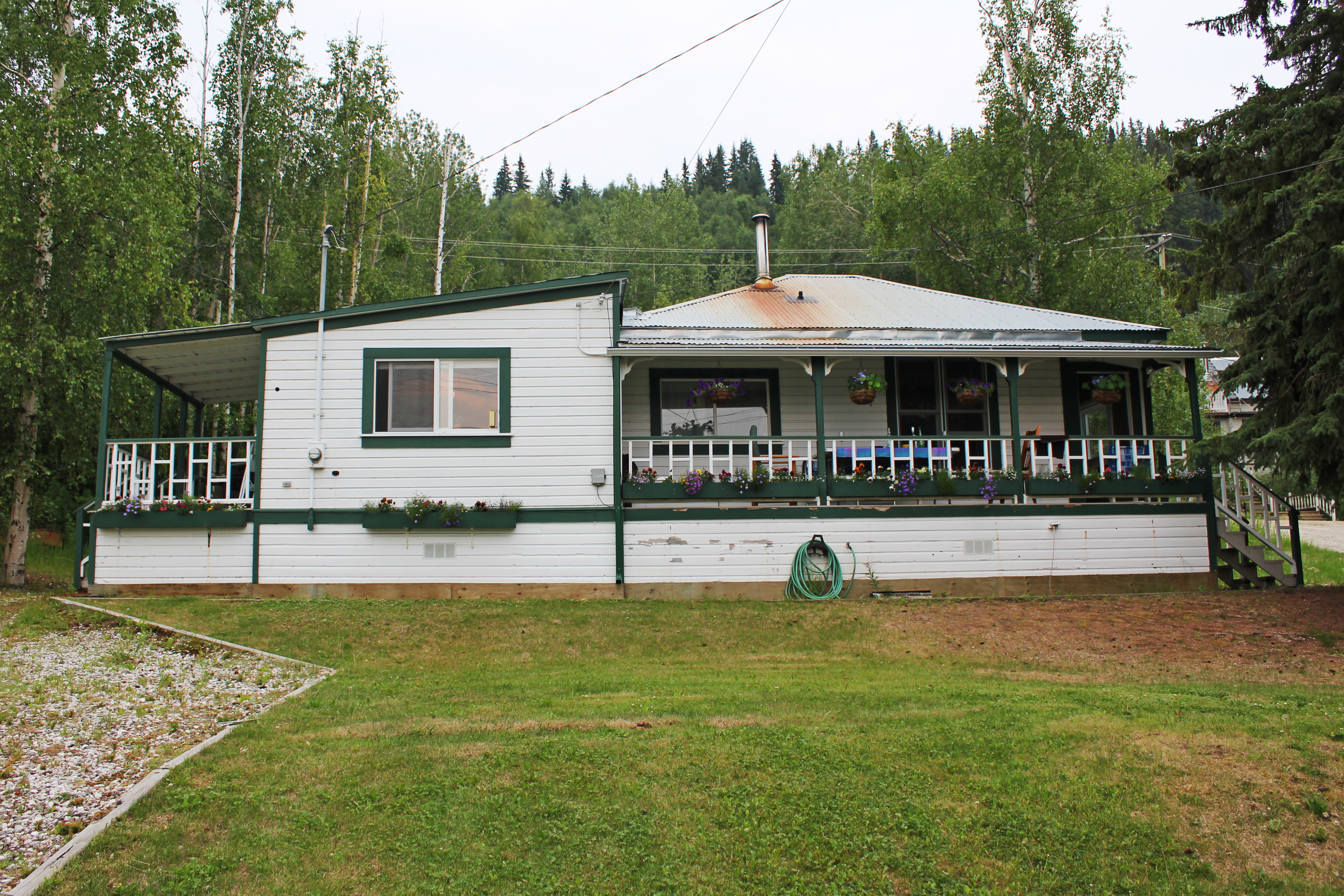
Summer 2014 at Berton House

The Berton House Writers' Retreat provides a unique opportunity for 4 professional Canadian creative writers each year to work in a remote northern community for 3 months each. The writer is housed in a two-bedroom bungalow in Dawson City, Yukon, the boyhood home of author Pierre Berton. Additionally, a CA$6,000 honorarium is provided to allow the author to focus in the remote setting. Over 80 authors have been invited to participate in the program since its inception in 1996, including Pasha Malla, Charlotte Gray, and Chris Turner. In the fall of 2006, HGTV's Designer Guys gave the bungalow an update on their popular interior design show.

=== Margaret Laurence Lecture ===
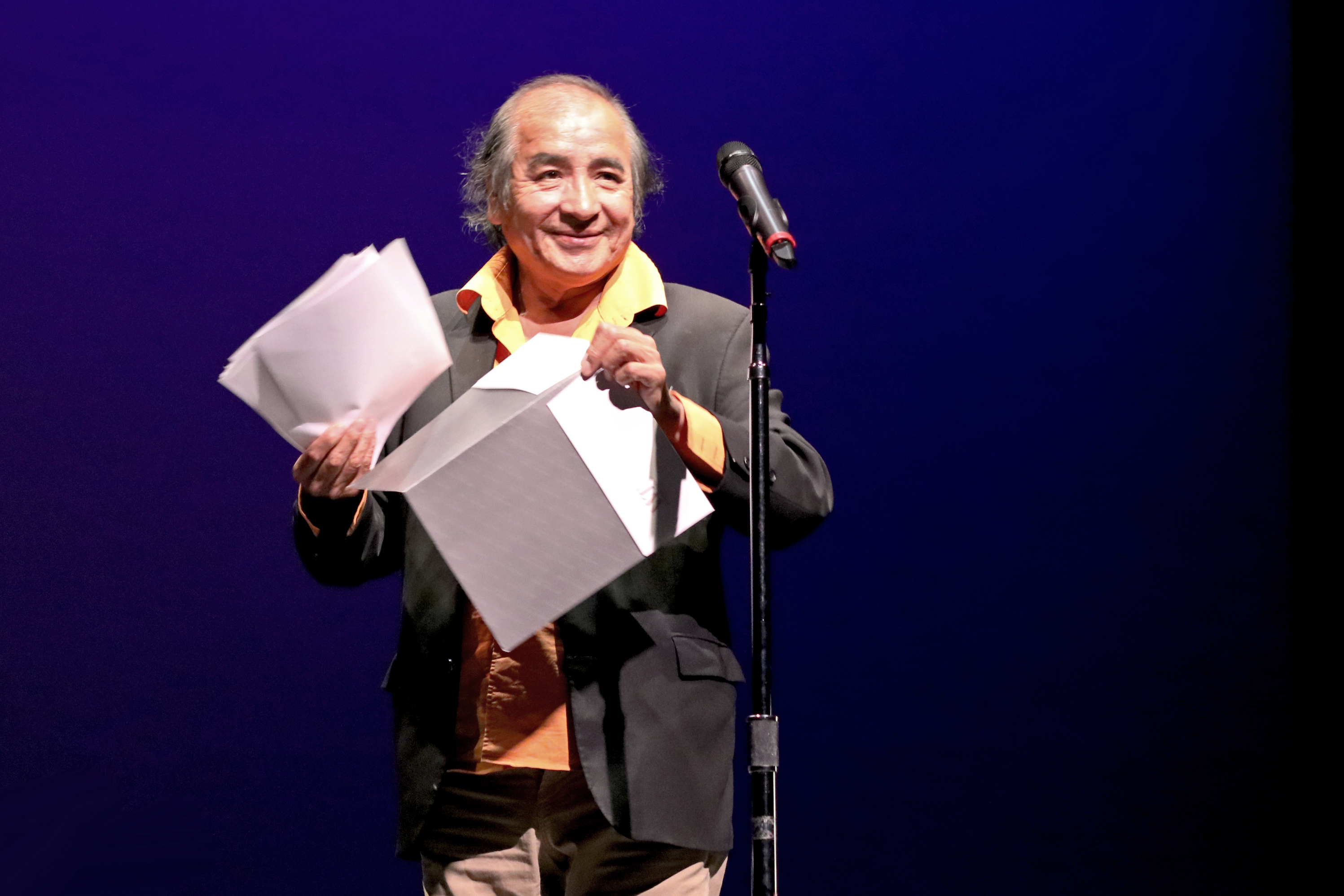
Tomson Highway delivers the 2018 Margaret Laurence Lecture in Toronto

The Margaret Laurence Lecture series was created in honour of Margaret Laurence (1926–1987), a celebrated novelist and short story writer. The annual lecture series has invited some of Canada's most prominent authors to discuss the theme of "A Writer's Life" in front of their peers since 1987. Notable names such as Dionne Brand, Tomson Highway, Olive Senior, Hugh MacLennan, Mavis Gallant, Timothy Findley, W. O. Mitchell, Pierre Berton, P. K. Page, Dorothy Livesay, Alistair MacLeod, and Margaret Atwood, among others, have shared the personal challenges they faced in forging their own paths as writers. Approximately 45 minutes in length, the lectures are meant to provide a unique account of a period when a national writing community was just being formed. The series offers insight into the work of Canadian literature's heroes and heroines, the profession of writing as a whole, and Canada's unique cultural history. The Writers' Trust provides a CA$5,000 honorarium to each speaker; an anthology of the lecture series was published in May 2011 by McClelland & Stewart to coincide with the 25th anniversary lecture.

=== Writers' Trust Mentorship ===
The Writers’ Trust Mentorship program provides guidance through one-on-one instruction to a developing writer from an established writer. Three mentors are selected by the Writers’ Trust, each working in one of the fields of fiction, poetry, and literary nonfiction. Mentor select one mentee from a pool of applicants to work with over a 5-month period. Mentees receive CA$2,500.

=== Rising Stars ===
The Writers’ Trust Rising Stars program is a career development program. Authors in the early stages of their careers receive $5,000 and an endorsement from an influential Canadian author. Five notable Canadian writers each select one developing writer with potential. Through a mentorship component, selectors offer recipients feedback and advice. Rising Stars attend a series of professional and networking events and are invited to attend a two-week self-directed writing residency at the Banff Centre for Arts and Creativity.

=== Fellowship ===
The WT Fellowship rewards one writer $50,000 for demonstrating exceptional creative ability and outstanding promise in their publications to date. The Fellowship is meant to provide recipients a window in which they can work on their next book with as much creative freedom as possible. Fellows are invited to attend a two-week, self-directed residency at the Leighton Artists’ Colony at The Banff Centre in Alberta. Writers who have a strong publishing track record in the categories of fiction, literary nonfiction, poetry, or literature for young people are eligible.

== Events and fundraisers ==
=== Politics and the Pen ===
The Politics and the Pen gala is a celebration of Canadian political and literary cultures run by an external committee, with Writers' Trust of Canada as its beneficiary. Held in Ottawa at the Fairmont Château Laurier, the event brings together national politicians, writers, diplomats, and leaders of the arts and business communities. The climax of the evening is the presentation of the CA$25,000 Shaughnessy Cohen Prize for Political Writing, sponsored by CN. The event is popular among politicians and their friends; waiting lists for table sponsorships and individual tickets are common.

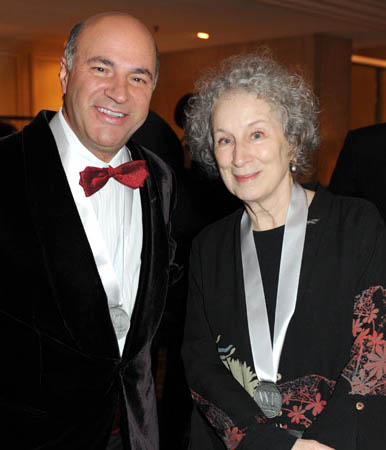
Authors Kevin O'Leary and Margaret Atwood at the 2011 Writers' Trust Gala

=== Writers' Trust Gala ===
The annual Writers' Trust Gala brings leaders of the business and arts communities together to celebrate writing and raise funds for the Writers' Trust of Canada. Corporate donors and individual patrons are seated at a table with a published Canadian author and enjoy an evening of conversation and literary entertainment. Hundreds of thousands of dollars are raised on this night alone, when more than fifty of Canada's top writers mingle with curious guests. Canadian publishers donate each attending author's recent book, ensuring that everyone goes home with a signed copy.

=== Literary salons ===
The Writers' Trust works with individuals to organize private fundraisers called literary salons. Events include dinner parties, evening cocktail parties, weekend brunches, wine tasting experiences, and children's tea parties, to raise funds for the organization. The Writers' Trust helps each host secure an ideal literary guest; past participating authors include Lawrence Hill, Adrienne Clarkson, Margaret MacMillan, and Robert Rotenberg. A literary salon helps to promote the work of a Canadian writer, and all proceeds support the charitable work of the Writers' Trust of Canada.

== See also ==
- Lists of Canadian writers
