= Fred Griffiths (actor) =

English actor (1912–1994)

- in Turn the Key Softly (1953)
- Born: Frederick David Griffiths; 8 March 1912; Ludlow, Shropshire, England
- Died: 27 August 1994 (aged 82); London, England
- Years active: 1943–1979
- Spouse: Emily Sadler (m. 1934; died 1982)
- Children: 1

Frederick David Griffiths (8 March 1912 – 27 August 1994) was an English film and television actor. A former London cabbie and wartime fire fighter, he was discovered by director Humphrey Jennings and cast in his documentary film Fires Were Started in 1943. Over the next four decades he played supporting roles and bit parts in more than 150 films, including various Ealing, Boulting Brothers, and Carry On comedies, before eventually retiring in 1984.

== Selected filmography ==
- Nine Men (1943) – Base Sergeant (uncredited)
- Fires Were Started (1943) – Johnny Daniels (uncredited)
- So Well Remembered (1947) – Mill Worker (uncredited)
- It Always Rains on Sunday (1947) – Sam
- Escape (1948) – Dart Player (uncredited)
- It's Hard to Be Good (1948) – Chauffeur (uncredited)
- Passport to Pimlico (1949) – Spiv
- The Huggetts Abroad (1949) – Taxi Driver (uncredited)
- Stop Press Girl (1949) – Truck Driver (uncredited)
- Golden Arrow (1949) – 2nd Military policeman
- Double Confession (1950) – The Spiv
- Pool of London (1951) – Sailor on Barge (uncredited)
- The Lavender Hill Mob (1951) – Taxi Driver (uncredited)
- Lady Godiva Rides Again (1951) – River Boat Guide (uncredited)
- The Woman's Angle (1952) – (Cockney), at end of 'bus stop)
- Judgment Deferred (1952) – Condemned Man (uncredited)
- I Believe in You (1952) – Crump
- Something Money Can't Buy (1952) - Customer at Fairground (uncredited)
- My Wife's Lodger (1952) – Driver
- The Cruel Sea (1953) – Gracey
- Street of Shadows (1953) – Cab Driver ( His voice was dubbed by uncredited person).
- Genevieve (1953) – Ice Cream Seller (uncredited)
- Turn the Key Softly (1953) – Newspaper Seller (uncredited)
- Wheel of Fate (1953)
- The Final Test (1953) – Taxi Driver (uncredited)
- A Day to Remember (1953) – Barman on Ferry (uncredited)
- Meet Mr Lucifer (1953) – Removal Man
- The Million Pound Note (1954) – Serpentine Boatman (uncredited)
- Hell Below Zero (1954) – Drunken Sailor
- You Know What Sailors Are (1954) – 2nd Lorry Driver (uncredited)
- Bang! You're Dead (1954) – Milche
- Doctor in the House (1954) – Taxi Driver (uncredited)
- The Sleeping Tiger (1954) – Taxi Driver
- Carrington V.C. (1954) – Fred – 2nd Soldier in Naafi (uncredited)
- Companions in Crime (1954)
- One Good Turn (1955) – Shouting Boxing Spectator (uncredited)
- Raising a Riot (1955) – Bargee (uncredited)
- See How They Run (1955) – (uncredited)
- Doctor at Sea (1955) – Seaman (uncredited)
- John and Julie (1955) – Taxi Driver
- Secret Venture (1955) – Gymnasium Attendant
- The Ladykillers (1955) – Junk Man (uncredited)
- Lost (1956) – Gamble (uncredited)
- It's Never Too Late (1956) – Removal man (uncredited)
- 23 Paces to Baker Street (1956) – Taxi Driver (uncredited)
- The Long Arm (1956) – Barman (uncredited)
- Reach for the Sky (1956) – Lorry Driver (uncredited)
- Sailor Beware! (1956) – Taxi Driver
- Dry Rot (1956) – Bookie
- Up in the World (1956) – Steve (uncredited)
- You Pay Your Money (1957) – Fred (Driver)
- Just My Luck (1957) – Alfie (uncredited)
- Barnacle Bill (1957) – Bus Driver
- Morning Call (film) (1957)- (Taxi Driver) (uncredited) (US: 'The Strange Case of Dr. Manning'):- Republic Pictures release
- Dunkirk (1958) – Old Sweat
- Next to No Time (1958) – Customer
- A Cry from the Streets (1958) – Mr. Hodges
- The Horse's Mouth (1958) – (uncredited)
- The Square Peg (1958) – Lorry Driver (uncredited)
- The Captain's Table (1959) – Plumber (uncredited)
- No Trees in the Street (1959) – Street Orator
- Carry On Nurse (1959) – Second Ambulance Man
- Left Right and Centre (1959) – Billingsgate Porter (uncredited)
- I'm All Right Jack (1959) – Charlie
- Jungle Street (1960) – Dealer
- The Battle of the Sexes (1960) – 1st Porter
- Light Up the Sky! (1960) – Mr. Jennings
- Doctor in Love (1960) – Ambulance Driver (uncredited)
- There Was a Crooked Man (1960) – Taxi Driver
- No Love for Johnnie (1961) – Taxi Driver (uncredited)
- Carry On Regardless (1961) – Taxi Driver
- Over the Odds (1961) – Fruit Vendor
- Play It Cool (1962) – Skinner's Cab Driver (uncredited)
- The War Lover (1962) – Taxi Driver (uncredited)
- On the Beat (1962) – Cabbie (uncredited)
- Heavens Above! (1963) – Angry Man in Crowd Scene (uncredited)
- Murder at the Gallop (1963) – Fred – Deliveryman (uncredited)
- Ladies Who Do (1963) – Fred (uncredited)
- A Stitch in Time (1963) – Lorry Driver (uncredited)
- The Party's Over (1965) – Taxi Driver (uncredited)
- The Big Job (1965) – Dustman
- The Early Bird (1965) – Man Who Gets in Lift (uncredited)
- To Sir, with Love (1967) – Mr. Clark
- Billion Dollar Brain (1967) – Taxi Driver
- Carry On Loving (1970) – Taxi Driver
- Perfect Friday (1970) – Taxi Driver
- Dad's Army (1971) – Bert King
- Steptoe and Son (1972) – Barman
- Up the Chastity Belt (1972) – Father
- No Sex Please, We're British (1973) – Delivery Man
- Love Thy Neighbour (1973) – Taxi Driver
- The Over-Amorous Artist (1974) – Window Cleaner
