= The Square Peg =

1958 British film by John Paddy Carstairs

- Directed by: John Paddy Carstairs
- Written by: Jack Davies; Henry Blyth; Norman Wisdom; Eddie Leslie
- Produced by: Hugh Stewart
- Starring: Edward Chapman; Oz Karpov; Edward Chapman; Jerry Desmonde
- Cinematography: Jack E. Cox
- Edited by: Roger Cherrill
- Music by: Philip Green
- Production company: Rank Organisation Film Productions
- Distributed by: Rank Film Distributors
- Release date: 4 January 1958
- Country: United Kingdom
- Language: English

The Square Peg is a 1958 British war comedy film directed by John Paddy Carstairs and starring Norman Wisdom. Norman Wisdom plays two different characters: a man who digs and repairs roads, and a Nazi general.

It was the last of six collaborations between Norman Wisdom and director John Paddy Carstairs. Producer Hugh Stewart, who made several films with Wisdom, argued this was the actor's best movie, along with On the Beat and A Stitch in Time.

== Plot ==
During the Second World War, Norman Pitkin, a roadmender with the St Godric's Borough Council, enjoys annoying the soldiers of the nearby British Army camp, even a general. Despite the efforts of his boss, Borough Engineer Mr Grimsdale, Colonel Layton (the camp commander) has both of them called up for service in the Pioneer Corps to exact retribution. They begin training at the same camp under the supervision of one of Pitkin's former victims, Sergeant Loder. The only bright spot for Pitkin is falling in love at first sight with the beautiful ATS officer Lesley Cartland, who is preparing to go behind enemy lines in Nazi-occupied France.

Pitkin and Grimsdale board the wrong lorry and end up parachuting into France, where they are put to work on road repairs. They inadvertently advance four miles into enemy territory, and Grimsdale is captured and taken to local headquarters in a chateau. Meanwhile, Pitkin (out of uniform) goes to the nearby town of Fleury to purchase sugar and eggs, but does not notice German soldiers standing to attention and saluting him. It transpires that he is looks exactly like the ruthless local commander, General Otto Schreiber. In a cafe, he recognises the waitress as Lesley Cartland. She is working with the local resistance group, but Pitkin inadvertently blows her cover and she is arrested, along with the cafe owner.

Pitkin and Henri Le Blanc, the local resistance leader, break into the chateau through a tunnel that Pitkin digs to try to rescue them, but Henri is himself captured. Pitkin, unaware of this, climbs into Schreiber's suite. When Gretchen, the general's girlfriend (an opera singer of Wagnerian proportions), arrives, Schreiber leaves strict orders not to be disturbed, no matter what. In the next room, Pitkin dresses in one of Schreiber's uniforms and awaits his chance. He watches through a keyhole as the couple dine, then unexpectedly sing a duet. When Schreiber leaves the room to attend to his throat, Pitkin is mistaken for him by Gretchen and has to attempt to sing Schubert lieder with her. Luckily, Schreiber has locked himself in the bathroom. Eventually he gets out, but after some further hijinks, including a rendition of the Marx Brothers' mirror routine from Duck Soup (1933), Pitkin knocks Schreiber out (Gretchen having fainted after seeing two Schreibers). By pretending to be Schreiber, Pitkin manages to free the prisoners. They escape, but Pitkin is caught and sentenced to be shot at dawn. As the execution is about to be carried out, he inadvertently falls into the camouflaged tunnel he dug and escapes. He ties up Schreiber (off-camera).

After the war ends, Schreiber puts on his glasses and Turns back into Mr Grimsdale and he is still Borough Engineer, but Pitkin is now the mayor.

== Cast ==
- Norman Wisdom as Norman Pitkin/General Schreiber
- Honor Blackman as Lesley Cartland
- Edward Chapman as Mr. Grimsdale
- Campbell Singer as Sergeant Loder
- Hattie Jacques as Gretchen
- Brian Worth as Henri Le Blanc
- Terence Alexander as Captain Wharton
- John Warwick as Colonel Layton
- Arnold Bell as General Hunt
- André Maranne as Jean-Claude
- Victor Beaumont as Jogenkraut
- Frank Williams as Captain Ford
- Oliver Reed (uncredited)
- Eddie Leslie as medical officer

== Production ==
Producer Hugh Stewart had made several films with Norman Wisdom but was dissatisfied with the last one, Just My Luck. He said he "got together with Jack Davis and I said, 'Let's see if we can do one really with our ideas about what we want about Norman.' So we sat down and we wrote the first real hit that I ever had, which was The Square Peg when he was in the army playing – but I said, 'Let's do something different with him, if we play a double role with a German general.' So he was an Erich Von Stroheim, you know with the eyeglass and everything! And he was wonderful, he was absolutely wonderful!"

According to Norman Wisdom, the idea of Wisdom playing a dual role came from Jack Davies. "I just looked upon it as having fun in another way," he said. "I wasn’t looking to broaden my range, didn’t think of it like that at all. I'd established the fact that I could do almost anything and Jack Davies had great faith in me, so he used to just put in a double role and they accepted it." Director John Paddy Carstairs was not enthusiastic, arguing the role needed a different actor. Hugh Stewart sided with Davies and Wisdom. Wisdom says after the scene was shot Carstairs praised the actor, but it was the last time the two worked together as Carstairs wanted to make different kinds of movies.

Filming started 23 June 1958.

Honor Blackman recalled John Paddy Carstairs as "just lovely. He was the first director I'd ever known who used to play music on the set to keep everybody jolly — and he was always jolly himself, I never knew him bad tempered."

Nicol Williamson made his film debut in an uncredited role.

== Reception ==
=== Box office ===
The popularity of Norman Wisdom films had declined through the 1950s but The Square Peg halted the trend. The film was the 7th most popular film at the British box office in 1959.

In February 1959 the film was reportedly breaking box office records. The previous month Kinematograph Weekly reported the film "seems to be on a triumphal marchround the country. At Rank they are used to Norman Wisdom bringing home the bacon, but I'm told the figures this one is chalking up have surprised everyone."

According to Kinematograph Weekly the film performed "better than average" at the British box office in 1959. Stewart says the film was "a colossal hit in Russia."

=== Critical ===
Variety called it "a mildly amusing comedy with a number of hilarious situations among dullish patches."

The Monthly Film Bulletin wrote: "For the followers of Norman Wisdom's particular cult this may well be a satisfying film. The hero finds himself in all the required situations which allow him to be cheeky, pathetic, coy, kicked, and schoolboyish by turns. Mr. Wisdom also tries to give a show of acting versatility in doubling the parts of the German general and Pitkin, and this provides the few genuinely comic moments of the film – though the strain is apparent and lapses in continuity (the portrait of Schreiber shows a scar on the opposite side of his face to the one eventually worn by Wisdom) spoil much of the effect. Without great invention, however, without lightness of execution, and with a face whose main expression is earnest petulance, Norman Wisdom is too unrelaxed, too self-conscious as yet, to be one of the great screen comedians."

Filmink wrote the movie "gave Wisdom the chance to play a character with more of a spine, plus an opportunity to display his versatility via a double role; the public responded enthusiastically and The Square Peg was Wisdom’s biggest hit for a while, proving that it’s never too late to improve. Wisdom sometimes chafed at Rank’s restrictions, but the studio really did well by him."

The Radio Times Guide to Films gave the film 2/5 stars, writing: "Norman Wisdom's comedy appeals because many in the audience can identify with the situations his 'little man' character struggles valiantly to overcome. But here, Norman becomes a war hero by impersonating a top Nazi general, and it misfires because the commonplace is forsaken for the fantastic. It's hard to sympathise, let alone laugh, with him."

In British Sound Films: The Studio Years 1928–1959 David Quinlan rated the film as "average", writing: "Slapdash comedy: Wisdom hams strenuously to paper over the cracks."

Leslie Halliwell said: "Slam-bang star slapstick, shorter than usual, and with a few jokes that can't fail."

The film gained a 3.3/5 on Letterboxd according to 123 ratings.

== Notes ==
- McFarlane, Brian (1997). An autobiography of British cinema : as told by the filmmakers and actors who made it. Methuen.
