= Gerry Hambling =

British film editor

- Born: Gerald Hambling; June 14, 1926; Croydon, Surrey, England
- Died: February 5, 2013 (aged 86); Cambridge, Cambridgeshire, England
- Occupation: Film editor
- Awards: Best Editing 1991 The Commitments; Best Editing 1989 Mississippi Burning; Best Editing 1978 Midnight Express

Gerry Hambling (June 14, 1926 – February 5, 2013) was a British film editor whose work is credited on 49 films; he had also worked as a sound editor and a television editor. Hambling has received six nominations for the BAFTA Award for Best Editing and has won a record three times for Midnight Express (1978), Mississippi Burning (1988), and The Commitments (1991).

== Career ==
In 1976, Hambling began a notable collaboration with the director Alan Parker that extended over nearly all of Parker's films. The three BAFTA awards noted above were all for films directed by Parker. Chris Routledge has described their collaboration as follows:

The collaboration with Parker has ranged widely, from the musical Bugsy Malone, through the partly animated Pink Floyd The Wall, to the grim Angel Heart and the strange story of The Road to Welville. They have been particularly successful with musicals, Hambling's talent for creating the illusion of movement proving useful where musical performances appear in films such as The Commitments, which Lawrence O'Toole called "a great swim for the eyeballs." Perhaps because of their experience in advertising, Parker's slick and striking images combine well with Hambling's intuitive sense of pace and rhythm, for example in the otherwise problematic Fame, and in the much trailed, but poorly received Evita.

In addition to the three BAFTA Awards, Hambling had been nominated for the BAFTA award for three additional films (Fame, Another Country, and Evita). Six films edited by Hambling were nominated for the Academy Award for Best Film Editing (Midnight Express, Fame, Mississippi Burning, The Commitments, In the Name of the Father, and Evita). Hambling had been elected to membership in the American Cinema Editors. Mississippi Burning won the ACE Eddie Award, and in 1998, Hambling was honored with the American Cinema Editors Career Achievement Award.

According to Alan Parker, by the time Hambling retired in 2003 he was one of just two editors still cutting film manually using a Moviola machine; the other being Michael Kahn, Steven Spielberg's editor. He died in 2013 at the age of 86.

== Filmography ==
The director of each film is indicated in parentheses.

- 1956 Dry Rot (Elvey)
- 1958 The Whole Truth (Guillermin)
- 1958 Sally's Irish Rogue (Pollock)
- 1959 Left Right and Centre (Gilliat)
- 1960 The Bulldog Breed (Asher)
- 1961 The Kitchen (Hill)
- 1962 She'll Have to Go (also known as Maid for Murder) (Asher)
- 1963 A Stitch in Time (Asher)
- 1965 The Early Bird (Asher); The Intelligence Men (Asher)
- 1966 Press for Time (Asher); That Riviera Touch (Owen)
- 1967 The Magnificent Two (Owen)
- 1969 The Adding Machine (Epstein)
- 1970 Some Will, Some Won't (Wood)
- 1970 Wuthering Heights (Fuest)
- 1974 Our Cissy (Parker)
- 1976 Bugsy Malone (Parker)
- 1977 The Brute (O'Hara)
- 1978 Midnight Express (Parker)
- 1980 Fame (Parker)
- 1981 Heartaches (Shebib)
- 1982 Pink Floyd – The Wall (Parker); Shoot the Moon (Parker)
- 1984 Another Country (Kanievska); Birdy (Parker)
- 1985 Invitation to the Wedding (Brooks)
- 1986 Absolute Beginners (Temple)
- 1987 Angel Heart (Parker); Leonard Part 6 (Weiland)
- 1988 Mississippi Burning (Parker)
- 1989 Fragments of Isabella (O'Leary)
- 1990 Come See the Paradise (Parker)
- 1991 The Commitments (Parker)
- 1992 City of Joy (La Cité de la joie) (Joffé)
- 1993 In the Name of the Father (Sheridan)
- 1993 Fatal Deception: Mrs. Lee Harvey Oswald (Robert Dornhelm)
- 1994 The Road to Wellville (Parker)
- 1996 Evita (Parker); White Squall (Scott)
- 1997 The Boxer (Sheridan)
- 1998 Talk of Angels (Hamm)
- 1999 Angela's Ashes (Parker)
- 2002 Mrs Caldicot's Cabbage War (Sharp)
- 2003 The Life of David Gale (Parker)

== See also ==
- List of film director and editor collaborations
