= Penny Morrell =

British actress (1938–2020)

Penny Morrell (4 February 1938 – 3 January 2020) was a British actress. She was married to the actor George Cole from 1967 until his death in 2015.

== Death ==
Penny Morrell died at the Royal Berkshire Hospital, Reading, Berkshire, England on 3 January 2020, aged 81. She had two children.

== Selected filmography ==
- Reach for the Sky (1956)
- Brothers in Law (1957)
- Lucky Jim (1957)
- The Bulldog Breed (1960)
- Make Mine Mink (1960)
- Too Hot to Handle (1960)
- Mrs. Gibbons' Boys (1962)
- A Matter of Choice (1963)
- The Wild Affair (1963)
- A Stitch in Time (1963)
- The Comedy Man (1964)
- Smokescreen (1964)
- The Early Bird (1965)
- The End of the Affair (1999)

== Television credits (partial) ==
- Minder - Daphne Mount
- An Independent Man - Mrs Bamford
- EastEnders
- Heartbeat - Mrs. Roberts
- ChuckleVision - Lettice / Fairy Godmother
- Bramwell (TV mini-series) - Mrs. Landers
- Thomas Hardy's Tess of the d'Urbervilles (1998 TV film) - Rolliver's Landlady
- The Bill (1997) - Sally
- Five Children and It (1991 TV series) - Lady Chittenden
- About Face (TV series) - Deirdre
- Valentine Park (1987-1988 TV series) - Maggie / Claire's Mother
- Stiff Upper Lip (1967)
- Theatre 625: Simon and Laura (1966) - Janet Honeyman
- The World of Wooster (1966 TV series) - Rhoda
- Marriage Lines (1965 TV series) - Patty
- Object Z (1965) - Woman
- Orlando (1965 TV series) - Dolly Dvorak
- Detective (1964 TV series) - Betty
- A World of His Own (1964)
- Maigret (1961 TV series)
- Saturday Playhouse (1959 TV series) - Marlene Cheetah
- East End, West End (1958 TV series)
- ITV Play of the Week (1958 TV series) - Jean Smith
- Shadow Squad (1957 TV series) - Isobelle Hughes
