= Angus McGill =

English journalist (1927–2015)

- Born: 26 November 1927; South Shields, County Durham, England, United Kingdom
- Died: 16 October 2015 (aged 87); United Kingdom
- Citizenship: United Kingdom
- Education: former Warehousemen, Clerks’ and Drapers’ School
- Occupation: Journalist

Angus McGill MBE (26 November 1927 – 16 October 2015) was an English journalist who made his name writing a humorous weekly column in the London Evening Standard, which ran for 30 years documenting all that was eccentric about London life. In 1968, with the illustrator Dominic Poelsma, he also created a daily cartoon strip called Clive, later renamed Augusta. McGill won the British Press Award as Descriptive Writer of the Year 1968 and was appointed MBE in 1990.

== Early life ==
McGill was born in South Shields on industrial Tyneside and was aged two when his father Kenneth, who was a tailor, died suddenly. Consequently, his mother Janet sent him as a boarder to the former Warehousemen, Clerks’ and Drapers’ School in Surrey. Brian Angel, his oldest friend from schooldays, recalled in an obituary at their school website, now the Royal Russell: “At cricket Angus was a daunting umpire, renowned constantly for bad decisions. These drew slow handclaps from the Head, Mr Madden: “Oh, well done, McGill, another wrong call. You really are hopeless!”

At 16, he joined the Shields Gazette straight from school as a junior reporter for 13 shillings a week. After six months he asked for a rise. "Think you’re worth it, laddie?" said the editor. He had to admit he wasn't, but was given another 3s. 6d. anyway.

He was called up for national service in the army immediately after World War II and saw the world, reaching the rank of sergeant in the intelligence corps. On returning in 1948 he joined the Newcastle Evening Chronicle and developed his own whimsical style writing a series titled Ghosts of the North-East. Former editor of The Observer Magazine Peter Crookston was a teenaged junior reporter there at the time. Speaking at McGill's wake he recalled: “He came in as an exotic figure, always wore a green trilby, at a slight angle, so I thought he was a really special person. He advised me on the books I should read and the plays and films I should see. So I listened and learned about good conversation.”

== Career ==
In 1957 he joined the Londoner's Diary at the Evening Standard where four years later its new editor Charles Wintour gave him a weekly page titled Mainly for Men and later McG. This featured trendsetters, designers, shopkeepers and free spirits who captured the essence of Swinging London – in the words of his obituary in The Times, "anyone who invented a new board game, or kept a tiger in a King's Road flat, or revived a hilarious old folk tradition... In pre-internet days he would try out new gizmos and test books on dieting or how to improve your memory. His writing covered everything from house-sitting and how to cook garden snails for guests to beekeeping and historic loos".

In McGill's early years the Standard’s Canadian-British proprietor Lord Beaverbrook declared the paper "my joy" and McGill a favourite who was frequently summoned to his Riviera home. He was expected to bring despatches from head office at the Daily Express in London and to provide the cabaret for house guests who might include Somerset Maugham, Aristotle Onassis, Maria Callas or Jack Kennedy. At dinner in Cap d'Ail on his first visit McGill found himself sitting next to Nancy Cunard. Introducing him, Beaverbrook declared: “I hear you are the funny man. Say something funny.”

What McGill enjoyed was meeting people who were not then famous, but enterprising: wavemakers such as pioneering restaurateur Robert Carrier, Carnaby Street retailer John Stephen, inventors of the rock musical Tim Rice and Andrew Lloyd Webber, the legendary "living lord" Maharaj Ji, and the not-yet pop star Marc Bolan whom he had featured three years earlier in Town magazine as the Stamford Hill mod, Mark Feld. McGill was also encouraged by his editor, Marius Pope, to dress up for stunts, to be photographed as, for example, a saucy niece or maiden aunt seeking advice on the sights of London.

One of his major duties was to run annual competitions in which readers voted for London's "Girl of the Year" or the "Pub of the Year", and to discover a Wine Tasting Champion and an All-comers Boules Champion, for which he styled his own team Les Enfants Terriboules. On the judging teams McGill enrolled celebrities such as Fenella Fielding, Ronnie Wood, Willie Rushton, Denis Compton, Jonathan Routh, Nigella Lawson, Carol Thatcher, Alan Coren and Tim Rice.

== Personal life ==
McGill was partnered for 57 years by Robert Jennings, a RADA-trained actor who played with the Royal Shakespeare Company and survives him. Their civil partnership dates from 2006. Together in 1967 they set up a business called the Louvre Centre which pioneered louvred doors and cupboards, expanding nationwide with Knobs and Knockers and The Door Store. A health-food café called Jack Sprat followed.

In 1963, he published a comic novel, Yea Yea Yea, about a provincial newspaper reporter which was inspired by his time at the Shields Gazette. It was made into a film (Press for Time, 1966) directed by Robert Asher and it starred Norman Wisdom as the hapless reporter in his last film for the Rank Organisation.

McGill became a founder member of the Social Democratic Party in 1981.

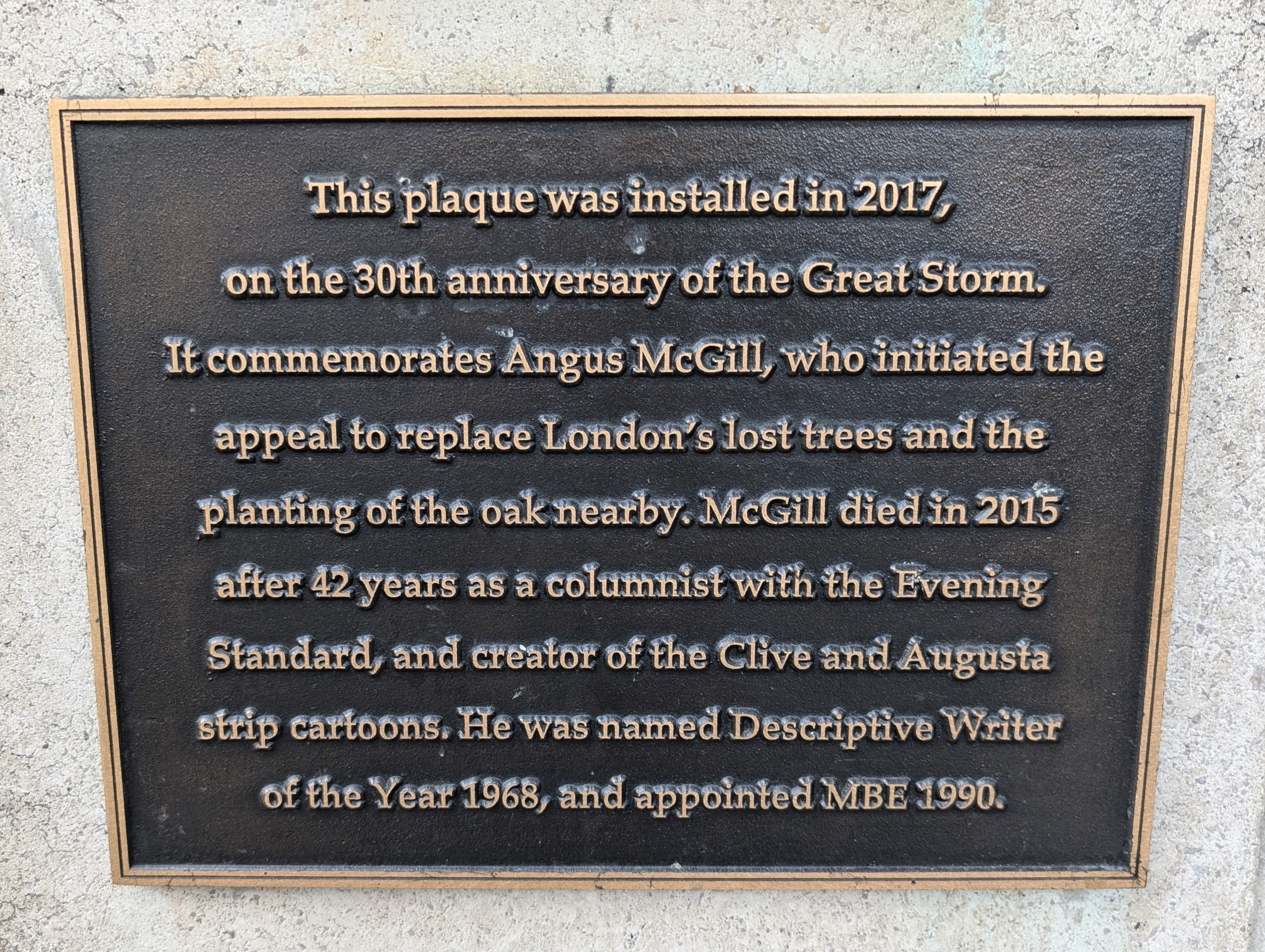
Plaque commemorating McGill outside Charing Cross station, London

The 30th anniversary of the Great Storm of 1987 was marked with the installation of a memorial plaque for McGill who led a Standard campaign to help replant the capital's 250,000 trees destroyed by the hurricane-force winds. The tree appeal raised more than £60,000 from readers and this went towards planting trees in every London borough. On 13 October 2017 his colleagues and family gathered beneath an oak tree outside London's Charing Cross station where the Lord Mayor of Westminster, Cllr Ian Adams, unveiled a bronze plaque in his honour, saying that he was "an integral part of the fabric of London life". The new plaque complemented an earlier one above it, which was unveiled by Westminster City Council in 1988, when it also planted the oak as a sapling. Cllr Robert Davis, Deputy Leader at the council added: “Westminster City Council will be for ever grateful for the efforts of the Evening Standard and its readers for raising money through a tree appeal, led by Angus McGill.”
