= Peggy Ann Clifford =

English character actress (1921–1986)

- Peggy Ann Clifford in Half a Sixpence (1967)
- Born: 23 March 1921; Poole, Dorset, England
- Died: 26 May 1986 (aged 65); Kensington, England
- Occupation: character actress
- Known for: The Children's Television Caravan
- Notable work: Live Like Pigs

Peggy Ann Clifford (23 March 1921 in Poole, Dorset – 26 May 1986, in Kensington), was an English film, stage, and television character actress. She was born Peggy Anne Hamley Champion. Her mother's maiden name was Clifford.

She appeared in two of the forty-seven episodes of The Children's Television Caravan (1956–1960), under her own name. Her stage appearances, although fewer than her films, included rep, in the West End, and the original Royal Court production of John Arden's Live Like Pigs in 1958.

== Selected filmography ==
- One Exciting Night (1944) - Bessie (uncredited)
- The History of Mr. Polly (1949) - Mother (uncredited)
- Forbidden (1949) - Millie
- Kind Hearts and Coronets (1949) - Maud Redpole
- The Chiltern Hundreds (1949) - Mother
- Chance of a Lifetime (1950) - Worker
- I Believe in You (1952) - Mrs. Tyson (uncredited)
- The Yellow Balloon (1953) - Cafe Owner (uncredited)
- Personal Affair (1953) - 3rd Gossip (uncredited)
- A Day to Remember (1953) - Large Lady in Station Crowd (uncredited)
- The Million Pound Note (1954) - Assistant Matron (uncredited)
- Value for Money (1955) - Fat Mother (uncredited)
- Josephine and Men (1955) - Landlady
- Man of the Moment (1955) - Second Chambermaid (uncredited)
- The Time of His Life (1955) - Cook
- It's a Great Day (1955) - Pub Landlady (uncredited)
- The Man who Stroked Cats (1955) - Herself - (Dir. by Anthony Pelissier with Tony Britton (short)
- Lost (1956) - Shop Keeper (uncredited)
- My Wife's Family (1956) - (uncredited)
- The Secret Place (1957) - Mrs. Wilson's Neighbour (uncredited)
- Brothers in Law (1957) - Mrs. Bristow
- Doctor at Large (1957) - Matron (uncredited)
- Stranger in Town (1957) - Mrs. Woodham
- Just My Luck (1957) - Lady on Tube (uncredited)
- The One That Got Away (1957) -Railway Porter (uncredited)
- Happy Is the Bride (1958) - Bella
- Grip of the Strangler (1958) - Kate
- The Captain's Table (1959) - Alice in Photograph (uncredited)
- Follow a Star (1959) - Offended Lady at Party (uncredited)
- On the Beat (1962) - Giulio's Mother
- Sparrows Can't Sing (1963) - Ted's Wife
- Heavens Above! (1963) - Bit Part, Crowd Scene (uncredited)
- Carry On Cleo (1964) - Willa Claudia (uncredited)
- Two Left Feet (1965) - Customer (uncredited)
- Cuckoo Patrol (1967) - Girl Guide Leader
- Far from the Madding Crowd (1967) - Fat Lady at Circus
- Futtocks End (1970) - The Cook
- Sex and the Other Woman (1972) - Wife
- Under Milk Wood (1972) - Bessie Bighead
- Voices (1973) - The Medium
- Our Cissy (1974) - photo assistant
- Jabberwocky (1977) - Merchants' Nurse (uncredited)
- Murder by Decree (1979) - Lees' Housekeeper
- Are You Being Served? (1979) - Customer (nr. 7 - Agent)
