= Pat Coombs =

English actress (1926–2002)

- Born: Patricia Doreen Coombs; 27 August 1926; Camberwell, London, England
- Died: 25 May 2002 (aged 75); Northwood, London, England
- Education: London Academy of Music and Dramatic Art
- Occupation: Actress
- Years active: 1950s–2002
- Notable work: EastEnders

Patricia Doreen Coombs (27 August 1926 – 25 May 2002) was an English actress. She specialised in the portrayal of the eternal downtrodden female, comically under the thumb of stronger personalities. She was known for many roles on radio, film and television sitcoms and Children's ITV's Playbox and Ragdolly Anna. Her authorised biography, written by Andrew Ross, was published in 2021.

== Early life ==
Born in Camberwell, South London, Coombs was one of three children; her father worked in insurance for the Employers' Liability, the forerunner of Commercial Union.

Coombs attended the County School for Girls in Beckenham, Kent. After leaving school, she began her working life as a student kindergarten teacher, but soon a keenness to act prompted her to take drama lessons during the Second World War with her friend and neighbour Vivien Merchant. At the age of 19 she won a scholarship to train as an actress at LAMDA, where she subsequently taught dialect.

== Career ==
=== Radio ===
Coombs first made her name in the post-war era of radio variety as 'Nola', the dim and put-upon daughter of Irene Handl in Arthur Askey's Hello Playmates; their double-act had started as a guest spot on Bob Monkhouse's show. Coombs also gained experience as a comedy stooge in radio shows alongside Ted Ray and Charlie Chester. Later, in the 1977–83 series Albert and Me, she played both the principal character's mother and baby Albert.

=== Television ===
Coombs had an early television break when she appeared with Tony Hancock in an episode of his series Hancock's Half Hour (1957). She followed this with regular appearances in The Cyril Fletcher Show (1959) and later she became a regular performer in The Dick Emery Show. She also starred in the sitcoms Barney Is My Darling (1965–66) alongside Irene Handl and Wild, Wild Women (1969) alongside Barbara Windsor. She also appeared in the BBC's 13-part adaptation of Dombey and Son as Lucretia Tox.

After a relatively unsuccessful partnership with Peggy Mount in the television series Lollipop Loves Mr Mole (ITV, 1971), the two women found a better platform for their talents when they were reunited in Yorkshire Television's You're Only Young Twice (1977–81), set in a home for the elderly; the actresses became close friends. During her long career Coombs made two contributions to Dad's Army. In 1971 she played Mrs Hall in the first film adaptation, and in 1975 she played the dual part of Marie and the Clippie in the radio adaptation of "A Soldier's Farewell".

Her other television work included Beggar My Neighbour (1966–68), Don't Drink the Water (1974–75), Up Pompeii! (1970), Till Death Us Do Part (1966–75) and its sequel In Sickness and in Health (1990, 1992) and The Lady is a Tramp (1983), in the last of which she co-starred with Patricia Hayes in a series set among 'down-and-outs'. Coombs was also the subject of This Is Your Life in 1978, and appeared regularly as a guest on Noel Edmonds's Saturday night entertainment show Noel's House Party (1992–95) and on the game shows Blankety Blank and Celebrity Squares (1975–79), returning for its revival in 1993–94.

In 1989, she appeared in the BBC soap opera EastEnders. For a year she played Marge Green, Brown Owl of the Walford Brownies' pack, where she worked closely with EastEnders regulars June Brown, Edna Doré and Gretchen Franklin. Coombs's character was introduced as part of a deliberate attempt to bring humour into the programme, which had come under attack for being too depressing. The character subsequently became one of many to be axed in 1990 following the appointment of new executive producer Michael Ferguson. Coombs was said to be upset that the character of Marge only lasted for one year, but the producers felt there was no place in the programme's new plan for a character "whose prime function was to be comic relief".

Following her stint in EastEnders, Coombs went on to guest in the BBC comedy Birds of a Feather, Boon and the BBC medical drama Doctors in 2001, which was her last appearance on screen.

According to The Guinness Book of Records she holds the record for the largest number of takes for a TV commercial. According to Coombs: "I just couldn't remember the name of the product."

=== Film ===
Coombs had also appeared in many films, including A Stitch in Time (1963), Carry On Doctor (1967), Carry On Again Doctor (1969), Cucumber Castle (1970) starring the Bee Gees, Ooh… You Are Awful (1972) with Dick Emery, and Spike Milligan's Adolf Hitler: My Part in His Downfall (1972), as well as the movie versions of Till Death Us Do Part (1969), On the Buses (1971) and Dad's Army (1971). She also had a minor uncredited role as Henrietta Salt in Willy Wonka & the Chocolate Factory in 1971.

=== Children's TV ===
Coombs was also a regular on children's television. Hers was one of the voices heard in the children's series Ragdolly Anna (1982–87), she played Policewoman Pat in Mooncat and Co (1984–85) and voiced one of the puppets in the children's show Playbox (1988) alongside Keith Chegwin. She was seen in Rainbow (1981–82), The Basil Brush Show (1977–79) and Supergran, and joined Stanley Baxter to play Miss Flavia Jelly in the first two series of Mr Majeika (1988–89), among many others.

== Personal life ==
Coombs never married or had children. She said that twice she came close to marrying, but was not sure enough to proceed. She once remarked: "I've never been wildly ambitious; I think if I'd been married, my career would have gone out of the window."

== Illness and death ==
Coombs was diagnosed with osteoporosis in 1995, and became an active campaigner for the National Osteoporosis Society. Her Christmas appeal letter raised £100,000 for the charity's research.

She had just completed a role for BBC Radio 4 alongside Roy Hudd and June Whitfield in Like They've Never Been Gone when she died on 25 May 2002, aged 75, from emphysema in Denville Hall actors' home, a west London nursing home to which she had moved to be close to her friend Peggy Mount, who had died six months earlier.

== Filmography ==
Year	Title	Role	Notes
1959	Follow a Star	Simpering Girl in Theatre	Uncredited
1962	She'll Have to Go	Lady on Station Platform	Uncredited
1963	A Stitch in Time	Nurse	Uncredited
1968	Carry On Doctor	Anxious Patient	Uncredited
1968	Till Death Us Do Part	Neighbour	
1969	Cry Wolf	Mrs. Blades	
1969	Carry On Again Doctor	New Matron	
1970	Cucumber Castle	Nurse Sarah Charles Bottom	
1971	Dad's Army	Mrs. Hall	
1971	Willy Wonka & the Chocolate Factory	Henrietta Salt	Uncredited
1971	On the Buses	Vera	
1972	A Couple of Beauties	Sidney's wife Madge	
1972	Ooh… You Are Awful	Libby Niven	
1973	Adolf Hitler: My Part in His Downfall	Spike's Mother	
1974-1975	Don't Drink the Water	Dorothy Blake	
1977–1981	You're Only Young Twice	Cissie Lupin	
1980	High Rise Donkey	Lady attending Donkey Derby	
1989–90	EastEnders	Marge Green	
1992	Birds of a Feather	Gloria	
