= Press for Time =

1966 British film by Robert Asher

- Original British 1-sheet poster
- Directed by: Robert Asher
- Written by: Eddie Leslie; Norman Wisdom; Angus McGill (book)
- Produced by: Robert Hartford-Davis; Peter Newbrook
- Starring: Norman Wisdom
- Cinematography: Jonathan Usher
- Edited by: Gerry Hambling
- Music by: Mike Vickers
- Distributed by: Rank Film Distributors
- Release date: 8 December 1966
- Running time: 102 minutes
- Country: United Kingdom
- Language: English

Press for Time is a 1966 British comedy film directed by Robert Asher and starring Norman Wisdom. The screenplay was written by Eddie Leslie and Wisdom, based on the 1963 novel Yea Yea Yea, by Angus McGill. It was the last film Wisdom made for the Rank Organisation.

== Plot ==
Norman Shields is a newspaper seller in London, a job organised for him by his grandfather, the Prime Minister. After causing chaos. he is found a new job as reporter on a newspaper in the fictional seaside town of Tinmouth (partly filmed in the real seaside town of Teignmouth). The newspaper owner, an MP, has ambitions to become a junior minister and so goes along with the Prime Minister's 'request'.

During his time in Tinmouth, the well-meaning Norman gets himself into all sorts of trouble whilst reporting, such as starting an argument at a council meeting which develops into an all-out fight between members. He later becomes the reporter for the entertainment section of the newspaper, covering a beauty contest which his girlfriend Liz wins. They later return to London together, leaving a more politically settled Tinmouth behind.

== Cast ==
- Norman Wisdom as Norman Shields / Emily, his mother / Wilfred, his grandfather (the P.M.)
- Derek Bond as Major R.E. Bartlett
- Derek Francis as Alderman Corcoran
- Angela Browne as Eleanor Lampton
- Tracey Crisp as Ruby Fairchild
- Allan Cuthbertson as Mr. Ballard (Attorney General)
- Noel Dyson as Mrs. Corcoran
- Peter Jones as Robin Willoughby (photographer)
- David Lodge as Mr. Ross (editor of the Tinmouth Times)
- Stanley Unwin as Mr. Nottage (Town Clerk)
- Frances White as Liz Corcoran
- Michael Balfour as sewerman
- Tony Selby as Harry Marshall (reporter for the County Chronicle)
- Michael Bilton as Councilor Hedge
- Norman Pitt as Councilor Quilter
- Hazel Coppen as Granny Fork
- Totti Truman Taylor as Mrs. Doe Connor
- Toni Gilpin as P.M.'s secretary
- Gordon Rollings as bus conductor
- Imogen Hassall as suffragette (uncredited)
- Helen Mirren as Penelope Squires (uncredited)

== Production ==
In March 1966 Rank announced it would make nine films with a total cost of £7.5 million of which it would provide £4 million. Two films were financed by Rank completely, a Norman Wisdom movie and a "doctor" comedy (Doctor on Toast which became Doctor in Trouble).

== Reception ==
=== Critical ===
The Monthly Film Bulletin wrote: "Relentlessly dispiriting Norman Wisdom comedy featuring the usual round of crude slapstick as the little man with the big heart pits himself against the rest of the world and wreaks havoc in his every endeavour with only a single dogged heroine to stand loyally by his side. Every situation is milked for all it has and more (Norman can hardly enter a public lavatory without emerging from the wrong side), and Wisdom duly takes his customary plunge into pathos by unwittingly delivering a plea for good-natured reason in front of his stunned tormentors. Wisdom's comedies are evidently designed to provide inoffensive fun and games for all and sundry; but even his admirers may find his impersonations (in sepia-tinted flashback) of a screaming suffragette and a stumbling octogenarian Prime Minister a trifle embarrassing."

Kine Weekly wrote: "A little less knockabout than some of the previous Wisdom films, this still keeps going all the time and, since it gives Norman the chance to play four parts, will obviously be very popular with his thousands of faithful admirers. ... Stalwart support is given by a number of well-known players including Derek Bond, Derek Francis, Noel Dyson, Peter Jones and David Lodge: and glamour and romance are provided by Angela Brown and Frances."

=== Box office ===
It was one of the twelve most popular films at the British box office in 1967.
