= Bert Davey =

British art director (1921–2002)

- Born: 22 October 1921; London, United Kingdom
- Died: November 2002 (aged 79); St Albans, Hertfordshire, United Kingdom
- Occupation: Art director
- Years active: 1948-1987 (film)

Bert Davey (1921–2002) was a British art director.

== Selected filmography ==
- Time Is My Enemy (1954)
- Devil's Point (1954)
- Stolen Time (1955)
- The Traitors (1962)
- On the Beat (1962)
- A Place to Go (1963)
- A Stitch in Time (1963)
- Carry On Cleo (1964)
- Carry On Cowboy (1965)
- Three Hats for Lisa (1965)
- The Big Job (1965)
- Carry On Screaming! (1966)
- Billion Dollar Brain (1967)
- Battle of Britain (1969)
- Toomorrow (1970)
- Zeppelin (1971)
- Penny Gold (1973)
- From Beyond the Grave (1974)
- The Land That Time Forgot (1975)
- Hennessy (1975)
- The Slipper and the Rose (1976)
- At the Earth's Core (1976)
- The First Great Train Robbery (1978)
- North Sea Hijack (1980)
- The Dogs of War (1980)
- Eye of the Needle (1981)
- Superman III (1983)
- Morons from Outer Space (1985)
- Aliens (1986)

== Bibliography ==
- Joseph A. Gomez. Ken Russell: The Adaptor as Creator. Muller, 1976.
