= High Rise Donkey =

1980 children's comedy film

- Directed by: Michael Forlong
- Written by: T. E. B. Clarke
- Produced by: Hugh Stewart
- Starring: Leigh Gotch; Wendy Cook; Linda Frith
- Cinematography: William Jordan
- Edited by: Rhonda Small
- Music by: Ed Welch
- Production companies: Anvil Film and Recording Group
- Distributed by: Children's Film Foundation
- Release date: 1980
- Running time: 57 minutes
- Country: United Kingdom
- Language: English

High Rise Donkey is a 1980 children's comedy film directed by Michael Forlong and starring Leigh Gotch, Wendy Cook and Linda Frith. It was written by T.E.B. Clarke and produced by Anvil Film and Recording Group, sponsored by the Children's Film Foundation.

== Synopsis ==
Three children stable a donkey in a high rise flat to save it from being sold as horse-meat by two small-time crooks.

== Cast ==
- Leigh Gotch as Andrew Everitt
- Wendy Cook as Susan Everitt
- Linda Frith as Tracy Everitt
- Barney as Prince, the donkey
- Bright Star as horse
- Wilfrid Brambell as Ben Foxcroft
- Pat Connell as Ron Brewer
- Beryl Cooke as Miss Pringle
- James Ellis as policeman
- Harry Fowler as Bernie, crook
- Sarah Golding as Mrs Everitt
- Ray Howe as himself, Bright Star's jockey
- Roy Kinnear as Mr Garnett, caretaker
- Declan Mulholland as Pat, crook
- Dorian Williams as himself
- Sam Kydd as resident in high-rise flats
- Alan Tilvern as donkey derby official
- Alfie Bass as photographer at the donkey derby
- Pat Coombs as lady at the donkey derby
- Keith Chegwin as himself

== Reception ==
The Monthly Film Bulletin wrote: "Veteran talent from the British film industry continues to take shelter in the Children's Film Foundation: here we find T. E. B. Clarke, Hugh Stewart (a producer for Norman Wisdom), along with the usual gallery of familiar supporting players. But anyone looking for a reprise of the Ealing spirit in Clarke's script will be sadly disappointed, unless one counts a faint whiff of Whisky Galore when all the flats' assorted frogs, tortoises, goldfish, snakes and mice are hurried away or hidden from the caretaker's prying eyes. The bulk of the material is defiantly ordinary, the dialogue offering little more than a simple verbal commentary on the action, sprinkled with a few choice sermons (always put your dog's name and address on its collar) and morsels of slang so old-fashioned that they backfire ("That would be groovy!" says the youngest of the Everitt trio). By CFF standards, this is distinctly average entertainment."
