= She'll Have to Go =

1962 British film by Robert Asher

- Original British 1-sheet poster
- Directed by: Robert Asher
- Screenplay by: John Waterhouse
- Based on: a play We Must Kill Toni by Ian Stuart Black
- Produced by: Jack Asher; Robert Asher
- Starring: Anna Karina; Bob Monkhouse; Alfred Marks
- Cinematography: Jack Asher
- Edited by: Gerry Hambling
- Music by: Philip Green
- Production company: Asher Brothers Productions
- Distributed by: Anglo-Amalgamated Film Distributors
- Release date: April 1962
- Running time: 89 minutes
- Country: United Kingdom
- Language: English

She'll Have to Go (U.S. title Maid for Murder) is a 1962 black and white British comedy film directed by Robert Asher and starring Bob Monkhouse, Alfred Marks, Hattie Jacques and Anna Karina. It was adapted by John Waterhouse from Ian Stuart Black's 1957 play We Must Kill Toni.

It was one of several low budget comedies from Anglo Amalgamated.

== Plot ==
When cash-strapped brothers Francis and Douglas discover their wealthy grandmother has bequeathed the family fortune to distant cousin Toni, a French maid, they immediately start plotting. When Toni visits, both men attempt to woo her, but when their efforts fail, they decide on murder as their likeliest option to acquire the money.

== Cast ==
- Bob Monkhouse as Francis Oberon
- Alfred Marks as Douglas Oberon
- Hattie Jacques as Miss Richards
- Anna Karina as Toni
- Dennis Lotis as Gilbert
- Graham Stark as Arnold
- Clive Dunn as chemist
- Hugh Lloyd as Macdonald
- Peter Butterworth as doctor
- Harry Locke as stationmaster
- Pat Coombs as train passenger
- Larry Taylor as train driver

== Critical reception ==
The Monthly Film Bulletin wrote: "Rather tepid stage farce with a promising start – a massive, crumbling, cliff-top mansion – and a whacky ending, but a flat and arid stretch in the middle. Bob Monkhouse tends to overdo the antics of one of the self-centred brothers; Hattie Jacques is a splendid vision as a hilariously-hatted gossip columnist, but the role soon peters out; Anna Karina supplies the glamour, and Graham Stark, Clive Dunn and Peter Butterworth contribute built-in cameos of a kind that many will find tiresome. The production generally lacks polish."

The Radio Times Guide to Films gave the film 2/5 stars, writing: "This mediocre comedy was something of a family affair. The Asher brothers co-produced the picture, with Robert also directing and his younger sibling, Jack, as cinematographer. They might have been better off having a crack at the script, too, as John Waterhouse's adaptation is so slipshod that not even Hattie Jacques can bring it to life. But most sympathy goes to Jean-Luc Godard's then wife Anna Karina, who looks lost fighting off gold-digging brothers Bob Monkhouse and Alfred Marks."
