= Edward Chapman (actor) =

English actor (1901–1977)

- Born: Edward Chapman; 13 October 1901; Harrogate, West Riding of Yorkshire, England
- Died: 9 August 1977 (aged 75); Brighton, East Sussex, England
- Years active: 1930–1972
- Spouse(s): Constance Sparks (m. 1931, divorced) Prudence Nesbitt (m. 1968)
- Relatives: John Chapman (nephew); Paul Chapman (nephew)

Edward Chapman (13 October 1901 – 9 August 1977) was an English actor who starred in many films and television programmes, but is chiefly remembered as "Mr William Grimsdale", the officious superior and comic foil to Norman Wisdom's character of Pitkin in many of his films from the late 1950s and 1960s.

== Life and career ==
Chapman was born in Harrogate, West Riding of Yorkshire, and was the uncle of actor/screenwriter John Chapman and actor Paul Chapman. On leaving school he became a bank clerk, but later began his stage career with the Ben Greet Players in June 1924 at the Nottingham Repertory Theatre, playing Gecko in George du Maurier's Trilby. He made his first London stage appearance at the Court Theatre in August 1925 playing the Rev Septimus Tudor in The Farmer's Wife. Among dozens of stage roles that followed, he played Bonaparte to Margaret Rawlings's Josephine in Napoleon at the Embassy Theatre in September 1934. In 1928 he attracted the attention of Alfred Hitchcock, who gave him the role of "The Paycock" in the 1930 film, Juno and the Paycock. In the same year he also made an appearance in Caste. He had a role in The Citadel in 1938 and appeared alongside George Formby in the Ealing Studios comedy Turned Out Nice Again in 1941.

During the Second World War he took a break from acting and joined the Royal Air Force. After training he was posted to 129 (Mysore) Squadron as an intelligence officer. This Spitfire squadron was based at Westhampnett and Debden. The squadron was heavily engaged in combat during this period and many of Chapman's fellow squadron mates were killed in action.

Chapman first starred alongside Norman Wisdom in 1957's Just My Luck in the role of Mr. Stoneway, but the next year in The Square Peg he appeared as Mr. Grimsdale for the first time opposite Wisdom's character of Norman Pitkin. In 1960 he and Wisdom acted together again in The Bulldog Breed, playing the roles of Mr. Philpots and Norman Puckle – Mr. Grimsdale and Pitkin in all but name. Wisdom appeared alone as Norman Pitkin in On the Beat in 1962, while Chapman branched out, starring in the Danish folktale Venus fra Vestø, but Grimsdale and Pitkin were reunited for 1963's A Stitch in Time. Their final performance together was in The Early Bird in 1965, Wisdom's first film in colour. In all, Chapman appeared alongside Norman Wisdom in five films.

After John Gielgud was arrested in October 1953 for "persistently importuning male persons for immoral purposes", Chapman started a petition to force him to resign from Equity. Laurence Olivier reportedly threw Chapman out of his dressing room when he solicited his signature for the petition.

From 1965 Chapman played mostly character roles on television. His final role was as Mr. Callon for nine episodes of the BBC's seafaring melodrama The Onedin Line between 1971 and 1972. Chapman died in August 1977 of a heart attack in Brighton, East Sussex, England at the age of 75.

== Selected filmography ==
- Juno and the Paycock (1930) – Captain Boyle
- Murder! (1930) – Ted Markham
- Caste (1930) – Sam Gerridge
- The Skin Game (1931) – Dawker
- Tilly of Bloomsbury (1931) – Percy Welwyn
- The Flying Squad (1932) – Sedeman
- Happy Ever After (1932) – Colonel
- The Queen's Affair (1934) – Soldier
- Guest of Honour (1934) – Montague Tidmarsh
- The Church Mouse (1934) – Mr 'Pinky' Wormwood
- Blossom Time (1934) – Meyerhoffer
- Girls Will Be Boys (1934) – Grey
- Royal Cavalcade (1935) – Narrator (voice)
- The Divine Spark (1935) – Saverio Mercadante
- Things to Come (1936) – Pippa Passworthy / Raymond Passworthy
- Someone at the Door (1936) – Price
- The Man Who Could Work Miracles (1936) – Major Grigsby
- Rembrandt (1936) – Fabrizius
- Love and How to Cure It (1937)
- Who Killed John Savage? (1937) – Inspector Chortley
- Premiere (1938) – Lohrmann
- I've Got a Horse (1938) – George
- The Citadel (1938) – Joe Morgan
- Marigold (1938) – Mordan
- The Nursemaid Who Disappeared (1939) – Jenks
- The Four Just Men (1939) – 'B. J'
- There Ain't No Justice (1939) – Sammy Sanders
- Poison Pen (1939) – Len Griffin
- Inspector Hornleigh on Holiday (1939) – Captain Edwin Fraser
- The Proud Valley (1940) – Dick Parry
- Convoy (1940) – Captain Eckersley
- Law and Disorder (1940) – Detective Inspector Bray
- The Briggs Family (1940) – Charley Briggs
- Inspector Hornleigh Goes To It (1941) – Mr. Blenkinsop
- Turned Out Nice Again (1941) – Uncle Arnold
- Jeannie (1941) – Mr Jansen
- Ships with Wings (1942) – Papadopoulos
- They Flew Alone (1942) – Mr Johnson
- The October Man (1947) – Mr Peachy
- It Always Rains on Sunday (1947) – George Sandigate
- Mr. Perrin and Mr. Traill (1948) – Birkland
- The History of Mr Polly (1949) – Mr. Johnson
- Man on the Run (1949) – Chief Inspector Mitchell
- The Spider and the Fly (1949) – Minister for War
- Madeleine (1950) – Dr Thompson
- Night and the City (1950) – Hoskins (uncredited)
- Gone to Earth (1950) – Mr James
- The Magic Box (1951) – Father in Family Group
- His Excellency (1952) – The Admiral
- The Card (1952) – Herbert Duncalf
- Mandy (1952) – Ackland
- The Ringer (1952) – Stranger
- Folly to Be Wise (1953) – Joseph Byres M.P.
- The Intruder (1953) – Lowden
- A Day to Remember (1953) – Mr Robinson
- The End of the Road (1954) – Works Manager
- The Crowded Day (1954) – Mr Bunting
- The Love Match (1955) – Mr Longworth
- A Yank in Ermine (1955) – Duke of Fontenham
- Bhowani Junction (1956) – Thomas Jones
- Lisbon (1956) – Edgar Selwyn
- X the Unknown (1956) – John Elliott
- Doctor at Large (1957) – Wilkins
- Just My Luck (1957) – Mr Stoneway
- Innocent Sinners (1958) – Manley
- The Square Peg (1958) – Mr Grimsdale
- The Young and the Guilty (1958) – George Connor
- The Rough and the Smooth (1959) – Willy Catch
- School for Scoundrels (1960) – Gloatbridge
- Oscar Wilde (1960) – Marquis of Queensberry
- The Bulldog Breed (1960) – Mr Philpots
- Venus fra Vestø (1962) – Englænder
- A Stitch in Time (1963) – Mr Grimsdale
- Hide and Seek (1964) – McPherson
- Joey Boy (1965) – Tom Hobson
- The Early Bird (1965) – Mr Grimsdale
- The Man Who Haunted Himself (1970) – Barton

== Selected stage appearances ==
- Blue Comet by Eden Phillpotts (1927)
- The Combined Maze by Frank Vosper (1927)
- Leave It to Psmith by Ian Hay and P.G. Wodehouse (1930)
- The Good Companions by J.B. Priestley (1931)
- Chase the Ace by Anthony Kimmins (1935)
- As You Are by Hugh Mills (1940)
