= Our Cissy =

1974 British film by Alan Parker

- Directed by: Alan Parker
- Screenplay by: Alan Parker
- Produced by: Alan Marshall
- Starring: John Barrett; Ian East; Ellis Dale
- Cinematography: Peter Biziou
- Edited by: Gerry Hambling
- Production company: Alan Parker Film Company
- Release date: 1974
- Running time: 31 minutes
- Country: United Kingdom
- Language: English

Our Cissy is a 1974 British crime drama short film directed and written by Alan Parker and starring John Barrett, Ian East and Ellis Dale. It was produced by Alan Marshall.

== Plot ==
With the assistance of his son Gordon, Stan Butler travels, for the first time, from Preston to London to the funeral of his daughter Cissy. Unhappy with the police's attitude to her alleged suicide, Stan and Gordon begin their own investigations into the causes of her death.

== Cast ==
- John Barrett as Stan Butler
- Ian East as Gordon Butler
- Ellis Dale as priest
- Michael O'Hagan as Wilmot
- Graham Ashley as Menges
- Doremy Vernonas landlady
- Hilary Martin as office supervisor
- Pam St. Clement as 1st factory girl
- June Page as 2nd factory girl
- Bridget Nicholson as 3rd factory girl
- Kay Callard as middle class lady
- Johanah Sheikh as Teresa
- Doreen Herrington as escort agency lady
- Sara Clee as Sonia
- Peggy Ann Clifford as photo assistant
- Patrick Durkin as Dennis

== Production ==
The film was commissioned by Nat Cohen of EMI, along with another short film, Footsteps. Parker wrote: "We made both films on a shoestring and each took six days to shoot. As exploited as we obviously were by Uncle Nat, it was a nice antidote and break from shooting 30 second commercials and, considering that we shot the films at breakneck speed, for very little money, it was great training for the future. But probably they had little merit beyond this. Suffice to say that Nat Cohen was very complimentary about the shorts, declaring them 'miniature masterpieces'. However, to be frank, he was not known for his discerning creative tastes."

== Reception ==
Alexander Walker, writing In The Evening Standard, called the film "An affecting story".
