= Don't Drink the Water (TV series) =

British TV sitcom (1974–1975)

- Genre: Sitcom
- Created by: Ronald Chesney; Ronald Wolfe
- Written by: Ronald Chesney; Ronald Wolfe; Jon Watkins
- Directed by: Mark Stuart
- Starring: Stephen Lewis; Pat Coombs; Derek Griffiths; Frank Coda; Christine Shaw
- Country of origin: United Kingdom
- Original language: English
- No. of series: 2
- No. of episodes: 13

Production
- Producer: Mark Stuart
- Running time: 30 minutes (including adverts)
- Production company: London Weekend Television

Original release
- Network: ITV
- Release: 27 July 1974 – 6 December 1975

Related
- On the Buses; The Rag Trade

Don't Drink the Water is a 1974–1975 British television sitcom produced by London Weekend Television for the ITV network. The series was created by Ronald Chesney and Ronald Wolfe (who wrote almost every episode) and is a spin-off from their long running sitcom On the Buses. Thirteen episodes were broadcast over two series from 27 July 1974 to 6 December 1975.

The storyline follows Cyril Blake living in Spain with his spinster sister Dorothy after his retirement from the Luxton & District Traction Company.

== Cast ==
- Stephen Lewis as Cyril Blake
- Pat Coombs as Dorothy Blake
- Derek Griffiths as Carlos
- Frank Coda as Bill (series 1)
- Christine Shaw as Beryl (series 2)

== Episode list ==
=== Series 1 ===
No.	Title	Written by	Original release date
1	"Home from Home"	Ronald Chesney and Ronald Wolfe	27 July 1974
2	"The Food"	Story by : Geoff Rowley & Andy Baker; Teleplay by : Jon Watkins	3 August 1974
3	"Dry Run"	Jon Watkins	10 August 1974
4	"The Lift"	Ronald Chesney and Ronald Wolfe	17 August 1974
5	"Careful What You Eat"	Ronald Chesney and Ronald Wolfe	24 August 1974
6	"The Fuse"	Ronald Chesney and Ronald Wolfe	31 August 1974
7	"The Smell"	Ronald Chesney and Ronald Wolfe	7 September 1974

=== Series 2 ===
No.	Title	Written by	Original release date
8	"What! No Telly?"	Ronald Chesney and Ronald Wolfe	1 November 1975
9	"The Romance"	Ronald Chesney and Ronald Wolfe	8 November 1975
10	"A Helping Hand"	Ronald Chesney and Ronald Wolfe	15 November 1975
11	"The Neighbours"	Ronald Chesney and Ronald Wolfe	22 November 1975
12	"Fred"	Ronald Chesney and Ronald Wolfe	29 November 1975
13	"Keeping Fit"	Ronald Chesney and Ronald Wolfe	6 December 1975

== Reception ==
In The Radio Times Guide to TV Comedy Mark Lewisohn described Don't Drink the Water as: "Nothing more, or less, than one of the most excruciating ITV sitcoms of them all," ranking it at No. 6 in his "The worst British sitcoms?" list.

== DVD releases ==
Network originally included the first episode of Don't Drink the Water as an extra feature on the seventh series DVD of On the Buses, which was released on 13 November 2006. All thirteen episodes were released on a two-disc DVD by Network on 1 November 2010. All thirteen episodes were also released in a box-set on 19 September 2011 along with all seven series of On the Buses and all three film spin-offs of that series.
