= Hugh Stewart (film editor) =

British film producer and editor (1910–2011)

- Born: Hugh St Clair Stewart; 14 December 1910; Falmouth, England; United Kingdom
- Died: 31 May 2011 (aged 100); Denham, Buckinghamshire, England
- Occupations: Film editor; producer
- Spouse: Frances Curl (1934–2011; his death)
- Children: 4
- Parents: Mervyn James Stewart (father); Margaret Emma Steuart (mother)
- Awards: MBE

Hugh St Clair Stewart MBE (14 December 1910 – 31 May 2011) was a British film editor and producer. He filmed Bergen-Belsen concentration camp following its liberation in April 1945 and has been called "one of the most significant producers of British comedy films in the twentieth century."

== Film editor ==
Born in Falmouth, England, Stewart was educated first at Clayesmore School and then at St John's College, Cambridge, where he was taught and influenced by F.R. Leavis. He entered the film industry in the early 1930s. He trained as a film editor at Gaumont-British, initially cutting together out-takes from Marry Me (1932) and working as assembly cutter on The Constant Nymph that same year. His first film as editor was Forbidden Territory (1934). Among the films he cut were Evergreen (1934), Alfred Hitchcock's original version of The Man Who Knew Too Much (1934), Dark Journey (1937), Action for Slander (1937), South Riding (1938), St. Martin's Lane (1938), and The Spy in Black (1939).

== World War II ==
During World War II, Stewart was commissioned into the Army Film and Photographic Unit (AFPU) in 1940 and in 1942 led No. 2 AFPU during the Allied landings in Tunisia. The following year he edited film footage from the fighting into the documentary Desert Victory. In 1944 he co-directed Tunisian Victory with Frank Capra and John Houston, although much of that film was shot in the United States. Stewart went on to lead No. 5 AFPU, covering the D-Day landings, the Battle for Caen and the Rhine Crossing.

Stewart insisted on filming Bergen-Belsen concentration camp following its liberation, with its piles of bodies being bulldozed into mass graves, its overcrowded barrack blocks and pitifully emaciated survivors. He was awarded a military MBE and demobilized with the rank of lieutenant-colonel.

== Film producer ==
After World War II, Stewart became a film producer, beginning with Trottie True (1949). He began to produce the films of comedian Norman Wisdom, from Man of the Moment (1955) onwards, and the comedy duo of Morecambe and Wise. Although he went into semi-retirement in the late 1960s, he produced several films for the Children's Film Foundation, including All at Sea (1970), Mr. Horatio Knibbles (1971), and High Rise Donkey (1980).

== Personal life ==
He was married to Frances Curl and they had four children.

He died on 31 May 2011, at the age of 100.

== Selected filmography ==
Year	Title	Editor	Producer
1934	Forbidden Territory	Yes	
1934	The Man Who Knew Too Much	Yes	
1935	Charing Cross Road	Yes	
1936	Soft Lights and Sweet Music	Yes	
1936	Sporting Love	Yes	
1937	Action for Slander	Yes	
1937	Dark Journey	Yes	
1937	Storm in a Teacup	Yes	
1938	South Riding	Yes	
1938	St. Martin's Lane	Yes	
1939	Q Planes	Yes	
1939	The Lion Has Wings	Yes	
1939	The Spy in Black	Yes	
1940	Ten Days in Paris	Yes	
1946	Gaiety George	Yes	
1947	An Ideal Husband		Yes
1949	Trottie True		Yes
1951	Night Without Stars		Yes
1954	Up to His Neck		Yes
1955	Man of the Moment		Yes
1956	Up in the World		Yes
1957	Just My Luck		Yes
1958	Innocent Sinners		Yes
1958	The Square Peg		Yes
1959	Follow a Star		Yes
1960	Make Mine Mink		Yes
1960	The Bulldog Breed		Yes
1960	In the Doghouse		Yes
1962	On the Beat		Yes
1963	A Stitch in Time		Yes
1965	The Intelligence Men		Yes
1965	The Early Bird		Yes
1966	That Riviera Touch		Yes
1967	The Magnificent Two		Yes
1980	High Rise Donkey		Yes
