= Jerry Desmonde =

English actor (1908–1967)

- Desmonde (right) in A Stitch in Time (1963)
- Born: James Robert Sadler; 20 July 1908; Middlesbrough, England
- Died: 11 February 1967 (aged 58); London, England
- Resting place: Golders Green Crematorium; London, England
- Other name: Jerry Desmond
- Occupations: Actor, presenter
- Years active: 1946–1966
- Spouse: Peggy Duncan (m. 1930; death 1966)
- Children: 2

Jerry Desmonde (born James Robert Sadler; 20 July 1908 – 11 February 1967) was an English actor and presenter. He is perhaps best known for his work as a comedic foil in duos with Norman Wisdom and Sid Field.

== Early life ==
Jerry Desmonde was born James Robert Sadler in the Linthorpe area of Middlesbrough on 20 July 1908, the son of music hall performers who toured the halls throughout England and Scotland.

== Career ==
Sadler first appeared on stage at the age of 11 and later became part of his family's act The Four Sadlers. He built a career as a song and dance man in musical theatre and later toured parts of the United States in 1927-1928 with Beatrice Lillie and Noël Coward in the two-act revue This Year of Grace. By 1934, he had married Peggy Duncan and they toured as a double act called Peg and Jerry, largely in Scotland.

In the 1940s, Desmonde was briefly a straight man for Scottish comedian Dave Willis and in 1942 he was invited to be straight man for stage comedian Sid Field becoming one of the most celebrated comedy teams ever to appear on stage. They appeared together on stage in three very successful revues, Strike a New Note (1943), Strike it Again (1944) and Piccadilly Hayride (1946) at the Prince of Wales Theatre, London and in two films, London Town (1946), an infamous flop, and in Cardboard Cavalier (1949).

The two men next worked together on a stage play, Harvey at the Prince of Wales Theatre, from which Desmonde was ultimately sacked. In 1950 a few months later, during the play's run Field died of a heart attack.

In 1949 Desmonde appeared on television as a presenter in Rooftop Rendezvous. He was a regular panelist and occasional guest host on the original UK version of the television panel game What's My Line? (1951–1962), and appeared in several TV comedies Holiday Camp (1951) with Arthur Askey, A Flight of Fancy (1952) with Jimmy Young, then a singer working as a comedian, Spectacular (1960) Before Your Very Eyes (1956–58) with Arthur Askey,

He appeared in Whack-O! (1960) and Bud in 1963 a sitcom with Bud Flanagan and other members of The Crazy Gang. He also appeared in The Dickie Henderson Show (1963) and episodes of the ITV television series A Question of Happiness (1964), The Plane Makers (1964), The Villains (1965), No Hiding Place (1965), The Mask of Janus (1965), The Valliant Varneys (1965), Pardon the Expression (1966) and Vendetta (1966).

As a game show host he hosted ATV's Hit The Limit (1956) and The 64,000 Question (1956) television game shows and in October 1956 Jerry appeared on the front cover of TV Times magazine.

On radio he appeared with Bob Hope on The Bob Hope Show (1951) and (1954) the CBS radio play The Incredible History of John Shepherd (1954), and occasionally presented Housewives' Choice on the BBC's Light Programme.

Desmonde continued to appear on the London stage in Where's Charley? (1958), a theatre musical production of the play Charley's Aunt with (Sir) Norman Wisdom, and in the short-lived Belle (1961) alternatively titled The Ballad of Dr Crippen a music hall musical with George Benson and Rose Hill.

Desmonde was in numerous movies from 1946 to 1965 including several comedies with Norman Wisdom, and starred in several others. The Wisdom films usually involved the gump character (Wisdom) in a junior position to a "straight man" superior, often played by Edward Chapman, and fighting against the unfairness wrought by some "authority figure", often played by Jerry Desmonde.

== Personal life ==
Desmonde was married to actress Peggy Duncan (born Peggy Doreen Edwards) from 1930 until her death in 1966. They had a daughter named Jacqueline and a son named Gerald. After World War II, the family settled in London and Jacqueline later married musician Peter Howes, who was the son of actor Bobby Howes and brother of actress Sally Ann Howes.

== Death ==
On 11 February 1967, having experienced bouts of depression following the death of his wife the previous year, Desmonde took his own life via gas poisoning at his home in the St John's Wood area of London; he was 58 years old. He left an estate valued at £1,388 (approximately £32,232 in 2023). He was cremated at Golders Green Crematorium.

== Stage credits ==
- Belle at the Strand Theatre, London (1961)
- Where's Charley? as Sir Francis Chesney at the Palace Theatre, London (1958)
- The Royal Variety Show (1957)
- The Gay Musical Show at the London Palladium and then the Prince of Wales Theatre with Norman Wisdom (19??)
- Painting the Town a revue with Norman Wisdom at the London Palladium (1955)
- Red-Headed Blonde a farcical comedy at the Vaudeville Theatre, London (1952)
- Out of this World at the London Palladium starring Frankie Howerd (1948)
- Piccadilly Hayride at the Prince of Wales Theatre, London (1946)
- Strike it Again at the Prince of Wales Theatre, London (1944)
- Strike a New Note at the Prince of Wales Theatre, London (1943)
- This Year of Grace on a United States tour then at the Selwyn Theatre, New York (1928) (credited as Jim Sadler).

== Filmography ==
- The Early Bird (1965), as Mr Walter Hunter, managing director of Consolidated Dairies
- Gonks Go Beat (1965), as Great Galaxian, with Kenneth Connor
- The Beauty Jungle (1964) USA: Contest Girl (1966), as "Rose of England" contest organizer
- Stolen Hours (1963) USA: Summer Flight, as a Colonel
- The Switch (1963), as Customs Chief
- A Stitch in Time (1963), as Sir Hector Hardcastle, with Norman Wisdom
- A Kind of Loving (1962), as a TV Compere
- Carry On Regardless (1961), as Martin Paul
- Follow a Star (1959), as Vernon Carew, with Norman Wisdom
- Just My Luck (1957), as a Goodwood racegoer (uncredited), with Norman Wisdom
- A King in New York (1957), as Prime Minister Voudel, with Charlie Chaplin
- Up in the World (1956), as Major Willoughby, with Norman Wisdom
- Ramsbottom Rides Again (1956), as red Indian Blue Eagle in a comedy western with Arthur Askey
- The Angel Who Pawned Her Harp (1956), as Parker
- Man of the Moment (1955), as foreign office minister Jackson, with Norman Wisdom
- The Malta Story (1953), as a general (uncredited)
- Trouble in Store (1953), as store chief Augustus Freeman, with Norman Wisdom
- Alf's Baby (1953) USA: Her Three Bachelors (1954), as Alf Donkin
- The Perfect Woman (1949), as Raymond a dress shop manager
- Cardboard Cavalier (1949), as Colonel Lovelace, with Sid Field
- London Town (1946) USA: My Heart Goes Crazy (1953), as George a golfing instructor, with Sid Field.
