= The Bulldog Breed =

1960 British film by Robert Asher

- UK Quad poster
- Directed by: Robert Asher
- Written by: Henry Blyth; Jack Davies; Norman Wisdom
- Produced by: Hugh Stewart
- Starring: Norman Wisdom
- Cinematography: Jack Asher
- Edited by: Gerry Hambling
- Music by: Philip Green
- Production company: Rank Organisation Film Productions
- Distributed by: Rank Film Distributors
- Release date: 13 December 1960
- Running time: 97 minutes
- Country: United Kingdom
- Language: English

The Bulldog Breed is a 1960 British comedy film directed by Robert Asher and starring Norman Wisdom. It was written by Henry Blyth, Jack Davies and Wisdom.

== Plot ==
Norman Puckle, a well-meaning but clumsy grocer's assistant, cannot seem to do anything right. After being rejected by the love of his life, he attempts suicide, but is saved from jumping off a cliff at "Lover's Leap" by a Royal Navy petty officer. He persuades Puckle to join the Royal Navy, where he will meet "lots of girls".

Life in the Navy proves not to be as rosy as described, and Puckle fails at every task during basic training. Despite this, he is regarded by the Admiral in charge of a rocket project to be a "typical average British sailor", and chosen to be the first man to fly into outer space in an experimental rocket.

Puckle's training is shambolic at every stage and he is eventually court-martialled, but successfully pleads for a final chance to prove himself. By accident, he takes the place of an astronaut and leaves Earth in the rocket. He manages to crash-land on a Pacific island and ends up in the arms of a compliant local maiden.

== Cast ==
- Norman Wisdom as Ordinary Seaman Norman Puckle
- Ian Hunter as Admiral Sir Bryanston Blyth
- David Lodge as Chief Petty Officer Knowles
- Robert Urquhart as Commander Clayton
- Edward Chapman as Mr Philpots
- Eddie Byrne as Petty Officer Filkins
- Peter Jones as diving instructor
- John Le Mesurier as prosecuting counsel
- Terence Alexander as defending counsel
- Sydney Tafler as speedboat owner
- Brian Oulton as Bert Ainsworth, cinema manager
- Harold Goodwin as Streaky Hopkinson
- Johnny Briggs as Johnny Nolan
- Frank Williams as Mr Carruthers
- Joe Robinson as tall sailor
- Liz Fraser as NAAFI girl
- Penny Morrell as Marlene Barlow
- Claire Gordon as Peggy
- Julie Shearing as WRN Smith
- Leonard Sachs as yachtsman
- Glyn Houston as gym instructor
- Michael Caine as a sailor (uncredited)
- Oliver Reed as a Teddy Boy (uncredited)
- William Roache as Space Centre operator (uncredited)
- Sheila Hancock as Doris (uncredited)
- Cyril Chamberlain as Jimmy the landlord (uncredited)

== Production notes ==
Norman Wisdom had just made his first movie outside the Rank Organisation, There Was a Crooked Man, then returned to Rank to make this movie with his regular producer, Hugh Stewart, and director, Bob Asher.

Filming started 4 July 1960 at Weymouth. The film features early appearances by Michael Caine and Oliver Reed. Future Coronation Street actors Johnny Briggs and William Roache also had small roles.

The film was made with co-operation from the Royal Navy, and features several of the Type 14 Blackwood-class frigates. An early scene shows a flotilla of these sailing out of Portland harbour, led by HMS Murray (F91).

== Critical reception ==
The Monthly Film Bulletin wrote: "A naval farce which ought never to have put to sea. The best scene finds Norman Wisdom imprisoned in an over-inflated diving-suit. It is also, perhaps, the only genuinely funny scene."

Variety wrote, "the film stands or falls by Wisdom and though the actor, as always, seems to be trying rather too hard, his general good humour and energy carry him through the various situations entertainingly ... Wisdom is surrounded by some very capable performers, notably Ian Hunter as the pompous admiral and Edward Chapman as an even more pompous character."

The Radio Times Guide to Films gave the film 2/5 stars, writing: "There is no doubt where the fun lies in this merely adequate comedy – it's in the brief sight of Michael Caine and Oliver Reed playing second fiddle to Norman Wisdom. Norman is not at his best as the fumbling shop assistant whose career in the navy culminates in an il-fated moonshot. The script does him few favours."

Filmink wrote "there are two extended sequences (Norman going mountaineering, Norman going into outer space) that feel as though they might have been written for other possible vehicles and shoved in here. The film is tiresome but was popular."

== Box Office ==
The film was a hit at the box office. Kinematograph Weekly called it a "money maker" in 1961.

In February 1961 Kinematograph Weekly reported the film "ended its London runs well and truly in the money. The Navy lark didn't please the eggheads, but the masses and kids have been laughing their heads off. Norman gives his fans just what they want and expect—and why not?"
