= Carry On Cowboy =

1965 British comedy film by Gerald Thomas

- Original UK quad poster
- Directed by: Gerald Thomas
- Written by: Talbot Rothwell
- Produced by: Peter Rogers
- Starring: Sidney James; Kenneth Williams; Jim Dale; Charles Hawtrey; Joan Sims; Angela Douglas
- Cinematography: Alan Hume
- Edited by: Rod Keys
- Music by: Eric Rogers
- Production companies: Anglo-Amalgamated; Peter Rogers Productions
- Distributed by: Warner-Pathé
- Release date: 26 November 1965
- Running time: 94 mins
- Country: United Kingdom
- Language: English
- Budget: £195,000

Carry On Cowboy is a 1965 British comedy Western film, the eleventh in the series of 31 Carry On films (1958–1992). It was the first film to feature series regulars Peter Butterworth and Bernard Bresslaw. Series regulars Sid James, Kenneth Williams, Jim Dale, Charles Hawtrey and Joan Sims all feature, and Angela Douglas makes the first of her four appearances in the series. Kenneth Williams, usually highly critical of all the Carry on films he appeared in, called the film "a success on every level" in his diary, taking pride in its humour and pathos. The film was followed by Carry On Screaming! (1966).

== Plot ==
Outlaw Johnny Finger, better known as The Rumpo Kid (Sid James), rides into the frontier town of Stodge City, and immediately guns down three complete strangers, orders alcohol at the saloon—horrifying Judge Burke (Kenneth Williams), the teetotal Mayor of Stodge City—and kills the town's sheriff, Albert Earp (Jon Pertwee). Rumpo then takes over the saloon, courting its former owner, the sharp-shooting Belle (Joan Sims), and turns the town into a base for thieves and cattle-rustlers.

In Washington DC, English "sanitation engineer first class" Marshal P. Knutt (Jim Dale) arrives in America in the hope of revolutionizing the American sewerage system. He accidentally walks into the office of the Commissioner, thinking it to be the Public Works Department, and is mistaken for a US Peace Marshal, and is promptly sent out to Stodge City.

The Rumpo Kid hears of the new Marshal, and tries all he can to kill him without being caught, including sending out a pack of Indians, led by their Chief Big Heap (Charles Hawtrey), and attempting to hang the Marshal after framing him for cattle rustling. Knutt is saved by the prowess of Annie Oakley (Angela Douglas), who has arrived in Stodge to avenge Earp's death and has taken a liking to Knutt.

Eventually, Knutt runs Rumpo out of town, but once Rumpo discovers that Knutt is really a sanitary engineer and not the Peace Marshal he believed, he swears revenge, returning to Stodge City for a showdown at high noon. Knutt conceals himself from Rumpo's gang in drainage tunnels beneath the main street, emerging momentarily from manholes to pick them off one by one. He does not kill or capture Rumpo, who escapes town with the aid of Belle.

== Cast ==
- Sid James as Johnny Finger/The Rumpo Kid
- Kenneth Williams as Judge Burke
- Jim Dale as Marshal P. Knutt
- Charles Hawtrey as Big Heap
- Joan Sims as Belle Armitage
- Peter Butterworth as Doc
- Bernard Bresslaw as Little Heap
- Angela Douglas as Annie Oakley
- Percy Herbert as Charlie
- Sydney Bromley as Sam Houston
- Edina Ronay as Delores
- Lionel Murton as Clerk
- Peter Gilmore as Curly
- Davy Kaye as Josh
- Jon Pertwee as Sheriff Albert Earp
- Alan Gifford as Commissioner
- Brian Rawlinson as Stagecoach guard
- Michael Nightingale as Bank manager
- Simon Cain as Short
- Sally Douglas as Kitikata
- Cal McCord as Mex
- Garry Colleano as Slim
- Arthur Lovegrove as Old cowhand
- Margaret Nolan as Miss Jones
- Tom Clegg as Blacksmith
- Larry Cross as Perkins
- Brian Coburn as Trapper
- Ballet Montparnasse as Dancing girls
- Hal Galili as Cowhand (uncredited)
- Norman Stanley as Drunk (uncredited)
- Carmen Dene as Mexican girl (uncredited)
- Andrea Allan as Minnie (uncredited)
- Vicki Smith as Polly (uncredited)
- Audrey Wilson as Jane (uncredited)
- Donna White as Jenny (uncredited)
- Lisa Thomas as Sally (uncredited)
- Gloria Best as Bridget (uncredited)
- George Mossman as Stagecoach driver (uncredited)
- Richard O'Brien as Rider (uncredited)
- Eric Rogers as Pianist (uncredited)

== Crew ==
- Screenplay – Talbot Rothwell
- Music – Eric Rogers
- Songs – Eric Rogers & Alan Rogers
- Associate Producer – Frank Bevis
- Art Director – Bert Davey
- Editor – Rod Keys
- Director of Photography – Alan Hume
- Camera Operator – Godfrey Godar
- Assistant Director – Peter Bolton
- Unit Manager – Ron Jackson
- Make-up – Geoffrey Rodway
- Sound Editor – Jim Groom
- Sound Recordists – Robert T MacPhee & Ken Barker
- Hairdressing – Stella Rivers
- Costume Designer – Cynthia Tingey
- Assistant Editor – Jack Gardner
- Horse Master – Jeremy Taylor
- Continuity – Gladys Goldsmith
- Producer – Peter Rogers
- Director – Gerald Thomas

== Production ==
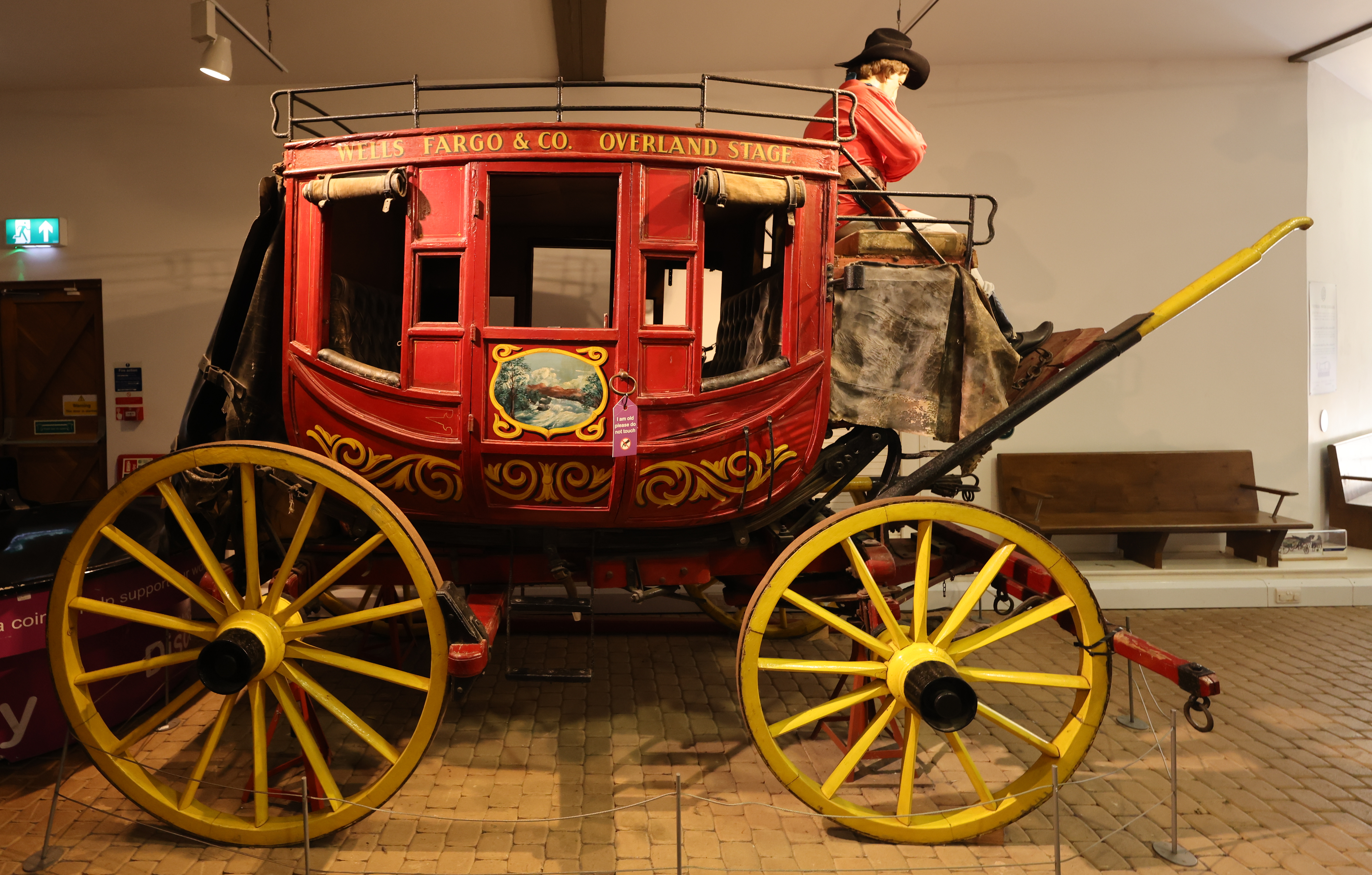
Replica stagecoach used in the film

The film was made between 12 July and 3 September 1965. Interiors were done at Pinewood Studios, Buckinghamshire while exteriors were shot on Chobham Common, Surrey and at Black Park, Fulmer, Buckinghamshire.

== Soundtrack ==
Carry On Cowboy was the first film in the series to have a sung main titles theme. Douglas has a saloon bar scene in which she sings "This is the Night for Love".

== Critical reception ==
Writing in 1966, The Monthly Film Bulletin opined "there are some quite clever and amusing ideas, but an even heavier than usual reliance on outrageous puns and not particularly subtle double entendres. This, in fact, is the nearest-the-knuckle of the series, and some of the gags make the "A" certificate eminently reasonable". More recently, Allmovie called the film "one of the best of the long-running Carry on series."

== Notes ==
Citations

Bibliography

- Davidson, Andy (2012). Carry On Confidential. London: Miwk. ISBN 978-1908630018.
- Sheridan, Simon (2011). Keeping the British End Up – Four Decades of Saucy Cinema. London: Titan Books. ISBN 978-0857682796.
- Webber, Richard (2009). 50 Years of Carry On. London: Arrow. ISBN 978-0099490074.
- Hudis, Norman (2008). No Laughing Matter. London: Apex. ISBN 978-1906358150.
- Keeping the British End Up: Four Decades of Saucy Cinema by Simon Sheridan (third edition) (2007) (Reynolds & Hearn Books)
- Ross, Robert (2002). The Carry On Companion. London: Batsford. ISBN 978-0713487718.
- Bright, Morris; Ross, Robert (2000). Mr Carry On – The Life & Work of Peter Rogers. London: BBC Books. ISBN 978-0563551836.
- Rigelsford, Adrian (1996). Carry On Laughing – a celebration. London: Virgin. ISBN 1-85227-554-5.
- Hibbin, Sally & Nina (1988). What a Carry On. London: Hamlyn. ISBN 978-0600558194.
- Eastaugh, Kenneth (1978). The Carry On Book. London: David & Charles. ISBN 978-0715374030.
