= Harry Locke =

English actor (1912–1987)

- in On the Fiddle (1961)
- Born: 10 December 1912; London, England
- Died: 7 September 1987 (aged 74); London, England
- Occupation: Actor

Harry Locke (10 December 1912 – 7 September 1987) was an English character actor.

== Life and career ==
He was born in London. He began acting in his teens, and appeared with the Questors Theatre Company in Ealing from 1936, when known as Lionel Locke. From 1940, he served in the military, but returned to acting after demobilisation. He married, and lived in South Leigh, Oxfordshire, where he became friends with poet and playwright Dylan Thomas. Their friendship was described by Locke in a 1970s interview with the radio journalist Colin Edwards.

Locke was a familiar face in three decades of British cinema, playing small parts such as assorted cockneys, working men, clerks, porters and cab drivers, with appearances including George in Civvy Street (1946), Passport to Pimlico (1949), Reach for the Sky (1956), Carry On Nurse (1959), The Devil-Ship Pirates (1964), Alfie (1966), The Family Way (1966), and The Creeping Flesh (1973).

His numerous roles on TV included Randall and Hopkirk (Deceased) as a night porter in 1969. In 1972 he played Platon Karataev in the BBC production of War and Peace, with his final role, playing a gardener, in an episode of Just William, in 1977.

He married Joan Cowderoy in 1943, and Cordelia Sewell in 1952.

== Selected filmography ==
- The Day Will Dawn (1942) - (uncredited)
- George in Civvy Street (1946) - (uncredited)
- Piccadilly Incident (1946) - (uncredited)
- No Room at the Inn (1948) - Tobacconist (uncredited)
- Passport to Pimlico (1949) - Sergeant
- Private Angelo (1949) - Cpl. Trivet
- Treasure Island (1950) - Haggott
- The Naked Heart (1950)
- High Treason (1951) - Andy - Telephone Engineer (uncredited)
- Judgment Deferred (1952) - Bert
- Angels One Five (1952) - Look Out
- Father's Doing Fine (1952) - Little Man (uncredited)
- My Wife's Lodger (1952) - Passer-by
- Tread Softly (1952) - Nutty Potts
- Time Bomb (1953) - Train Fireman
- The Red Beret (1953) - Medical Orderly
- Devil on Horseback (1954) - (uncredited)
- Doctor in the House (1954) - Jessup
- The Teckman Mystery (1954) - Leonard
- A Kid for Two Farthings (1955) - (uncredited)
- A Yank in Ermine (1955) - Clayton
- The Long Arm (1956) - Secondhand Dealer
- Yield to the Night (1956) - Fred Hilton
- Reach for the Sky (1956) - Bates
- The Baby and the Battleship (1956) - CPO Blades
- The Silken Affair (1956) - Tobacconist
- Town on Trial (1957) - Sgt. Beale
- The Happy Road (1957) - Emerson (uncredited)
- Doctor at Large (1957) - Porter
- Woman in a Dressing Gown (1957) - Wine merchant
- Barnacle Bill (1957) - Reporter
- Nowhere to Go (1958) - George Bendel (uncredited)
- The Captain's Table (1959) - Hole
- Carlton-Browne of the F.O. (1959) - Gaillardian Commentator
- Carry On Nurse (1959) - Mick the Orderly
- Serious Charge (1959) - (uncredited)
- I'm All Right Jack (1959) - Trade Union Official
- Upstairs and Downstairs (1959) - Train Ticket Inspector (uncredited)
- Sink the Bismarck! (1960) - (uncredited)
- Clue of the Twisted Candle (1960) - Amis
- Light Up the Sky! (1960) - Roland Kenyon
- The Girl on the Boat (1961) - (uncredited)
- The Man in the Back Seat (1961) - Joe Carter
- Watch It, Sailor! (1961) - Ticket Collector (uncredited)
- On the Fiddle (1961) - Huxtable
- Never Back Losers (1961) - Burnside
- Play It Cool (1962) - Train Guard (uncredited)
- She'll Have to Go (1962) - Stationmaster
- Crooks Anonymous (1962) - Fred
- Two and Two Make Six (1962) - Ted
- In the Doghouse (1962) - Sid West
- Tiara Tahiti (1962) - (uncredited)
- Kill or Cure (1962) - Higgins
- The Wild and the Willing (1962) - 2nd Customer
- The Amorous Prawn (1962) - Albert Huggin
- The L-Shaped Room (1962) - Newsagent
- The Small World of Sammy Lee (1963) - Stage Manager
- Heavens Above! (1963) - Shop Steward
- What a Crazy World (1963) - George
- A Home of Your Own (1964)
- The Devil-Ship Pirates (1964) - Bragg
- The Counterfeit Constable (1964)
- The Early Bird (1965) - Commissionaire
- Alfie (1966) - Foreman (uncredited)
- Arabesque (1966) - Zoo Guard (uncredited)
- The Family Way (1966) - Mr. Stubbs
- Mister Ten Per Cent (1967) - Theatre Heckler - (uncredited)
- Half a Sixpence (1967) - Weight Guesser
- Carry On Doctor (1967) - Sam
- Subterfuge (1968) - Tramp
- Oh! What a Lovely War (1969) - Heckler at Pankhurst Speech
- Carry On Again Doctor (1969) - Porter
- Tales from the Crypt (1972) - Harry the Cook (segment "Blind Alleys")
- The Creeping Flesh (1973) - Barman
