= Love and How to Cure It =

1937 film by Royston Morley

Love and How to Cure It is a 1937 British comedy film directed by Royston Morley, based on a story by Thornton Wilder and starring Sara Gregory, Louise Hampton, Edward Chapman and Athene Seyler. It was made by the BBC for television, but also shown in cinemas as well.
