= Alan Marshall (producer) =

British film producer (born 1938)

- Born: 12 August 1938 (age 87); London, England
- Occupation: Film producer
- Years active: 1952–present

Alan Marshall (born 12 August 1938) is a British film producer.

In 1967, Marshall was working as a film editor at Signal Films (part of EUE/Screen Gems) in Berwick St London. He left to be a commercials producer at Collett, Dickenson & Pearce (CDP). In 1970, he and director Alan Parker established an advertising company, which brought the pair domestic and international awards.

Before producing feature films, with help from CDP, Marshall and Parker started the TVC production company Alan Parker Productions. Marshall and Parker's first feature film, the 1976 musical Bugsy Malone, garnered critical success, achieving eight British Academy Award nominations. The pair followed their successful feature film debut with the 1978 neo-noir drama Midnight Express, written by Oliver Stone, with David Puttnam joining the producing team. The film was nominated for six Academy Awards, and took home Oscars for best screenplay and best original score. It was also nominated for the Cannes Film Festival's Palme d'Or.

Marshall continued to make his mark as a film producer with critical films including Fame, Shoot the Moon, and Pink Floyd – The Wall. After the 1987 film Angel Heart, Marshall decided to leave working with Parker to focus on other feature films. Marshall has been the producer for other features such as Homeboy, Jacob's Ladder, Basic Instinct and Hollow Man.

== Filmography ==
He was a producer in all films unless otherwise noted.

=== Film ===
Year	Film	Credit
1974	Our Cissy (short)	
1976	Bugsy Malone	
1978	Midnight Express	
1980	Fame	
1982	Shoot the Moon	
1982	Pink Floyd – The Wall	
1984	Another Country	
1984	Birdy	
1987	Angel Heart	
1987	Leonard Part 6	Executive producer
1988	Homeboy	
1990	Jacob's Ladder	
1992	Basic Instinct	
1993	Cliffhanger	
1995	Showgirls	
1997	Starship Troopers	
2000	Hollow Man	

Thanks

Year	Film	Role	Notes
1927	Metropolis	Special thanks	1984 restoration

=== Television ===
Year	Title	Notes
1978	No Hard Feelings	Television film

Thanks

Year	Title	Role	Notes
2004	Starship Troopers 2: Hero of the Federation	Special thanks	Television film
