= Barney Is My Darling =

British TV sitcom (1965–1966)

Irene Handl and Bill Fraser

Barney Is My Darling is a British television sitcom that aired from 1965 to 1966 on BBC1. It starred Bill Fraser, Irene Handl, Angela Crow, and Pat Coombs. All six episodes are believed to be lost.

== Episode list ==
- 17.12.65 - Home Is The Sailor (pilot)
- 23.12.65 - The £2,000 A Year Man
- 31.12.65 - The Twenty-Six Year Itch
- 07.01.66 - Weddings, Funerals And Christenings
- 14.01.66 - My Son! My Son!
- 21.01.66 - The Prodigal Son
