= The Early Bird =

1965 British film by Robert Asher

- original UK Quad poster
- Directed by: Robert Asher
- Written by: Jack Davies; Norman Wisdom
- Produced by: Hugh Stewart
- Starring: Norman Wisdom; Edward Chapman; Jerry Desmonde
- Cinematography: Jack Asher
- Edited by: Gerry Hambling
- Music by: Ron Goodwin
- Production company: The Rank Organisation
- Distributed by: Rank Film Distributors
- Release date: 30 November 1965 (London)
- Running time: 98 minutes
- Country: United Kingdom
- Language: English

The Early Bird is a 1965 British comedy film directed by Robert Asher and starring Norman Wisdom, Edward Chapman, Bryan Pringle, Richard Vernon, John Le Mesurier and Jerry Desmonde. It was the first Norman Wisdom film to be shot in colour and one of the last he made for Rank. The title is taken from the expression "the early bird catches the worm".

== Plot ==
Norman Pitkin works for Grimsdale's Dairy as a milkman, in competition with Consolidated Dairies, an ever-growing rival company under the management of Walter Hunter.

Much of the humour centres on slapstick comedy, with Norman encountering various comedic escapades. These include being dragged around Mr Hunter's garden by an errant lawnmower and using the fire brigade's high pressure hosepipes to blast firemen off their ladders, after being called to a suspected fire at Consolidated Dairies' HQ.

== Cast ==
- Norman Wisdom as Norman Pitkin
- Edward Chapman as Mr Thomas Grimsdale
- Jerry Desmonde as Mr Walter Hunter
- Paddie O'Neil as Mrs Gladwys Hoskins
- Bryan Pringle as Austin
- Richard Vernon as Sir Roger Wedgewood
- John Le Mesurier as Colonel Foster
- Peter Jeffrey as Fire Chief
- Penny Morrell as Miss Curry
- Marjie Lawrence as woman in negligee
- Frank Thornton as drunken doctor
- Dandy Nichols as woman flooded by milk
- Harry Locke as commissionaire
- Michael Bilton as nervous man
- Imogen Hassall as Sir Roger's secretary
- Tony Selby as Godfrey (uncredited)

== Production ==
In February 1964 Rank announced it would make eight films at a cost of £4.5 million, including Almost a Hero with Norman Wisdom.

It was the last of several films Hugh Stewart produced for Wisdom. Stewart called the movie "very good" but said when reunited with Wisdom he "knew as soon as I saw him... that something had happened to him. The iron had entered into his soul. I could tell straightaway and so could Bob. Bob said, "He's not the same man." And we made our last film together."

== Reception ==
=== Box office ===
The film was one of the 15 most popular movies at the British box office in 1966.

=== Critical ===
The Monthly Film Bulletin wrote: "Routine Norman Wisdom vehicle, the only innovations being the use of colour, and the absence of a heroine who will see through her beau's clumsiness and regard him with loyal, loving admiration. The moments of pathos and sentimentality, evidently regarded as an essential ingredient in Wisdom's comedies, here mainly involve the horse, and are less embarrassing than the tasteless comedy with Mrs. Hoskins. As usual, the comedy relies heavily on crude slapstick, with a lengthy and repetitive prelude of tumbles downstairs, and two orgies of destruction – the first entailing the tearing-up of a garden by a runaway motor-mower, the second featuring an ordeal by water, foam and milk. These knockabout highlights are up to par, but the intervening material is weak, and the golf-course sequence with Wisdom impersonating a parson is particularly uninventive."

The Radio Times Guide to Films gave the film 2/5 stars, writing: "Well past his movie sell-by date, Norman Wisdom is powerless to prevent this dreary dairy comedy from turning sour. The satirical jibes at large scale automation are nowhere near sharp enough, while the tribute to Britain's fast-fading family firms is too twee. Regular straight men Jerry Desmonde and Edward Chapman are as solid as rocks and longtime director Robert Asher gives his star plenty of leeway."

Leslie Halliwell said: "Star farcical comedy; not the worst of Wisdom, but overlong and mainly uninventive."

TV Guide wrote, "most of the humor is slapstick, predictable, and only vaguely amusing."

Allmovie called the film a "lively British satire".
