= Reach for the Sky =

1956 British film by Lewis Gilbert

- original theatrical poster
- Directed by: Lewis Gilbert
- Written by: Paul Brickhill (book); Lewis Gilbert (screenplay); Vernon Harris (add'l scenes)
- Produced by: Daniel M. Angel
- Starring: Kenneth More
- Cinematography: Jack Asher
- Edited by: John Shirley
- Music by: John Addison
- Production company: Pinnacle Productions
- Distributed by: The Rank Organisation
- Release date: 5 July 1956 (UK)
- Running time: 136 minutes
- Country: United Kingdom
- Language: English
- Budget: £365,499
- Box office: £1,500,000

Reach for the Sky is a 1956 British biographical film about aviator Douglas Bader, based on the 1954 biography of the same name by Paul Brickhill. The film stars Kenneth More and was directed by Lewis Gilbert. It won the BAFTA Award for Best British Film of 1956. The film's composer John Addison was Bader's brother-in-law.

== Plot ==
In 1928, Douglas Bader joins the Royal Air Force (RAF) as a Flight Cadet. Despite a friendly reprimand from Air Vice-Marshal Halahan for his disregard for service discipline and flight rules, he successfully completes his training and is posted to No. 23 Squadron at RAF Kenley. In 1930, he is chosen to be among the pilots for an aerial exhibition.

Later, although his flight commander has explicitly banned low level aerobatics (as two pilots had been killed trying just that), he is goaded into it by a disparaging remark by a civilian pilot. The wing tip of his bi-plane touches the ground during his flight and he crashes, and is badly injured.

Mr Joyce, surgeon at the Royal Berkshire Hospital, has to amputate the lower part of both legs (one below the knee, the other above the knee) to save Bader's life. During his convalescence, he receives encouragement from Nurse Brace. Upon his discharge from the hospital, he sets out to master prosthetic legs. Out for a drive with two other RAF pals, they stop at a tearoom, and here he meets waitress Thelma Edwards. Once he can walk on his own, he asks her out.

Despite his undiminished skills, he is refused flying duties simply because there are no regulations covering his situation. Offered a desk job instead, he leaves the RAF and works unhappily in an office. He and Thelma marry at a registry office on a wet afternoon.

As World War II starts, Bader talks himself back into the RAF. He is soon given command of a squadron comprising mostly dispirited Canadians who had fought in France. Improving morale and brazenly circumventing normal channels to obtain badly needed equipment, he makes the squadron operational again. They fight effectively in the Battle of Britain. Bader is then put in charge of a new, larger formation of five squadrons. Later, he is posted to RAF Tangmere and promoted to wing commander.

In 1941, Bader has to bail out over France. He is caught, escapes, and is recaptured. He then makes such a nuisance of himself to his jailers, he is repeatedly moved from one POW camp to another, finally ending up in Colditz Castle. He is liberated after four years of captivity. The war ends (much to Thelma's relief) before Bader can have "one last fling" in the Far East.

On 15 September 1945, the fifth anniversary of the greatest day of the Battle of Britain, Bader, now a group captain, is given the honour of leading eleven other battle survivors and a total of 300 aircraft in a flypast over London.

== Cast ==
=== Credited ===
- Kenneth More as Flight Cadet (later Group Captain) Douglas Bader
- Muriel Pavlow as Thelma Edwards (later Bader)
- Lyndon Brook as Flight Cadet (later Wing Commander) Johnny Sanderson, who also supplies linking narration (Note: Actually Flight Cadet (later Air Commodore) Geoffrey Stephenson; the change may have been made due to Stephenson's death in an air crash shortly before filming began.)
- Lee Patterson as Flying Officer (later Group Captain) Stan Turner
- Alexander Knox as Mr J. Leonard Joyce, surgeon at Royal Berkshire Hospital
- Dorothy Alison as Nurse Brace, Royal Berkshire Hospital
- Michael Warre as Flight Lieutenant (later Group Captain) Harry Day
- Sydney Tafler as Robert Desoutter, prosthetics expert
- Howard Marion-Crawford as Wing Commander (later Group Captain) Alfred "Woody" Woodhall
- Jack Watling as Peel
- Nigel Green as Streatfield
- Anne Leon as Sister Thornhill
- Charles Carson as Air Chief Marshal Sir Hugh Dowding
- Ronald Adam as Air Vice-Marshal (later Air Chief Marshal Sir) Trafford Leigh-Mallory
- Ernest Clark as Wing Commander W. K. Beiseigel (Note: Clark is the last actor named in the opening credits supporting cast, although his name and character was omitted from the full end crawl.)
- Walter Hudd as Air Vice-Marshal Frederick Halahan
- Basil Appleby as Flying Officer (later Air Marshal Sir) Denis Crowley-Milling
- Philip Stainton as police constable
- Eddie Byrne as Flight Sergeant Mills, RAF Cranwell instructor
- Beverley Brooks as Sally, Bader's girlfriend
- Michael Ripper as Warrant Officer West, 242 Squadron crew chief
- Derek Blomfield as civilian pilot at Reading Aero Club
- Avice Landone as Douglas Bader's mother
- Eric Pohlmann as adjutant at prison camp
- Michael Gough as Flying Officer W. J. "Pissy" Pearson, RAF Cranwell flying instructor
- Harry Locke as Bates, Bader's batman
- Sam Kydd as Warrant Officer Blake, Air Ministry medical clerk

=== Uncredited ===
- Frank Atkinson as Tullin, Desoutter's assistant
- Balbina as Lucille Debacker, nurse at Saint-Omer hospital
- Michael Balfour as orderly
- Trevor Bannister as man listening to radio
- Victor Beaumont as German doctor at Saint-Omer hospital
- Peter Burton as Peter, officer at RAF Coltishall
- Peter Byrne as civilian pilot at Reading Aero Club
- Paul Carpenter as Hall, 242 Squadron
- Hugh David as Flight Cadet Taylor, RAF Cranwell
- Stringer Davis as Cyril Borge
- Guy du Monceau as Gilbert Petit, French Resistance
- Anton Diffring as German Stabsfeldwebel in French village
- Basil Dignam as Air Ministry doctor
- Raymond Francis as Wing Commander Hargreaves
- Alice Gachet as Madame Hiecque, French Resistance
- Philip Gilbert as Canadian pilot with 242 Squadron
- Fred Griffiths as lorry driver
- Alexander Harris as Don Richardson
- Charles Lamb as Walker, Desoutter's assistant
- Jack Lambert as Adrian Stoop
- Barry Letts as Tommy
- Richard Marner as German officer in staff car
- Roger Maxwell as man at the Pantiles
- Rene Poirier as Monsieur Hiecque, French Resistance
- Clive Revill as RAF Medical Orderly at RAF Uxbridge
- George Rose as Squadron Leader Edwards, staff officer, Fighter Command
- John Stone as limping officer
- Jack Taylor as British pilot with 242 Squadron
- Russell Waters as Pearson
- Gareth Wigan as Woodhall's assistant

== Production ==
Lewis Gilbert said Daniel Angel wanted to buy the rights for the book even without having read it, before it had been published, because he sensed it was going to be a best seller. Angel bought the film rights for £15,000 and showed the book to Lewis Gilbert while they were making The Sea Shall Not Have Them together. Gilbert and Vernon Harris started writing the script but Harris dropped out. Terence Rattigan turned down the job. H Bates started writing it and turned it down. William Alec Douglas tried then gave it up. Lewis Gilbert wrote the script in collaboration with Paul Brickhill who wrote the book. The film was made through Angel's own company though financed by Rank.

Richard Burton was the first choice for the lead and he was considering it but he dropped out when he was offered the lead in Alexander the Great at what Gilbert describes as "three or four times the salary". The second choice was Laurence Olivier who turned it down – Gilbert later admitted Olivier would have been miscast.

Kenneth More was cast instead at a fee of £25,000. Producer Daniel Angel recalled:

My wife said to me, 'Kenneth More is Douglas Bader.' And so he was! He was a good actor, but, looking back, I don't think he was all that versatile and he wasn't physically a very attractive man. He couldn't play love scenes. He was more of a playboy type. He was Douglas Bader! Bader wasn't a technical adviser but I suppose Kenny More modelled himself physically on Bader.

More arranged to meet Bader to prepare for the role. They played a round of golf; much to More's surprise (as he was a good golfer), Bader beat him decisively.

Lewis Gilbert said Douglas Bader was difficult to deal with and did not help at all during filming:

When he read the script he said I had made a terrible hash of it because I'd cut out a lot of his friends. I pointed out that the book contained hundreds of names and I had to cut it down or else the film would run for three days. He said, 'That's your problem. If you don't get my friends in, I won't double for the film,' because he was going to double for Kenneth More in long shots. I explained to him that that wouldn't stop the film being made; I said that we would undoubtedly find someone with a disability similar to his – which he did. In fact a number of his friends had helped me with the script, although we didn't tell Douglas that. Douglas wasn't in the film at all.

To depict the various Royal Air Force bases realistically, principal filming took place in Surrey at RAF Kenley, and around the town of Caterham. The cricket match was filmed at nearby Whyteleafe recreation ground. Studio work was completed at Pinewood Studios. Available wartime combat aircraft including Hawker Hurricane and Supermarine Spitfire fighters were arranged to take on the aerial scenes.

Angel later said that his favourite part of the film was when Bader was trying to learn how to walk again in hospital. "I've been in hospital myself, on and off since the war, and I'd seen a lot of that sort of thing," he later said. "It was a very touching performance from Dorothy Alison, who seemed to sum up so much in a few moments." Alison received a BAFTA nomination for Best British Actress.

The film's composer John Addison was Bader's brother-in-law.

The book was also adapted for Australian radio in 1954.

== Reception ==
The film fared well with the public, being the most popular film in the UK for 1956. When the film was released in North America in 1957, the American release version was slightly altered with 12 minutes edited out. The Rank Organisation, the film's distributor, made a concerted effort to ensure the film was successful in America, sending Kenneth More over to do a press tour, and setting up Rank's own distribution arm in North America, but the public was not enthusiastic.

Because Bader had fallen out with Brickhill over the split of royalties from the book, he refused to attend the premiere, and only saw the film for the first time eleven years later, on television.

When the film was released, people associated Bader with the quiet and amiable personality of actor More. Bader recognised that the producers had deleted all those habits he displayed when on operations, particularly his prolific use of bad language. Bader once said, "[they] still think [I'm] the dashing chap Kenneth More was."

It won the BAFTA Award for Best British Film of 1956.

Filmink later argued the film "became acknowledged as a classic, unfairly mocked by Gen-X critics who were forced to watch it on television too many times, and who forget that the film was made by people and for audiences who had been through that conflict, many of whom had seen people die, and could view it in proper context."

== Aircraft ==
Aircraft used in the filming of Reach for the Sky.
Aircraft	Registration or serial	Role	Fate	Photo
Avro 504K	E3404	Flying	Airworthy with The Shuttleworth Collection, Old Warden, United Kingdom. (Note: All dates are as of December 2019 unless indicated otherwise.)	An Avro 504
Avro Tutor	K3215	Static	Airworthy with The Shuttleworth Collection.	K3215
Bristol F.2b	D8096	Camera ship	Airworthy with The Shuttleworth Collection.	D8096
Bristol Bulldog	K2227	Static	Preserved at RAF Museum, Hendon, United Kingdom.	K2227
Hawker Hurricane I	P2617	Static	Static exhibit at RAF hendon Museum.	
Hawker Hurricane IIC	LF363	Flying	Airworthy with the Battle of Britain Memorial Flight, RAF Coningsby, United Kingdom.	Hawker Hurricane IIC
Hawker Hurricane IIC	unknown	Static	Believed scrapped.	
Spartan Arrow	G-ABWP	Static	Airworthy, privately owned.	G-ABWP
Supermarine Spitfire XVI	RW345	Static	Scrapped May 1956	
Supermarine Spitfire XVI	RW352	Flying	Scrapped 1957	
Supermarine Spitfire XVI	SL574	Flying	Preserved at the Air & Space Museum, San Diego, United States.	Supermarine Spitfire XVI
Supermarine Spitfire XVI	SL745	Static	Scrapped May 1956	
Supermarine Spitfire XVI	TB293	Static	Scrapped May 1956	
Supermarine Spitfire XVI	TB863	Static	Airworthy with Temora Aviation Museum	
Supermarine Spitfire XVI	TB885	Static	Flying condition United Kingdom with Biggin Hill Heritage.	
Supermarine Spitfire XVI	TE288	Static	Preserved at Royal New Zealand Air Force Museum, Wigram, New Zealand	TE288
Supermarine Spitfire XVI	TE341	Static	Scrapped at Pinewood Studios	
Supermarine Spitfire XVI	TE358	Flying	Scrapped by Coley's Ltd, Feltham, United Kingdom in April 1957	
Supermarine Spitfire XVI	TE456	Flying	Preserved at Auckland War Memorial Museum, Auckland, New Zealand	Supermarine Spitfire XVI
