= Philip Green (composer) =

British composer and musician (1911–1982)

- Born: Henry Green; 19 July 1911; Whitechapel, London, England
- Died: 6 October 1982 (aged 71); Dublin, Ireland
- Other names: Harry Philip Green, Phil Green
- Education: Trinity College of Music
- Occupations: Composer; conductor; pianist; accordion player
- Years active: 1933–1966
- Known for: 150 film scores, church music
- Notable work: "Suffer Little Children" (No 3 in the Irish charts)
- Parents: Philip Green (father); Elizabeth Vogel (mother)

Philip Green (born Henry Green; 19 July 1911 – 6 October 1982), sometimes credited as Harry Philip Green or Phil Green, was a British film and television composer and conductor, and also a pianist and accordion player. He made his name in the 1930s playing in and conducting dance bands, performed with leading classical musicians, scored up to 150 films, wrote radio and television theme tunes and library music, and finally turned to church music at the end of his life in Ireland. A song from this latter period, "Suffer Little Children", proved so popular that it reached No. 3 on the Irish chart in 1973.

== Early life and career ==
Henry Green, who was Jewish, was born on 19 July 1911 in Whitechapel, London. His father was Philip Green, a boot clicker, and his mother was Elizabeth Vogel. He began learning the piano at the age of seven, and went on to study at Trinity College of Music in London, aged just 13. After college he played in various orchestras, and then became conductor at the Prince of Wales Theatre in London. He signed as a recording artist to EMI in 1933 at the age of 21 and continued to record for them throughout his lifetime. Green conducted large orchestras and played piano and accordion in small bands across Europe. One of the small bands, put together for recording purposes, was the Ballyhooligans, using a line-up of clarinet, two pianos, guitar, bass and drums, which played in a "near-Dixieland" style. Between 1935 and 1939 Green became well known for his Radio Luxembourg programmes, which were broadcast to Britain.

During World War II, Green regularly conducted for BBC broadcasts with various orchestras, on programmes such as Salute to Rhythm, and Band Call. In these programmes he introduced such stars as Dorothy Carless (1916–2012), Monte Ray (1900–1982) and Beryl Davis to British listeners. One of his bands during this period featured a remarkable set of players from the classical music world: Green himself on accordion, Arthur Gleghorn (flute), Leon Goossens (oboe), Reginald Kell (clarinet), Victor Watson (double bass), Jack Collings (percussion), and Denis Gomm (piano), all of whom were members of the BBC Salon Orchestra at the time. Green also became house arranger and conductor for Decca and accompanied many of their vocalists such as Gracie Fields, Donald Peers and Anne Shelton.

== Film music ==
Green's first credited film work was on 1943's The Sky's the Limit, but his first notable success came with The Magic Bow (1946), a musical based on the life and loves of the Italian violinist and composer Niccolò Paganini. The 'Romance' from that film, as played by Yehudi Menuhin, and later taken up by Max Jaffa, became a great hit. He was appointed resident musical director of the Rank Organisation.

Green composed more than 150 film scores, including The Yellow Balloon (1952), Carry On Admiral (1957), The Square Peg (1958, together with several other Norman Wisdom films), the theme song of The Shakedown (1959; sung by Kathy Kirby), The League of Gentlemen (1960), Victim, The Singer Not the Song (both 1961), and The Intelligence Men (1965). His themes for John and Julie (1954) and The March Hare (1956) both won Ivor Novello Awards. He also composed the themes for the 1960s ATV television crime series Ghost Squad and Sergeant Cork. Green made two cameo appearances in films that he worked on: as a bandleader in It Happened One Sunday (1944); and again as a bandleader in The Dream Maker (1963).

== Other work ==
Like many composers of film music, Green also composed and arranged light orchestral concert works and wrote prolifically for production music libraries. As a result, a number of his compositions are familiar through their use in radio and television programmes. They include pieces such as Cuban Suite and Cocktail Hat Suite, and single-movement pieces such as "Follow Me Around" and "White Orchids". "Shopping Centre" was used as the theme for the 1936 BBC television programme Picture Page, and was released commercially by Charles Williams in the 1930s. "Horse Feathers" was used as the theme tune for the BBC radio series Meet the Huggetts (1953–1961).

Other pieces were written under pseudonyms, such as Ecstasy by Jose Belmont or Frenesi by Don Felipe. A number of his production music pieces were used in Night of the Living Dead and in Looney Tunes theatrical shorts (such as in 1958 when the musicians were on strike, or later added as part of TV prints for Freudy Cat). His stock music continues to be used in modern shows such as The Ren and Stimpy Show, The World's Greatest Magic and SpongeBob SquarePants.

Philip Scowcroft remembers some stage music, including a children's musical (Noddy in Toyland), a revue (Fancy Free) and an ice show (Wildfire), as well as some songs that achieved popularity in the early 1950s, such as "Let's Go to the Pictures" and "Love Is Like An April Shower".

In the field of pop music, Green co-wrote the United Kingdom's 1963 Eurovision Song Contest entry, "Say Wonderful Things", with lyrics by Norman Newell. It was recorded by Ronnie Carroll The song finished fourth behind Denmark, Switzerland and Italy, and eventually reached No. 6 on the UK Singles Chart.

== Later career and death ==
Green continued to compose and conduct for film and television, including the theme tune for The Golden Shot (1967), and to issue light orchestral music recordings until his retirement in 1966. Together with his wife, he established the Philip and Dorothy Green Music Trust to help young musicians and composers.

While living in Ireland, he became interested in church music, and composed a full-scale St Patrick's Mass, which was recorded by the Trinity Chorale in 1971 with the composer conducting. It was followed a year later by the Mass of St. Francis of Assisi. This was recorded with the Cork Children's Choir and the Scottish tenor/celebrant Canon Sydney MacEwan and released in November 1972. The song "Suffer Little Children" from the latter Mass was released as a single in 1973 and reached No. 3 on the Irish chart, remaining on the chart for five months. It is regularly used as a communion hymn in Catholic churches.

Green died in Dublin in 1982 after a long illness, from cerebral metastasis.

== Selected filmography ==
- The Sky's the Limit (1943)
- It Happened One Sunday (1944)
- The Magic Bow (1946)
- Landfall (1949)
- Saints and Sinners (1949)
- Ha'penny Breeze (1950)
- The Yellow Balloon (1952)
- Girdle of Gold (1952)
- Isn't Life Wonderful! (1953)
- Conflict of Wings (1954)
- John and Julie (1954)
- Who Done It? (1956)
- The March Hare (1956)
- The Extra Day (1956)
- Carry On Admiral (1957)
- The Devil's Pass (1957)
- The Square Peg (1958)
- Bobbikins (1959)
- Desert Mice (1959)
- Don't Panic Chaps! (1959)
- Follow a Star (1959)
- Life in Emergency Ward 10 (1959)
- Operation Amsterdam (1959)
- Sapphire (1959)
- The Shakedown (1959)
- Upstairs and Downstairs (1959)
- And the Same to You (1960)
- The Bulldog Breed (1960)
- Inn for Trouble (1960)
- The League of Gentlemen (1960)
- Make Mine Mink (1960)
- Man in the Moon (1960)
- Piccadilly Third Stop (1960)
- Your Money or Your Wife (1960)
- Flame in the Streets (1961)
- The Secret Partner (1961)
- The Singer Not the Song (1961)
- Victim (1961)
- All Night Long (1962)
- The Devil's Agent (1962)
- On the Beat (1962)
- She'll Have to Go (1962)
- Tiara Tahiti (1962)
- The Dream Maker (1963)
- Two Left Feet (1963)
- The Girl Hunters (1963)
- The Man Who Finally Died (1963)
- A Stitch in Time (1963)
- The Intelligence Men (1965)
- Masquerade (1965)
- Joey Boy (1965)
- The Yellow Hat (1966)
