= Just My Luck (1957 film) =

British sports comedy by John Paddy Carstairs

- Directed by: John Paddy Carstairs
- Written by: Alfred Shaughnessy; Peter Blackmore
- Based on: story by Alfred Shaughnessy idea by Peter Cusick
- Produced by: Hugh Stewart
- Starring: Norman Wisdom; Margaret Rutherford; Jill Dixon; Leslie Phillips
- Cinematography: Jack E. Cox
- Edited by: Roger Cherrill
- Music by: Philip Green
- Production company: Rank Organisation Film Productions
- Distributed by: Rank Film Distributors
- Release date: 14 November 1957
- Running time: 86 minutes
- Country: United Kingdom
- Language: English

Just My Luck is a 1957 British sports comedy film directed by John Paddy Carstairs and starring Norman Wisdom, Margaret Rutherford, Jill Dixon and Leslie Phillips. It was written by Peter Cusick, Alfred Shaughnessy and Peter Blackmore.

== Plot ==
Norman Hackett is employed in a jeweller's workshop and is innocently preoccupied with dreaming of meeting the window dresser in the shop across the street from his workplace. He wants to purchase a diamond pendant for her and, after persuasion, gambles a pound on a six-horse accumulator at the Goodwood races. The bookmaker grows concerned when it appears Hackett, after winning on the first five races, could win over £16,000.

== Cast ==
- Norman Wisdom as Norman Hackett (and his own father)
- Margaret Rutherford as Mrs. Dooley
- Jill Dixon as Anne
- Leslie Phillips as the Hon. Richard Lumb
- Delphi Lawrence as Betty Daviot
- Joan Sims as Phoebe
- Edward Chapman as Mr. Stoneway
- Peter Copley as Gilbert Weaver
- Vic Wise as Eddie Diamond
- Marjorie Rhodes as Mrs. Hackett
- Michael Ward as Cranley
- Marianne Stone as tea bar attendant
- Felix Felton as man in cinema
- Michael Brennan as masseur
- Cyril Chamberlain as Goodwood official
- Eddie Leslie as gas man
- Freda Bamford as Mrs. Crossley
- Robin Bailey as steward
- Campbell Cotts as steward
- Sam Kydd as craftsman
- Raymond Francis as Ritchie
- Ballard Berkeley as starter at Goodwood (uncredited)
- Jerry Desmonde as racegoer (uncredited)
- Hal Osmond as hospital visitor with flowers (uncredited)

== Production ==
The film was based on an idea by American producer Peter Cusick which was based in turn on a racing story he had heard in Kentucky. A gambler had an 'accumulator' bet on a specific jockey for one day of a race meeting. The jockey won his first five out of six rides; if he lost the sixth the gambler would lose his money. But if the sixth mount was scratched the gambler would clean up on the five races. Cusick developed the story with writer Alfred Shaughnessy, revolving around a plot where the gambler had to stop the sixth race from going ahead. Shaugnessy wrote a script called I Gotta Horse and Cusick tried to set it up with Columbia Studios, attaching George Cole to star as the gambler, Robert Morley and Wilfrid Hyde-White as two bookies, and Margaret Rutherford as the owner of the horse in the sixth race. However the project fell over.

Producer Hugh Stewart, who had made three Norman Wisdom films for the Rank Organisation, read the script and felt it would make an idea vehicle for Wisdom. He persuaded Rank to buy the script which was retitled Just My Luck, rewritten under the supervision of Stewart and Wisom's regular director John Paddy Carstairs. Rutherford played the horse owner but the bookies were now played by Leslie Phillips and Peter Copley.

The film was shot at Pinewood Studios near London in June 1957 with sets designed by the art director Ernest Archer. Although the previous Wisdom film was shot in colour it was decided to do this one in black and white as it was felt Wisdom's fans would see it regardless. Marilyn Monroe, then in England filming The Prince and the Showgirl, visited the set.

== Reception ==
=== Box office ===
In January 1958 Kinematograph Weekly reported the film "easily takes pride of place" of the most popular movies in general release, adding "It's just entered its final week in London and hefty receipts have been the order of the day—North, South, East and West. No doubt about it, the masses want to be amused and if they've only time and money to visit the " flicks "' once during the week they invariably choose the hall that's showing light stuff."

In December 1958 Kinematograph Weekly listed the film as being "in the money" at the British box office in 1958. Shaughnessy wrote in his memoirs, "Like all the Wisdom pictures it grossed big money world-wide and pops up on TV to this day." However it was less popular than previous Wisdom vehicles.

Producer Hugh Stewart later reflected "I tried to do more of a straight story on the" movie "and then that didn't go at all" so he adjust his approach for his fourth Wisdom film, The Square Peg.

=== Critical reception ===
Shaughnessy wrote, "I was sorry that a number of my wittier comedy scenes had been cut out to make room for 'Wis' to fall flat on his face or get tangled up in the starting gate at the racecourse. It would have been a much better film done straight with George Cole. All the same Just My Luck got its laughs."

Variety wrote expected the film to be a hit "even though it sometimes seems that the" efforts of Wisdom, Stewart and Carstairs "will burst at the seams... Carstairs directs with his usual pace arid Comedy knowhow. But it often seems that he is running out of new ideas to exploit the star he knows so well."

Monthly Film Bulletin said "With a good script and firm, imaginative direction, Norman Wisdom might still be able to make an individual contribution to British comedy. This however is a rather thin "yes-it-is-no-it-isn't" affair, which shows little real appreciation of Wisdom's characteristic qualities."

Leslie Halliwell said: "Flat star vehicle." Filmink called it "amiable".

According to BFI Screenonline, "Just My Luck is not a piece of comedic genius, nor even the best of Wisdom's films, but it's an amiable, well-constructed piece that recalls a gentler age".

In British Sound Films: The Studio Years 1928–1959 David Quinlan rated the film as "good", writing: "Pleasant Wisdom comedy, if hardly tailored to his talents."

== See also ==
- List of films about horse racing

== Notes ==
- Shaughnessy, Alfred (1997). A confession in writing. Tabb House.
