= Follow a Star =

1959 British film by Robert Asher

- Theatrical release poster
- Directed by: Robert Asher
- Written by: Henry Blyth; Jack Davies; Norman Wisdom
- Produced by: Hugh Stewart
- Starring: Norman Wisdom; June Laverick; Jerry Desmonde
- Cinematography: Jack Asher
- Edited by: Roger Cherrill
- Music by: Philip Green
- Production company: Rank Organisation
- Distributed by: J. Arthur Rank Film Distributors
- Release dates: 15 December 1959 (UK); 25 April 1961 (US)
- Running time: 102 minutes
- Country: United Kingdom
- Language: English

Follow a Star is a 1959 British black and white comedy musical film directed by Robert Asher and starring Norman Wisdom, June Laverick and Jerry Desmonde. It was written by Henry Blyth, Jack Davies and Wisdom.

== Plot ==
Norman Truscott works as a dry cleaner, but dreams of being a stage performer. To this end, he takes elocution and singing lessons with Miss Dobson, so far with little success. He is also in love with Judy, Miss Dobson's colleague, who teaches piano.

Norman goes to the theatre to see singing star Vernon Carew and causes chaos when he tries to join in the performance. But Carew realises that Norman's untrained voice is better that his own voice, which is fading rapidly, as is his popularity. On the pretext of offering Norman singing lessons, he secretly records Norman singing in the bath, and passes the recordings off as his own –miming to the recording on television. They are a success and Carew is a star again.

Miss Dobson realises what's happened and smuggles herself and Norman backstage during Carew's performance. She sees the record being played with Carew miming to it. She exposes him as a fake, again causing chaos onstage and backstage. Norman is persuaded to sing on stage and is acclaimed by the audience. But whilst they applaud him, he slips quietly away with Judy.

== Cast ==
- Norman Wisdom as Norman Truscott
- June Laverick as Judy
- Jerry Desmonde as Vernon Carew
- Hattie Jacques as Dymphna Dobson
- Richard Wattis as Dr. Chatterway
- Eddie Leslie as Harold Franklin
- John Le Mesurier as Birkett
- Sydney Tafler as Pendlebury
- Fenella Fielding as Lady Finchington
- Charles Heslop as The General
- Joe Melia as stage manager
- Ron Moody as violinist
- Dick Emery as party drunk
- Charles Gray as party guest
- Dilys Laye as girl in park
- Peggy Anne Clifford as offended lady at party (uncredited)

== Production ==
Norman Wisdom had a falling out with his regular director John Paddy Carstairs so was replaced on this by Bob Asher. According to producer Hugh Stewart:

Over some childish thing, which I can't possibly go into, Norman and Paddy had a split. There was something which Norman queried and Paddy was flashing eyes, mad with anger you see, "He should trust me! I won't do this, will never tolerate him again," and so on. So there wasn't anything to do – I had to find another director. So I did, and I got Bob Asher. I was very sorry about the business about Paddy but there was no other way.

Filming started 13 July 1959.

== Reception ==
=== Box office ===
In January 1960 Kinematograph Weekly reported the movie "shot meteor-like into the big money and has never looked back. Cleank uninhibited fun, lightly laced with popular sentiment and titivated by tunes, it’s delighting all comers."

In December 1960 the same magazine listed the film as a "money maker" at the British box office for 1960.

The movie was a hit in Hungary where by 1961 it had been seen by 1.8 million people.

=== Critical ===
Variety wrote "this picture, sticking largely to the fun-and-sentiment formula at which Norman Wisdom is adept, should prove a happy b.o. proposition. Not since the hey-day of “Lassie” have films been so carefully tailored to suit a star personality as these of Wisdom. He's the little fellow, constantly put upen, who suddenly rebels and strikes back at pomposity. He evokes sympathy, invariably gets the girl, falls down, sings some songs and most certainly in Britain, raises the yocks."

The Monthly Film Bulletin wrote: "The potential that Norman Wisdom once undoubtedly possessed is quite obscured by this film – with its silly, tawdry script and the inept direction of Robert Asher .... The comedian is permitted to indulge his taste for mawkish sentimentality and for 'shame-dream' situations which involve him in unfunny humiliations. Such comedy as there is is mostly muffed by the lack of any sense of comic timing in the direction and editing. The reassuring professionalism of Jerry Desmonde, Hattie Jacques and Richard Wattis, and beguiling glimpses of Ron Moody and Fenella Fielding, are not compensation enough for the rest."

The Radio Times Guide to Films gave the film 2/5 stars, writing: "If you can follow the plot of this Norman Wisdom comedy, you'll find faint echoes of Singin' in the Rain. ...Norman's humour knows no restraint or timing, which makes him schmaltzily tedious, especially as he can only sing in the presence of his wheelchair-bound girlfriend June Laverick."

Leslie Halliwell said: "Star comedy with an antique plot and a superfluity of pathos."

Filmink wrote "Wisdom returns to his poor-me persona, after having a bit more strength in The Square Peg, June Laverick is dull as the girl but Hattie Jacques is fun. If you like Wisdom, you’ll like this."
