= Eddie Leslie =

British actor (1914–2000)

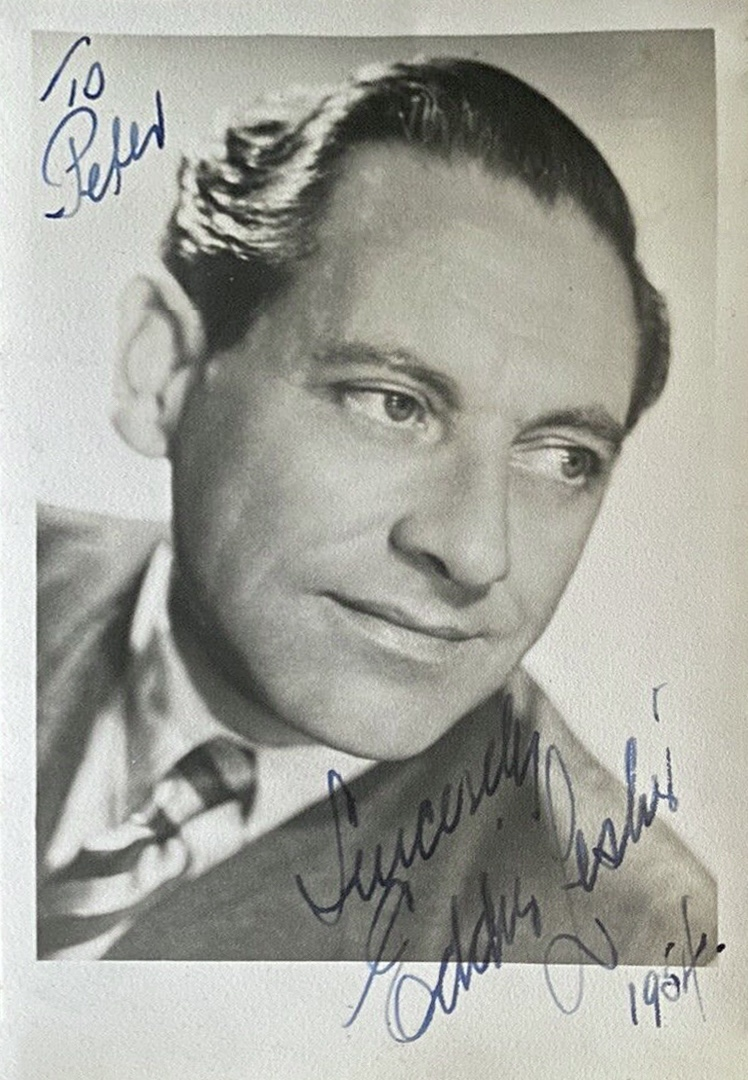
- Signed photo (1954)
- Born: Frederick Edward Leslie Whitaker; 11 October 1903; Camberwell, London, England
- Died: 27 June 1975 (aged 71); West Chiltington, Sussex, England
- Occupations: Actor, screenwriter

Frederick Edward Leslie Whitaker (11 October 1903 – 27 June 1975), known professionally as Eddie Leslie, was a British film and television actor and screenwriter.

== Life and career ==
He was born in Camberwell, London, and met Norman Wisdom when they appeared on the same variety bill. He worked regularly with Wisdom and often acted alongside him, on stage and in his films Trouble in Store (1953); Up in the World (1956); Just My Luck (1957); The Square Peg (1958); Follow a Star (1959) and A Stitch in Time (1963). He wrote five of Wisdom's film screenplays as well as a couple of early TV shows for Wisdom in 1952.

In 1956 he appeared in the first episode of Hancock's Half Hour TV show. His theatre credits include the role of Luther Billis in the musical South Pacific by Rodgers and Hammerstein, and Joshua Logan in Glasgow's Alhambra Theatre in 1954. He performed with Patrica Hartley, Nevil Whiting, Helen Landis, David Williams, Robert Henderson and Sean Connery. He also performed on television with Jimmy Clitheroe, Sid James, Freddie Frinton, Thora Hird, and Frankie Howerd, among others.
