= A Stitch in Time (1963 film) =

1963 British film by Robert Asher

- original UK 1-sheet poster
- Directed by: Robert Asher
- Written by: Jack Davies; Norman Wisdom; Henry Blyth; Eddie Leslie
- Produced by: Hugh Stewart; Earl St. John
- Starring: Norman Wisdom; Edward Chapman; Jeanette Sterke; Jerry Desmonde
- Cinematography: Jack Asher
- Edited by: Gerry Hambling
- Music by: Philip Green
- Production company: Rank Organisation
- Distributed by: J. Arthur Rank Film Distributors
- Release date: 1963
- Running time: 89 minutes
- Country: United Kingdom
- Language: English

A Stitch in Time is a 1963 British comedy film directed by Robert Asher and starring Norman Wisdom, Edward Chapman, Jeanette Sterke and Jerry Desmonde. It was written by Jack Davies, Wisdom, Henry Blyth and Eddie Leslie, and produced by Hugh Stewart and Earl St. John. The film is set in a children's hospital and features an early role for Johnny Briggs.

== Plot ==
Norman Pitkin is an apprentice to Mr Grimsdale, an old fashioned butcher. When the shop is raided by a young thug, Mr Grimsdale (at Norman's suggestion), puts his gold watch in his mouth for safe-keeping. This results in Mr Grimsdale accidentally swallowing the watch and being sent to hospital. Whilst visiting Mr Grimsdale, Norman inadvertently causes chaos all over the hospital. He meets a girl called Lindy who has not spoken since her parents died in an aeroplane accident. Banned from the hospital, Norman is unable to visit Lindy, so he and Mr Grimsdale join the St John Ambulance Brigade, which gives him the opportunity to do so. The usual pandemonium ensues. In the end, Lindy visits him at a charity ball where the St John Ambulance Brigade Band are performing. The ball descends into the inevitable shambles, caused entirely by Norman. However, Norman redeems himself (and the reputation of the Brigade) whose ambulance drove off all by itself, when he addresses those attending the ball and everyone donates money for the charity. The next day, Norman dreams he is back in hospital.

== Cast ==
- Norman Wisdom as Norman Pitkin
- Edward Chapman as Mr Grimsdale
- Jeanette Sterke as Nurse Haskell
- Jerry Desmonde as Sir Hector
- Jill Melford as Lady Brinkley
- Glyn Houston as Corporal Welsh of the St John Ambulance Brigade
- Hazel Hughes as Matron
- Patsy Rowlands as Amy
- Peter Jones as Divisional Officer Russell of the St John Ambulance Brigade
- Ernest Clark as Prof. Crankshaw
- Lucy Appleby as Lindy
- Vera Day as Betty
- Frank Williams as Driver Nuttall of the St John Ambulance Brigade
- Penny Morrell as Nurse Rudkin
- Patrick Cargill as Dr Meadows
- Francis Matthews as Benson
- John Blythe as Dale, press photographer
- Pamela Conway as patient
- Danny Green as Ticehurst
- Johnny Briggs as armed robber
- Michael Goodliffe as doctor on the children's ward (uncredited)
- Tony Thawnton as St John Ambulance Driver (uncredited)
- Pat Coombs as nurse (uncredited)
- Paul Grist as medical student (uncredited)

== Production ==
The film was shot almost entirely at Pinewood Studios in Buckinghamshire. Location filming was kept to a minimum.

Producer Hugh Stewart said it was the most financially successful film he ever made. "We did [James] Bond business with it."

== Release ==
A Stitch in Time represents Wisdom's most commercially successful title. It was among the ten most popular films of the year at the British box office in 1964. Filmink called it "a commercial blockbuster."

The film was rereleased in 1984 in Chennai India; it was a smash hit and ran for many weeks at the old Alankar Theatre (now demolished).

== Critical reception ==
The Monthly Film Bulletin wrote: "This is the Norman Wisdom mixture much as before, though his semi-stuttering hesitancy and the sentimentality are both rather overplayed. The humour is more patchy than in On the Beat, and in the earlier scenes Wisdom tends to make his comedy effects simply by shouting. The slapstick sequences, however – though including the time-honoured dentist's chair farce and the inevitable female impersonation (this time as a nurse) – are inventive and smartly put over."

The Radio Times gave the film two out of five stars, writing: "this was [Wisdom's] final film in black and white and also his last big starring success at the box office, for he belonged to a more innocent age. The script sticks closely to the winning Wisdom formula as he knots his cap in confused shyness in his attempts to declare his love for a pretty nurse. Stalwart stooges Edward Chapman (Mr Grimsdale, of course) and Jerry Desmonde prove once more that straight men can often be much funnier than the comics".

Sky Movies gave the film three out of five stars, noting the film "has just enough inspired tomfoolery – a madcap race on casualty trolleys down the corridors of a hospital; a hectic ride for a bandaged Norman on top of an ambulance; Norman messing up a St John's Ambulance Brigade concert – to ensure a decent quota of laughs. In his silly stunts, he is forever the naughty boy having the time of his life doing what he shouldn't".

Leslie Halliwell said: "Thin star slapstick."

TV Guide gave the film three out of five stars, and noted, "a charming and sentimental piece of characterization from Wisdom."
