= Robert Asher (director) =

British film and television director (1915–1979)

Robert Asher (1915 – 1979) was a British film and television director, the brother of British cinematographer Jack Asher.

Robert Asher began his career as an assistant director in 1934, working with Anthony Pelissier, Robert Hamer, Maurice Elvey and Roy Ward Baker among others. During World War II he worked on such films as When We Are Married (1943), Medal for the General (1944) and Waltz Time (1945).

Asher became a solo director with the Norman Wisdom vehicle Follow a Star (1959). He followed John Paddy Carstairs as the overseer of the Wisdom films, concluding with Press for Time (1966). The Morecambe and Wise film The Intelligence Men (1965), Wisdom's The Early Bird (also 1965) and the crime caper farce Make Mine Mink (1960) are among his other credits.

In the late 1960s, Asher began working in television, directing episodes of ITC Entertainment productions including The Baron, The Champions, The Saint, The Prisoner and The Avengers.

== Filmography ==
- Follow a Star (1959)
- Make Mine Mink (1960)
- The Bulldog Breed (1960)
- She'll Have to Go (1962)
- On the Beat (1962)
- A Stitch in Time (1963)
- The Intelligence Men (1965)
- The Early Bird (1965)
- Press for Time (1966)
