= On the Beat (1962 film) =

1962 British film by Robert Asher

- Theatrical release poster
- Directed by: Robert Asher
- Screenplay by: John McKimson; Norman Wisdom; Eddie Leslie
- Produced by: Hugh Stewart
- Starring: Norman Wisdom; Jennifer Jayne; Raymond Huntley
- Cinematography: Geoffrey Faithfull
- Edited by: Bill Lewthwaite
- Music by: Philip Green
- Production company: Rank Organisation
- Distributed by: Rank Film Distributors; United Artists (US)
- Release date: 11 December 1962
- Running time: 106 minutes
- Country: United Kingdom
- Language: English

On the Beat is a 1962 British comedy film directed by Robert Asher and starring Norman Wisdom, Jennifer Jayne and Raymond Huntley. It was written by John McKimson, Wisdom and Eddie Leslie.

== Plot ==
Norman Pitkin works at Scotland Yard as a car cleaner, but dreams of becoming a policeman as his late father was. The police reject his request to join the force, but later recruit him to work undercover in disguise. He has turned out to be the doppelganger of a suspected jewel thief, an Italian crime boss in London. In addition to his criminal activities, this man is a ladies' hairdresser.

Norman disguises himself as the suspect and gains entry to his salon. Once inside, after some inevitable mishaps, he manages to find the stolen goods, knock out the suspect, wrap him up in a curtain/wall rug, and bring him to justice.

As a reward, he is offered a permanent position in the police and marries his love, the ex-girlfriend of the man he brought to justice, whom he had rescued earlier when she attempted suicide by jumping in the river.

== Cast ==
- Norman Wisdom as Norman Pitkin/Giulio Napolitani
- Jennifer Jayne as Rosanna
- Raymond Huntley as Sir Ronald Ackroyd
- David Lodge as Superintendent Cecil Hobson
- Esma Cannon as Mrs. Stammers
- Eric Barker as doctor
- Eleanor Summerfield as Sergeant Wilkins
- Ronnie Stevens as Oberon
- Terence Alexander as Chief Superintendent Belcher
- Maurice Kaufmann as Vince
- Dilys Laye as American lady
- George Pastell as Manzini
- Jack Watson as Police Sergeant
- Campbell Singer as Bollington
- Lionel Murton as man in underground train
- Robert Rietti as Italian lawyer
- Marjie Lawrence as crying lady
- Peggy Ann Clifford as Giulio's mother
- Jean Aubrey as Lady Hinchingford
- Monte Landis as Mr. Bassett
- Mario Fabrizi as newspaper seller
- Alfred Burke as Trigger O'Flynn
- John Blythe as chauffeur (uncredited)
- Cyril Chamberlain as cafe proprietor (uncredited)
- Tutte Lemkow as billposter in Underground (uncredited)
- Larry Martyn as yob in cafe (uncredited)
- Julian Orchard as wedding photographer (uncredited)
- Anita Sharp-Bolster as hair-salon customer (uncredited)
- Alister Williamson as detective (uncredited)

== Production ==
On the Beat was shot at Pinewood Studios and on location around Windsor. The film's sets were designed by the art director Bert Davey. It marked a return to Rank for Wisdom following two films for United Artists, although the latter handled the film for distribution in North America. Producer Hugh Stewart said "I thought it was a very good film."

== Reception ==
=== Box Office ===
The film was one of the 12 most popular movies at the British box office in 1963.

=== Critical ===
The Monthly Film Bulletin wrote: "Chaplin has said that 'Comedy is life viewed from a distance, tragedy, life in close-up'. This is a comedy which mistakes distance for over-simplification: a world where policemen, cockneys, hairdressers and landladies behave as though born in a uniform, indoctrinated from infancy with a set of clichés and mannerisms. Like Chaplin, Norman Wisdom is small and helpless in a bullying world, but he solicits our pity where Chaplin would enlist our sympathy. His final success strips him of any attraction: a man who brings his superiors down to his own cloying level, and deserts his bride at the sound of a police whistle."

Leslie Halliwell said: "Busy but flat comedy vehicle, never very likeable."

== Music ==
A slightly different arrangement of the film's title theme, by composer Philip Green, was recorded for a production music library, and may be heard in many American animated cartoons of the early 1960s, particularly those from Hanna-Barbera Productions.
