= We're Going to Hang out the Washing on the Siegfried Line =

Song
- Published: 1939
- Genre: Second World War song
- Composer: Michael Carr
- Lyricist: Jimmy Kennedy

"We're Going to Hang out the Washing on the Siegfried Line" is a popular song by Irish songwriter Jimmy Kennedy, written whilst he was a Captain in the British Expeditionary Force during the early stages of the Second World War, with music by Michael Carr. It was first published in 1939.

== Background and composition ==
The Siegfried Line was a chain of fortifications along Germany's Western border, analogous to the Maginot Line in France.

At the first big wartime variety concert organized by ENSA, which was broadcast by the BBC from RAF Hendon in north London on 17 October 1939, Adelaide Hall performed the song accompanied by Mantovani and his orchestra. A rare newsreel of this concert exists, and the footage is thought to be the earliest surviving film of a performer singing the song.

It began:

We're going to hang out the washing on the Siegfried Line.
Have you any dirty washing, mother dear?
We're gonna hang out the washing on the Siegfried Line.
'Cause the washing day is here.

Leslie Sarony (1897–1985) and Leslie Holmes added some possibly unofficial lines. The Sarony and Holmes version put "Mother dear, I'm writing you from somewhere in France" at the start and then, after the main section, added four lines starting "Everybody's mucking in and doing their job".. The song was also translated in French by Paul Misraki and sung by Ray Ventura.

The song was recorded by many British musicians during the Second World War, including Arthur Askey, Flanagan and Allen, and Vera Lynn.

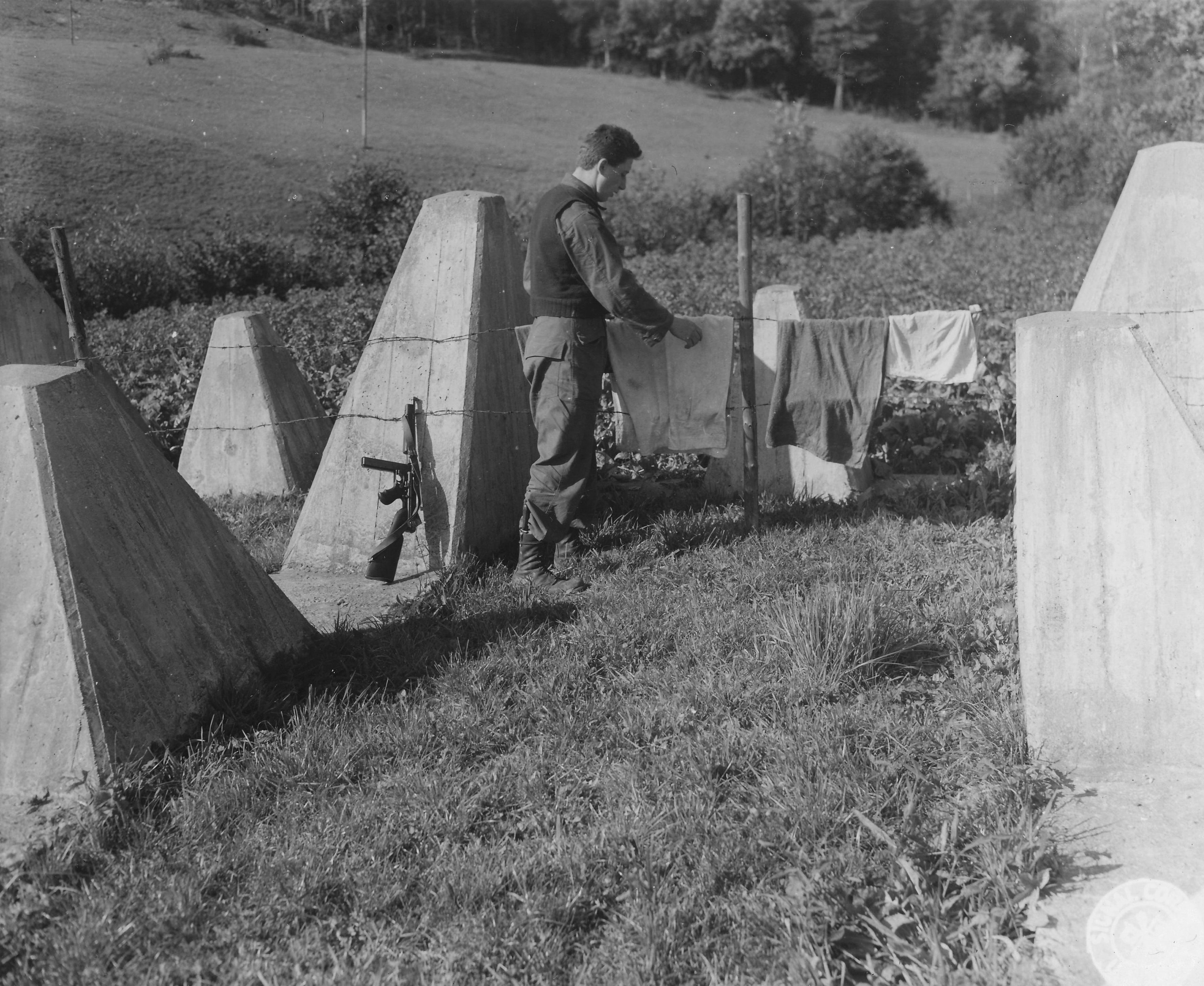
The Allies did not conquer the Siegfried Line until 1945. US Army Signal Corps Photo.

== Parody ==
A mocking parody was written shortly after the Battle of France by a German songwriter, with lines that include (in translation):

Yeah, my boy, you thought it would be so easy
At the great Washing Day on the German Rhine.
Oh, and you really filled your trousers, didn't you?
And when the German Washing Day is over,
Man, you won't need any more washing.
