= The Wreck of the Nancy Lee =

Song by Arthur Le Clerq

Song
- Released: 1932

"The Wreck of the Nancy Lee" (1931) is a comic song, words and music by Arthur Le Clerq. Sheet music published in London in 1932 billed it as "He Played his Ukulele as the Ship Went Down: a comedy foxtrot". It has been recorded by Clinton Ford, Fred And Leslie Gilbert (Comedians), and in March 1932 by Leslie Holmes and by Leslie Sarony.

The chorus is as follows:

'All the crew was in despair,
Some rushed here and others rushed there,
But the Captain sat in the Captain's chair,
And he played his ukulele as the ship went down.'
