= Ken Annakin =

English filmmaker (1914–2009)

Ken Annakin OBE
- Annakin in 1969
- Born: Kenneth Cooper Annakin; 10 August 1914; Beverley, East Riding of Yorkshire, England
- Died: 22 April 2009 (aged 94); Beverly Hills, California, US
- Burial place: Westwood Village Memorial Park Cemetery
- Occupations: Film director, screenwriter, film producer
- Years active: 1941–1992
- Style: Comedies, Adventure comedy, Epic movies, Ensemble cast comedies, Adventure films, Action films
- Spouse: Pauline Carter (m. 1959)
- Children: 2

Kenneth Cooper Annakin, OBE (10 August 1914 – 22 April 2009) was an English filmmaker. His career spanned half a century, beginning in the early 1940s and ending in 1992, and in the 1960s he was noticed by critics with large-scale adventure epic and comedies films, like Swiss Family Robinson, The Longest Day, Those Magnificent Men in Their Flying Machines, Battle of the Bulge, The Biggest Bundle of Them All and Monte Carlo or Bust!. He was an Academy Award and Directors Guild of America Award nominee, and received the Order of the British Empire in 2002.

== Biography ==
Annakin was born in and grew up in Beverley, East Riding of Yorkshire, where he attended the local grammar school. After leaving school he became a trainee income tax inspector in the city of Hull. Annakin subsequently decided to emigrate to New Zealand, and travelled around the world in a variety of jobs.

He was compere and stage manager of Eugene Permanent Waving Company's roadshow, touring the Northern provinces. When World War II broke out, Annakin became a firefighter in Soho, then joined the Royal Air Force.

=== Documentaries ===
Injured in the Liverpool Blitz, Annakin joined the RAF Film Unit, where he worked as a camera operator on propaganda films for the Ministry of Information and the British Council. We Serve (1942), a recruiting film for women, was directed by Carol Reed, who made Annakin his assistant director; Annakin subsequently directed several training films for Verity Films, a group led by Sydney Box, who was soon to become head of Gainsborough Pictures.

His early documentaries included London 1942 (1942), A Ride with Uncle Joe (1943), Make Fruitful the Land (1945), We of the West Riding (1945), English Criminal Justice (1946), It Began on the Clyde (1946) and Fenlands (1946).

=== Feature films and Gainsborough Pictures ===
Annakin had made a number of documentaries for Sydney Box, and when Box took over as head of Gainsborough Pictures he brought Annakin with him and assigned him to his first feature, Holiday Camp (1947). It was a solid hit and launched Annakin's career. Box called in Annakin to replace Michael Chorlton, who was directing Miranda (1948) with Glynis Johns. The resulting film was another success.

Broken Journey (1948) with Phyllis Calvert was a commercial disappointment. However, Quartet (1948), an anthology film based on stories by W. Somerset Maugham, for which Annakin directed one segment, was well received.

Holiday Camp featured the Huggetts, a working-class family living in suburban England headed by Jack Warner and Kathleen Harrison. They were spun off into their own vehicle directed by Annakin, Here Come the Huggetts (1948) with Petula Clark, Jane Hylton, and Susan Shaw as their young daughters, Amy Veness as their grandmother and Diana Dors as their cousin. It was popular and led to Vote for Huggett (1949) and The Huggetts Abroad (1949).

=== Associated British ===
Annakin moved to Associated British Pictures Corporation, for whom he directed Landfall (1949), a war film; and Double Confession (1950), a thriller. He did another installment for an anthology movie based on Maugham stories, Trio (1950).

For producer George Hambley Brown, Anakin did the comedy Hotel Sahara (1951) with Peter Ustinov and Yvonne de Carlo.

=== Walt Disney ===
Annakin then received an offer from Walt Disney to make The Story of Robin Hood and His Merrie Men (1952) with Richard Todd.

He made an action film set during the Malayan Emergency, the United Artists film The Planter's Wife (1952) with Jack Hawkins and Claudette Colbert, which was a big hit in Britain.

Disney reunited Annakin and Todd on The Sword and the Rose (1953), co-starring Glynis Johns; it was a commercial disappointment. Annakin was offered the chance to direct a third historical film with Richard Todd, Rob Roy, but John Davis refused to let him out of his contract with Rank.

Annakin made a comedy, You Know What Sailors Are (1954) then did another imperial adventure story with Hawkins, The Seekers (1954). He arranged for Rank to buy the rights to a Pearl Buck novel The Hidden Flower but then decided not to make it as he felt interracial romance was out of date. He worked on a film set in Burma, Elephant Bill but John Davis of Rank refused to make it as it was too expensive.

He returned to comedy for Value for Money (1955) with John Gregson and Diana Dors, for Rank; Loser Takes All (1956) with Johns, based on a script by Graham Greene, for British Lion Films. He was going to direct The Alcock and Brown Story for Alex Korda starring Kenneth More but the film was cancelled when Korda went bankrupt. He was going to direct The Singer Not the Song with Marlon Brando and Peter Finch but pulled out when they were unable to raise finance and John Davis insisted Dirk Bogarde be cast. He directed Three Men in a Boat (1956) with Laurence Harvey and Jimmy Edwards for Romulus Films. Three Men in a Boat was especially popular.

Annakin made Across the Bridge (1957) with Rod Steiger from a story by Graham Greene. This would be Annakin's favourite film.

He was going to direct The Singer Not the Song but was unhappy with the idea of making the film with Dirk Bogarde. Instead he travelled to South Africa to make another adventure story, Nor the Moon by Night (1958) for Rank, with Michael Craig and Belinda Lee. Around this time he was credited as a writer on Mission in Morocco (1959), though he did not direct it.

Disney called again and hired Annakin to make a mountaineering tale, Third Man on the Mountain (1959). They kept him on for Swiss Family Robinson (1960), which Walt Disney's nephew, Roy, considered "one of the greatest family adventure films of all time and a favourite for generations of moviegoers". It was a huge hit.

Annakin returned to comedy with Very Important Person (1961) with James Robertson Justice. He travelled to South Africa once more for The Hellions (1962) with Richard Todd.

Annakin did some British comedies with Leslie Phillips, Stanley Baxter and a young Julie Christie: The Fast Lady (1962) and Crooks Anonymous (1962).

=== Producer ===
Annakin was hired by Darryl F. Zanuck to direct the British and (uncredited) French and American interior segments in The Longest Day (1962), which was nominated for an Academy Award for Best Picture, eventually losing out to Lawrence of Arabia.

Annakin then made The Informers (1963) with Nigel Patrick for Rank.

June 16, 1965, saw the release of Those Magnificent Men in Their Flying Machines. At the time it was Annakin's most ambitious project, and Zanuck, the head of the 20th Century-Fox Studio, endorsed the British period comedy film. In this project, Annakin co-wrote, produced and directed an international ensemble cast, including Stuart Whitman, Sarah Miles, Robert Morley, Terry-Thomas, James Fox, Red Skelton, Benny Hill, Jean-Pierre Cassel, Gert Fröbe and Alberto Sordi. The story, revolving around the craze of early aviation c. 1910, is about a pompous newspaper magnate (Morley) who is convinced, by his daughter (Miles) and fiancé (Fox), to organize an air race from London to Paris. A large sum of money is offered to the winner, and a variety of characters are drawn to participate. The film received favourable reviews, in which it was described as funny, colourful and clever, and was said to have captured the early enthusiasm for aviation. It was treated as a major production, one of only three full-length 70 mm Todd-AO Fox releases in 1965, with an intermission and musical interlude part of the original screenings. Because of the Todd-AO process, the film was an exclusive roadshow feature, initially shown in deluxe Cinerama venues, where customers needed reserved seats purchased ahead of time. The film grossed $31,111,111 theatrically. Audience reaction both in first release and even today, is nearly universal in assessing the film as one of the "classic" aviation films. For its writing, Annakin and Jack Davies received an Academy Award nomination.

Annakin directed the big-scale war film Battle of the Bulge the same year for producer Philip Yordan and Cinerama. He also started writing a follow-up to Flying Machine called Monte Carlo or Bust.

Annakin planned to make epics about the Spanish Armada, Cortez and the Indian Mutiny, and a film about Martians. None of these were made. Instead, he made The Long Duel (1967) in India for Rank with Yul Brynner, then The Biggest Bundle of Them All (1968) for MGM in Italy.

This was followed by Monte Carlo or Bust (1969) for Paramount Pictures, which Annakin produced and directed from his own script and story. It was an attempt to replicate the success of Those Magnificent Men, but was not as well received.

Annakin continued to travel widely with his films: The Call of the Wild (1972) was shot in Finland, with Charlton Heston; Paper Tiger (1975), with David Niven in Malaysia.

=== Hollywood ===
Thanks to the money made from his films, Annakin moved to the south of France with his family. In 1978, Annakin left France and moved to Los Angeles. According to his autobiography, this was due to running afoul of criminals while attempting to get funding for a new project, who threatened his family.

There he made a series of films for TV: Murder at the Mardi Gras (1978), The Pirate (1978) from a novel by Harold Robbins and Institute for Revenge (1979). He wouldn't stay only in America, as he travelled to Europe for The Fifth Musketeer (1979). Cheaper to Keep Her (1981) and then Australia for the musical The Pirate Movie (1982). Annakin's last completed film was The New Adventures of Pippi Longstocking (1988) which he directed, produced and co wrote.

Annakin would continue to work on more screenplays, as well as attempt to develop a new film about Amelia Earhardt called Redwing. His 1992 project, the historical drama Genghis Khan was not completed, as the company financing it went bust.

=== Autobiography ===
In 2001 Annakin released his autobiography So You Wanna Be A Director? with forewords by Richard Attenborough and Mike Leigh. In its review, the Directors Guild of America stated "So You Wanna Be a Director? is an entertaining autobiography through which seasoned directors and aspirants alike can enjoy and learn from a man with such a versatile and long-lived career. If Annakin tells of his exasperation over trying to coax performances out of producers' girlfriends, the bad behaviour – and sometimes the drug problems – of certain stars and the vagaries of international film financing, he's providing tales that are as cautionary today as when he lived them".

== Honours ==
Annakin was honored as a Disney Legend by The Walt Disney Company in March 2002, only the second film director to be so honoured. He was awarded an OBE the same year for service to the film industry and received an honorary Doctor of Letters degree from Hull University.

== Death ==
He died on 22 April 2009, the same day as Jack Cardiff, who had been his cinematographer on The Fifth Musketeer (1979). The cause of death was myocardial infarction and stroke. A daughter from a previous marriage predeceased him.

== In popular culture ==
Annakin was rumored to have been the inspiration for the name of Anakin Skywalker, a central character in the Star Wars films. However, Star Wars creator George Lucas denied this in a statement published shortly after Annakin's death.

== Filmography ==
=== Feature films ===
Year	Title	Studio/Distributor	Other notes
1947	Holiday Camp	Gainsborough Pictures	
1948	Miranda	Gainsborough Pictures	
1948	Broken Journey	Gainsborough Pictures	
1948	Quartet	Gainsborough Pictures	Segment: "The Colonel's Lady"
1948	Here Come the Huggetts	Gainsborough Pictures	
1949	Vote for Huggett	Gainsborough Pictures	
1949	The Huggetts Abroad	Gainsborough Pictures	
1949	Landfall	Associated British	
1950	Double Confession	Associated British	
1950	Trio	Gainsborough Pictures	Segment: "The Verger" and "Mr Know-All"
1951	Hotel Sahara	Rank Organisation	
1952	The Planter's Wife	Rank Organisation	
1952	The Story of Robin Hood and His Merrie Men	Walt Disney Pictures	
1953	The Sword and the Rose	Walt Disney Pictures	
1954	You Know What Sailors Are	Rank Organisation	
1954	The Seekers	Rank Organisation	
1955	Value for Money	Rank Organisation	
1956	Loser Takes All	British Lion Films	
1956	Three Men in a Boat	Romulus Films	
1957	Across the Bridge	Rank Organisation	
1958	Nor the Moon by Night	Rank Organisation	
1959	Third Man on the Mountain	Walt Disney Pictures	
1960	Swiss Family Robinson	Walt Disney Pictures	
1961	Very Important Person	Rank Organisation	
1961	The Hellions	Columbia Pictures	
1962	Crooks Anonymous	Anglo-Amalgamated	
1962	The Fast Lady	Rank Organisation	
1962	The Longest Day	20th Century-Fox	
1963	The Informers	Rank Organisation	
1965	Those Magnificent Men in Their Flying Machines	20th Century Fox	Also writer
1965	Battle of the Bulge	Warner Bros. Pictures	
1967	The Long Duel	Rank Organisation	Also producer
1968	The Biggest Bundle of Them All	Metro-Goldwyn-Mayer	
1969	Monte Carlo or Bust!	Paramount Pictures	Also writer and producer
1972	The Call of the Wild	Anglo-EMI	
1975	Paper Tiger	Fox-Rank	
1979	The Fifth Musketeer	Columbia Pictures	
1981	Cheaper to Keep Her	American Cinema Productions	
1982	The Pirate Movie	20th Century Fox	
1988	The New Adventures of Pippi Longstocking	Columbia Pictures	Also writer and producer
TBD	Genghis Khan	International Cinema CO	Unfinished

=== Short films ===
Year	Title	Other notes
1943	London 1942	
1943	A Ride with Uncle Joe	
1945	Make Fruitful the Land	
1945	Fenlands	Also writer and producer
1946	We of the West Riding	
1946	It Began on the Clyde	
1946	English Criminal Justice	Also writer

=== Television ===
Year	Title	Network	Notes
1955–63	Walt Disney Presents	ABC	6 episodes
1978	The Pirate	CBS	TV movie
1978	Murder at the Mardi Gras	CBS	TV movie
1979	Institute for Revenge	NBC	TV movie

== Awards and nominations ==
Institution	Year	Category	Work	Result
Academy Awards	1966	Best Original Screenplay	Those Magnificent Men in Their Flying Machines	Nominated
Directors Guild of America	1963	Outstanding Directorial Achievement in Theatrical Feature Film	The Longest Day	Nominated
Golden Raspberry Awards	1983	Worst Director	The Pirate Movie	Won (Note: Tied with Terence Young for Inchon (1981).)
Karlovy Vary International Film Festival	1957	Crystal Globe	Three Men in a Boat	Nominated

== Bibliography ==
- Annakin, Ken (2001). So you wanna be a director?. Tomahawk Press. ISBN 9780953192656.
