= Solid! Said the Earl =

1948 novel

- First edition
- Author: John Paddy Carstairs
- Language: English
- Genre: Comedy
- Publisher: Hurst and Blackett
- Publication date: 1948
- Publication place: United Kingdom
- Media type: Print

Solid! Said the Earl is a 1948 comedy novel by the British writer John Paddy Carstairs, best known as a screenwriter and film director. An American serviceman unexpectedly inherits an English title and country estate.

== Film adaptation ==
In 1955 it was made into the film A Yank in Ermine directed by Gordon Parry and starring Noelle Middleton and Diana Decker, with Carstairs adapting his own novel.

== Bibliography ==
- Goble, Alan. The Complete Index to Literary Sources in Film. Walter de Gruyter, 1999.
