= Jay Lewis (director) =

British film director and screenwriter (1914–1969)

- Born: Jay Gardner Lewis; 1914; Warwickshire, England, United Kingdom
- Died: 4 June 1969 (aged 54–55)
- Occupations: Film director; film producer; screenwriter; film company co-founder

Jay Gardner Lewis (1914 – June 4, 1969) was a British film director, producer and writer.

Starting in the theatre, he joined British International Pictures in 1933. In 1940, he founded the documentary film company Verity Films with Sydney Box. He joined the Army Kinematograph Service in 1942, and subsequently began his feature film career with A Man's Affair (1949), using a crew mainly comprising ex-servicemen.

He was married to actress Thelma Ruby.

== Filmography ==
- Crime Doesn't Pay (short, c.1935)
- Cooking Hints No.1: Oatmeal Porridge (Ministry of Information (MOI) short, 1940), director
- Cooking Hints No.2: Herrings (MOI short, 1940), director
- Cooking Hints No.3: Potatoes (MOI, short, (1940), director
- Cooking Hints: Steaming (MOI short, 1940), director
- Cooking hints: Casserole Cooking (MOI short, 1940)
- Liitle White Lies (short, 1940), director
- Queen's Messengers (MOI short, 1941), director, producer
- Canteen on Wheels (short, 1941), director
- The Soldier's Food (short, 1941), director
- A-tish-oo! (MOI short, 1941), co-director, producer
- The Roots of Victory (short, 1941), director
- Sea Cadets (short, 1941), director
- Y.M.C.A. on Wheels (short, 1942), director
- Knights of St. John (short, 1942), director
- A Man's Affair (1949), director, writer, producer
- Morning Departure (1950), producer
- Front Page Story (1954), writer, producer
- The Baby and the Battleship (1956), director
- Invasion Quartet (1961), director
- Live Now, Pay Later (1962), director
- A Home of Your Own (1964), director, writer
