= A Man's Affair =

1949 film by Jay Lewis

- Directed by: Jay Lewis
- Written by: Jay Lewis; Harold Stewart
- Produced by: Jay Lewis
- Starring: Hamish Menzies; Cliff Gordon; Diana Decker
- Cinematography: Norman Johnson; Douglas Ransom
- Edited by: Francis Edge
- Music by: John Bath
- Production company: Concord Productions
- Distributed by: Exclusive Films
- Release date: 1949
- Running time: 62 minutes
- Country: United Kingdom
- Language: English

A Man's Affair is a 1949 British second feature ('B') comedy film directed by Jay Lewis and starring Hamish Menzies, Cliff Gordon and Diana Decker. It was written by Lewis and Harold Stewart, and made by Exclusive Films. Both Lewis and most of his crew were former members of the Army Kinematograph Service.

The film portrays a pair of coal miners who meet two holidaying girls in the Kent resort of Ramsgate.

== Plot ==
Young colliery workers Jim and Ted meet two girls, Sheila and Phyl, on holiday at the seaside. When spiv Leonard tries to gain the affections of the girls, the couples quarrel, but are later reconciled.

== Cast ==
- Hamish Menzies as Jim
- Cliff Gordon as Ted
- Diana Decker as Sheila
- Joan Dowling as Joan
- Wallas Eaton as Leonard
- Joyce Linden as Phyl
- Toke Townley as Mike
- Verne Morgan as Sidney
- D.L. Davies as Evan Davies
- Malcolm Thomas as Joe Davies
- Jack Vyvian as George
- Farnham Baxter as Herbert
- David Keir as Curly
- Peter Lewis as Ernie
- Pat Nye as Mrs. Mustard

== Reception ==
The Monthly Film Bulletin wrote: "This rather naive story does not offer very much scope to any of the participants. Within these limits, however, the film is well produced, there are some artlessly amusing sequences and the six main characters do their best with the unpretentious material at their command."

Kine Weekly wrote: Unpretentious romantic comedy drama, staged at Ramsgate and lightly tinged with propaganda. It turns on the chequered love affair of a young coal miner and a pretty typist and makes a mild assault on social barriers. A little too ingenuous to bring more men to the pits, it is, nevertheless, agreeable light entertainment. ... Hamish Menzies and Diana Decker are natural and likeable as Jim and Sheila, and the support, which includes Joan (No Room af the Inn) Dowling, is adequate. ... The love story is a trifle novelettish and the mining sequences are not particularly instructive or thrilling, but the leading characters please and, while doing the rounds of Ramsgate, create a happy holiday spirit. As a comedy drama it's a jolly boost for Kent's most colourful seaside resort."

Picture Show wrote: "Simple, pleasant mixture of romance and comedy ... It has no particular thrills or excitement, but it is a happy, pleasant picture, agreeably acted."

== Bibliography ==
- Palmer, Scott. British Film Actors' Credits, 1895-1987. McFarland, 1998.
