= Secret History (TV series) =

- Country of origin: United Kingdom
- Original language: English

Original release
- Network: Channel 4
- Release: 14 November 1991

Secret History is a long-running British television documentary series. Shown on Channel 4, the Secret History brandname is still used as a banner title in the UK, but many of the individual documentaries can still be found on US cable channels without the branding. It can be seen as Channel 4's answer to the BBC's Timewatch. The series returned to Channel 4 on 10 November 2013 after a nine-year break.

== Production ==
According to Channel 4, Secret History is the home of single, hour-long history documentaries that shed new light on some of the most intriguing stories from the past. New evidence from excavation, research, and investigation reveal strange, forgotten stories and shed new light on the events we thought we knew well. The programmes challenge accepted views of key events in history. Sometimes concealed, sometimes manipulated by the media, the truth has been submerged behind the headlines and the propaganda. From Roman legions to Nazi television, the series re-examined contemporary evidence, focusing on often shocking first-hand accounts and the ground-breaking views of leading experts.

In 1992, the show won the Royal Television Society award for Best Documentary Series.

== Episodes ==
Titles are linked to the main subject of each programme, where possible.

=== Series 1 ===
- "The Hidden Hand" (14 November 1991)
- "Unquiet Graves" (21 November 1991)
- "Ratlines" (28 November 1991)
- "Bloody Sunday" (5 December 1991)
- "Murder in Mississippi" (12 December 1991)
- "Prisoners of Propaganda" (19 December 1991)

=== Series 2 ===
- "Deep Sleep" (29 June 1992)
- "Birds of Death" (6 July 1992)
- "Drowning by Bullets" (13 July 1992)
- "The Last Days of Aldo Moro" (20 July 1992)
- "The Hidden Holocaust" (27 July 1992)
- "Death of a Democrat" (3 August 1992)
- "Bad Blood" (10 August 1992)
- "The Robert Kennedy Assassination" (17 August 1992)

=== Series 3 ===
- "The Soviet Wives Affair" (20 January 1994)
- "White Lies" (27 January 1994)
- "The Dambusters Raid" (3 February 1994)
- "Dead or Alive?" (10 February 1994)
- "The Lynchburg Story" (17 February 1994)
- "Suicide Island" (24 February 1994)

=== Special ===
- "The Roswell Incident" (28 August 1995)

=== Series 4 ===
- "The Battle of Goose Green" (11 July 1996)
- "The Whitechapel Murders" (25 July 1996)
- "The Voyage of the St. Louis" (1 August 1996)
- "Mutiny in the RAF" (8 August 1996)
- "Harold Wilson – the Final Days" (15 August 1996)
- "Konkordski" (22 August 1996)
- "Hello Mr President" (21 January 1997)

=== Series 5 ===
- "Lords of the Underworld" (23 June 1997)
- "The Tragedy of HMS Glorious" (30 June 1997)
- "Breaking the Sound Barrier" (7 July 1997)
- "Gold Fever" (14 July 1997)
- "Spying for Love" (21 July 1997)

Specials – Indian Summer season

- "The Forgotten Famine" (12 August 1997)
- "The Cawnpore Massacres" (14 August 1997)
- "Bloody Partition" (25 August 1997)

=== Series 6 ===
- "The Voyage of the Exodus" (11 May 1998)
- "The Porn King, the Stripper and the Bent Coppers" (18 May 1998)
- "The Chair" (1 June 1998)
- "Dad's Army" (8 June 1998)
- "Killer Flu" (15 June 1998)
- "The Berlin Airlift" (29 June 1998)
- "Purple Secret – In Search of Royal Madness" (6 July 1998)
- "Winter of Discontent" (13 July 1998)
- "Witch Hunt" (20 July 1998)
- "D-Day Disaster" (27 July 1998)
- "Kinsey's Paedophiles" (10 August 1998)

=== Series 7 ===
- "The Great Train Robbery" (10 August 1999)
- "The Hidden Jews of Berlin" (17 August 1999)
- "Hitler's Search for the Holy Grail" (19 August 1999)
- "Mau Mau" (24 August 1999)
- "The People's Duchess" (31 August 1999)
- "Sex and the Swastika" (7 September 1999)
- "Bunny Girls" (14 September 1999)
- "Miracle on the River Kwai" (21 September 1999)
- "The Great Fog" (28 September 1999)
- "Execution at Camp 21" (5 October 1999)

=== Special ===
- "The Few" (25 July 2000)

=== Series 8 ===
- "The Duchess and the Headless Man" (10 August 2000)
- "Funny Money" (17 August 2000)
- "Last Train from Budapest" (24 August 2000)
- "Prisoners of the Kaiser" (31 August 2000)
- "Mutiny – The True Story of the Red October" (7 September 2000)
- "Natural Born Americans" (14 September 2000)
- "Children of the Iron Lung" (21 September 2000)

=== Series 9 ===
- "Orphans of the Airlift" (9 August 2001)
- "The Search for the Struma" (16 August 2001)
- "The Lost Legions of Varus" (23 August 2001)
- "Television in the Third Reich" (30 August 2001)
- "Wartime Crime" (6 September 2001)
- "Spanish Armada" (13 September 2001)
- "The Falklands – Exocet!" (5 January 2002)

=== Series 10 ===
- "Charge of the Light Brigade" (6 June 2002)
- "The Comet Cover-Up" (13 June 2002)
- "Witchfinder General" (20 June 2002)
- "Magic at War" (27 June 2002)

First World War sub-series:

- "The Crucified Soldier" (4 July 2002)
- "The War That Made the Nazis" (11 July 2002)
- "Horror on the Home Front" (18 July 2002)
- "Dogfight – The Mystery of The Red Baron" (25 July 2002)

=== Series 11 ===
- "Brighton Bomb" (15 May 2003)
- "Hitler of the Andes" (22 May 2003)
- "Costa del Crime" (29 May 2003)
- "The Affair" (5 June 2003)
- "The Strangest Viking" (12 June 2003)
- "The Nazi Officer's Wife" (19 June 2003)

Specials

- "Brinks Mat – The Greatest Heist Part 1" (24 November 2003)
- "Brinks Mat – The Greatest Heist Part 2" (1 December 2003)
- "Who Kidnapped Shergar?" (18 March 2004)

=== Series 12 ===
- "Beasts of the Roman Games" (7 June 2004)
- "Britain's Boy Soldiers" (14 June 2004)
- "The Royal Mummy" (21 June 2004)
- "Sex Bomb" (28 June 2004)
- "Sink the Belgrano" (5 July 2004)
- "The Nazi Expedition" (12 July 2004)

=== Series 13 ===
- "The Mystery of the Burnt Mummy" (10 November 2013)
- "Queen Victoria and the Crippled Kaiser" (17 November 2013)
- "Finding Babylon's Hanging Garden" (24 November 2013)
- "New Secrets of the Terracotta Warriors" (8 December 2013)
- "The Dambusters' Great Escape" (30 March 2014)
- "Return of the Black Death" (6 April 2014)

=== Series 14 ===
- "The Real Noah's Ark" (14 September 2014)
- "Hitler's Hidden Drug Habit" (19 October 2014)
- "WW1's Forgotten Heroes" (2 November 2014)
- "The Great Wall of China – The Hidden Story" (30 November 2014)

=== Series 15 ===
- "London's Lost Graveyard – The Crossrail Discovery" (19 July 2015)
- "Prince Philip – the Plot to Make a King" (30 July 2015)
- "Hunt for the Arctic Ghost Ship" (4 August 2015)
- "The Other Prince William" (27 August 2015)
- "First Humans – The Cave Discovery" (27 September 2015)
- "Cleopatra's Lost Tomb" (4 October 2015)
- "China – Treasures of the Jade Empire" (18 October 2015)
- "Sex Change Spitfire Ace" (24 October 2015)
- "Britain's Medieval Vampires" (31 October 2015 More4)

=== Series 16 ===
- "Shakespeare's Tomb" (26 March 2016)
- "The Mystery of the Crossrail Skulls" (24 April 2016)
- "Jutland – WW1's Greatest Sea Battle" (21 May 2016)
- "Messages Home – Lost Films of the British Army" (26 June 2016)
- "China's Forgotten Emperor" (3 July 2016)
- "Saddam Goes to Hollywood" (24 July 2016)
- "Heroes of Helmand – The British Army's Greatest Escape" (16 August 2016)
- "Secrets of a Police Marksman" (18 August 2016)
- "The Good Terrorist" (27 August 2016)
- "The Last Heroes of the Somme" (13 November 2016)
- "Pearl Harbor – The New Evidence" (10 December 2016)
- "Titanic – The New Evidence" (1 January 2017)

=== Series 17 ===
- "Dunkirk – The New Evidence" (2 July 2017)
- "Secrets of China's Forbidden City" (9 July 2017)
- "Egypt's Great Pyramid – The New Evidence" (23 September 2017)
- "Britain's Forgotten Army" (12 November 2017)
- "Holocaust – The Revenge Plot" (27 January 2018)
- "Lost Cities of the Maya – Revealed" (11 February 2018)
- "The First Brit – Secrets of the 10,000 Year Old Man" (18 February 2018)
- "Hannibal's Elephant Army – The New Evidence" (25 February 2018)
- "Churchill's Secret Affair" (4 March 2018)
- "Jesus' Female Disciples" (8 April 2018)

=== Series 18 ===
- "Skeletons of the Mary Rose – The New Evidence" (7 September 2019)

== Home video releases ==
The Whitechapel Murders was released on PAL VHS by Channel 4 Video in 1996, and later re-issued as part of the Marshall Cavendish Murder in Mind part-work, with accompanying magazine. The Dambusters Raid was released as a region-free NTSC DVD by Delta Music in 2002, and reissued several times subsequently. Prince Philip – the Plot to Make a King was released on DVD by IMC Vision in 2017, with accompanying magazine. PBS released Killer Flu following its screening under their Secrets of the Dead banner, and Dogfight – The Mystery of The Red Baron under the title Who Killed the Red Baron? after it was screened in its Nova series.

== See also ==
- List of Equinox episodes
