= LeClerq =

LeClerq is a surname. Notable people with the surname include:

- Sophie-Anne Leclerq, a fictional character in the True Blood television drama series
- Hugo Pierre Leclercq, French DJ and music producer better known by his stage name, Madeon

== See also ==
- Arthur Le Clerq, British songwriter
