= When You Come Home =

1948 British film by John Baxter

- Original British quad poster
- Directed by: John Baxter
- Written by: Frank Randle; Geoffrey Orme; David Evans
- Produced by: John Baxter
- Starring: Frank Randle; Leslie Sarony; Leslie Holmes; Diana Decker
- Cinematography: Geoffrey Faithfull
- Edited by: Ted Richards
- Music by: Percival Mackey
- Production company: Butcher's Film Service
- Distributed by: Butcher's Film Service
- Release date: 1948
- Running time: 97 minutes
- Country: United Kingdom
- Language: English

When You Come Home is a 1948 British comedy film directed by John Baxter and starring Frank Randle, Leslie Sarony and Leslie Holmes.

== Plot ==
When the music hall where he works is threatened with closure, a handyman organises an effort to save it.

== Cast ==
- Frank Randle as Frank
- Leslie Sarony as Maestro
- Leslie Holmes as Fingers
- Diana Decker as Paula Ryngelbaum
- Fred Conyngham as Mike O'Flaherty
- Jack Melford as Doctor Dormer Franklyn
- Linda Parker as singer
- Lily Lapidus as Mrs. Ryngelbaum
- Tony Heaton as Joshua Ryngelbaum
- Hilda Bayley as Lady Langfield
- Lesley Osmond as Delia
- Gus Aubrey as designer
- Ernest Dale as fireman
- Rene Sibley-Grant as Mrs. Randle

== Production ==
The film had a larger production budget than Randle's previous films, which had been made in Manchester.

== Critical reception ==
Monthly Film Bulletin said "The film runs to an inordinate length and would be vastly improved by the omission of numerous ramifications of plot and superfluous turns which merely hold up the action without contributing to the furtherance of thestory. In an abbreviated version Randle's performance, at present somewhat disjointed, would have a chance to acquire some sort of shape and coherence. The film does at least, however, display his versatility and promise of a definite ability to play "character" parts. In a large supporting cast, Hilda Bayley shines as the owner of the Empire."

Variety wrote "With 40 years experience making pictures, Butchers are convinced that audiences want to laugh. Here they have starred a comedian, unknown to London's West End, whose following elsewhere in Britain exceeds that of any U.S. star. Frank Randall is as indigenous and as British to the North of England as is tripe. Without playing any of the big circuits his last five pictures are reported to have grossed $2,000,000. ... When you Come Home has all the ingredients of a silent comedy. Custard pies hurtle through the air to land smack on the faces of the rich and snooty. Villainy is unmasked, virtue rewarded, and true love comes into its own. It's that simple. ... Everything in the film is sacrificed for laughs. It doesn't stand any chance in high-grade cinemas, but it will do well elsewhere in this country.

The Radio Times Guide to Films gave the film 1/5 stars, writing: "Director John Baxter, once Britain's most uncompromising disciple of social realism, hit his cinematic nadir with this desperate flashback comedy. Rarely able to project his popular music-hall persona into movies, Frank Randle comes across as a colossal bore in this nostalgic wallow as he regales his granddaughter with tall tales from his chequered past. Adding to the torment are the songs. For movie masochists only."

In British Sound Films: The Studio Years 1928–1959 David Quinlan rated the film as "mediocre", writing: "Enormously long and artless comedy with musical turns"
