= A Yank in Ermine =

- Directed by: Gordon Parry
- Written by: John Baines; John Paddy Cartairs
- Based on: Solid! Said the Earl by John Paddy Carstairs
- Produced by: Francis Searle; William J. Gell
- Starring: Peter Thompson; Diana Decker; Jon Pertwee; Edward Chapman
- Cinematography: Arthur Grant
- Edited by: Lito Carruthers
- Music by: Stanley Black
- Production company: William Gell Productions
- Distributed by: Monarch Film Corporation
- Release date: 12 December 1955
- Running time: 85 minutes
- Country: United Kingdom
- Language: English

A Yank in Ermine is a 1955 British comedy film directed by Gordon Parry and starring Peter Thompson, Noelle Middleton, Harold Lloyd Jr. and Diana Decker, and featuring Jon Pertwee and Sid James. It was adapted by John Paddy Carstairs from his 1948 novel Solid! Said the Earl. The film includes the song "Honey, You Can't Love Two", sung by Decker and written by Eddie Pola and George Wyle.

== Plot ==
An American airman inherits from a distant cousin the title of Earl and a house and estate in an English village. Although he is initially reluctant, his fiancé encourages him to accept it, after she hears how much the estate is worth. When he arrives in England with his two buddies, he falls for the daughter of the owner of the neighbouring estate – but she is also engaged to be married.

== Cast ==
- Peter Thompson as Joe Turner
- Noelle Middleton as Angela
- Harold Lloyd Jr. as Butch
- Diana Decker as Gloria
- Jon Pertwee as Slowburn
- Reginald Beckwith as Kimp
- Edward Chapman as Duke of Fontenham
- Richard Wattis as Boone
- Guy Middleton as Bertram
- Harry Locke as Clayton
- Alan Gifford as Col. M'Gurk
- Joanna Gay as Mabel
- Jennifer Jayne as Enid
- Patrick Connor as orderly
- George Woodbridge as landlord
- Alice Bowes as shopkeeper
- Stewart Mitchell as sentry
- John McLaren as corporal
- Sid James as nightclub manager
- George Hilsdon as Alf Lewis
- Aileen Lewis as dancer in nightclub

== Production ==
The film was shot at Beaconsfield Studios and on location around Turville in Buckinghamshire. The film's sets were designed by the art director Ray Simm.

== Critical reception ==
The Monthly Film Bulletin wrote: "Most of the favourite 'country gentry' jokes are paraded in this somewhat moronic comedy and the allegedly witty comments on Anglo-American relations are notably trite and vulgar. The players work hard but to little purpose."

Kine Weekly wrote: "The picture, which moves at brisk pace, securely binds its cracks at both countries with apt American-British sentiment."

In the Radio Times, David Parkinson wrote "What few bright moments there are come from the late Jon Pertwee, who, fittingly, made his film debut in A Yank at Oxford, and Harold Lloyd Jr, the son of the silent screen legend."
