= The Betrayal (1957 film) =

British film by Ernest Morris

- Directed by: Ernest Morris
- Written by: Brian Clemens; Eldon Howard
- Produced by: Edward J. Danziger; Harry Lee Danziger
- Starring: Philip Friend; Diana Decker
- Music by: Leon Young
- Production company: Danziger Productions
- Release date: 1957
- Running time: 82 minutes
- Country: United Kingdom
- Language: English

The Betrayal is a low-budget 1957 British film directed by Ernest Morris and starring Philip Friend and Diana Decker. The screenplay was by Brian Clemens and Eldon Howard.

== Plot ==
Michael McCall is a former World War II pilot who was blinded while imprisoned by the Nazis. While imprisoned he was betrayed by one of his fellow officers. As he is now unable to identify the traitor by sight, McCall is aided in his search by model Janet Hillyer.

== Cast ==
- Philip Friend as Michael McCall
- Diana Decker as Janet Hillyer
- Philip Saville as Bartel
- Peter Bathurst as Inspector Baring
- Peter Burton as Tony Adams
- Ballard Berkeley as Lawson
- Harold Lang as Clay
- John Stuart as War Crimes Commissioner
- Ferdy Mayne as Freddie
- Denis Quilley as Perfume Company Boss

== Critical reception ==
The Monthly Film Bulletin wrote: "There is a promising theme for a Hitchcock thriller here; but no Hitchcock to make it. The result is that there is some rather violent and evident wrenching of the plot to involve the blind man in tight corners and then to extricate him again. The only really interesting point – whether McCall will forgo his revenge when he catches up with Bartel – is muffed by the entry of the police."

Picturegoer wrote: "An involved but believable thriller with convincing acting by Friend and Diana Decker, as a model. It sews up a neat line in fashion and thrills."

Picture Show wrote: "Intriguing romantic melodrama of a Canadian blinded during the war in a prison camp by the treachery of a fellow inmate and who is now determined to have his revenge. Philip Friend is excellent as the blind man and is ably supported by delightful Diana Decker as an attractive model who helps him succeed in his quest."

In British Sound Films: The Studio Years 1928–1959 David Quinlan rated the film as "average", writing: "Almost believable thriller doesn't quite make it."
