= The Soldier's Food =

1941 British film

- Directed by: Jay Lewis
- Starring: Ralph Richardson; Hubert Gregg; Ronald Shiner; Hay Petrie
- Production company: Verity Films
- Release date: 1941
- Running time: 12 minutes
- Country: United Kingdom
- Language: English

The Soldier's Food is a 1941 British black-and-white short dramatised military training film directed by Jay Lewis and starring Ralph Richardson. It was produced by Verity Films and the Army Kinematograph Service for the Royal Army Ordnance Corps.

== Synopsis ==
The film informs service personnel about the importance of the mess, including demonstrations of cooking equipment, and covers the prevention of waste, and the management of surplus food.

== Cast ==
- Ralph Richardson
- Hubert Gregg
- Ronald Shiner
- Hay Petrie

== Home media ==
The film is available as an extra on the DVD Second World War Collection – Dig For Victory The Ministry Of Food And The Battle To Feed Wartime Britain 1940–1944 (Strike Force Entertainment, 2010)
