= Verity Films =

British documentary film production company

Verity Films was a British documentary film production company, founded by Sydney Box and Jay Gardner Lewis in March or May 1940.

== Background ==
The company's initial purpose was to make short propaganda films for the wartime government. Lewis directed Verity's first five films, but fell out with Box over finances and left the company.

Box's former employer Publicity Films helped pay off the £2,000 debt and the company was refloated in 1941. With Lewis gone, Box ran the company alone and found quick success. Turnover during 1942 was £75,000, and after paying salaries of £5,000 to Box and others, Verity still made a £2,000 profit. A January 1943 report in Kinematograph Weekly called Verity "by far the largest documentary film organisation in Great Britain".

By 1944, Verity had absorbed several other documentary producers and had eight to ten production units in the field. It advertised itself in a trade publication as "the largest short film production organisation in Europe, incorporating the Greenpark Unit, Technique Unit and Donald Taylor's new Gryphon Unit". In August 1944, Verity Films became a founding member of the Film Producers' Guild, based at Guild House in Upper St Martin's Lane, which brought together several film production companies. During the war, Verity produced more than 100 films, most of them at the small and badly soundproofed Merton Park Studios in South London, although for some productions, Verity rented Riverside Studios in Hammersmith. Already, by this point, Box had begun to broaden the management of Verity Films. An item in the edition of 7 December 1944 of Kinematograph Weekly noted that A. T. Burlinson had taken over as managing director while Box worked on The Seventh Veil (1945).

Director Gerry O'Hara landed a job as a runner at Verity in 1941 at the age of 17, as he told Wheeler Winston Dixon:

O'Hara: I got a job there at 3 pounds 7/6 a week. I started as a trainee in the script department, because theoretically I was a journalist. But I was just running errands for the script department, carrying film cans and stuff like that. Then Ken Annakin, who became quite famous later on, was a young assistant director there; he sort of took me under his wing, and I switched to being a runner and errand boy in the assistant director's department.

Dixon: So basically you were working on documentaries as an assistant director?

O'Hara: Yes. How to put out a firebomb, and stuff like that. It was a lot of wartime work, of course, and most of it was civil defense stuff, films for hire.

Dixon: Did you work on any films for the GPO, for the General Post Office?

O'Hara: Yes, the Ministry of Information. We did a sort of copy of Carol Reed's [sic] The Next of Kin, called Jigsaw, which was a naval version of how to keep secrets and so forth.

I think at that time I seemed to waver between first and second assistant, which happened a lot. I was still very young then, only about 18 or 19. But it was a great apprenticeship; it was incredible.

Among Box's other wartime hires (in 1944) was a 16-year-old Eric Marquis, who became one of Verity's longest serving employees, and was by the 1960s the company's director.

After the end of the Second World War, Sydney Box moved on to Gainsborough Studios, joining the board in May 1946 and becoming managing director on 1 August 1946. Betty Box also moved to Gainsborough. Despite the departure of the Boxes, Verity Films continued producing documentaries, with directors such as Ken Annakin.

In later years, the documentary director Seafield Head worked for Verity Films.

In January 1949, Verity Films purchased the distribution rights of all three Mayflower Pictures productions, The Beachcomber (1938), Jamaica Inn (1939), and Sidewalks of London (1938), from Paramount Pictures for re-release. The films were distributed theatrically in the United States and Canada for three years, between January 1949 and December 1951.

== Filmography ==
This filmography is a partial list of films produced or co-produced by Verity Films.

Year	Title	Director	Notes
1940	Herring	Jay Lewis	Produced for the Ministry of Food in December 1940.
1940	Oatmeal Porridge	Jay Lewis	Produced for the Ministry of Food in December 1940.
1940	Potatoes	Jay Lewis	Produced for the Ministry of Food in December 1940.
1940	Steaming	Jay Lewis	Produced for the Ministry of Food in December 1940.
1940	Casserole Cooking	Jay Lewis	Produced for the Ministry of Food in December 1940.
1941	A-tish-oo		
1941	Breast Feeding		
1941	Canteen on Wheels	Jay Lewis	A longer, non-theatrical version was produced as Mobile Canteen for the Ministry of Information and Empire Tea Bureau.
1941	Dai Jones	Daniel Birt	Produced for the Ministry of Information.
1941	The English Inn	Muriel Box	
1941	Everybody's Business		
1941	Food Advice Centre		
1941	HM Mine Layer		
1941	Roots of Victory		
1941	Salvage Sense		
1941	Shunter Black's Night Off	Max Munden	
1941	The Sixteen Tasks of Maintaining Motorised Vehicles		
1941	The Soldier's Food	unknown	
1941	Switchover		
1941	Tea is Served		
1941	Telefootlers	John Paddy Carstairs	
1941	Ten Tips for Tackling Tanks		
1941	UXB		About unexploded bombs.
1941	Women at War		
1942	Action		
1942	Ask CAB		
1942	Cookers in the Field		
1942	Cooks		
1942	House		
1942	HMS George V		
1942	Jane Brown Changes Her Job	Harold Cooper	Co-production with Verity-Technique for the Ministry of Labour.
1942	The Job that Fits		Co-production with the Auxiliary Territorial Service
1942	We Serve	Carol Reed	Recruiting film for the Auxiliary Territorial Service. Ken Annakin was assistant director.
1942	WVS	Louise Birt	Produced for the Ministry of Information.
1943	Jigsaw	Henry Cass	Produced for the Admiralty.
1943	London 1942	Ken Annakin	Produced by Greenpark Productions in association with Verity Films. View the digitised film on the TIME/IMAGE site.
1944	Men of Rochdale	Compton Bennett	Produced for the Co-operative Wholesale Society.
1944	Other Men's Lives	Henry Cass	Intended for munitions workers.
1944	You Too Can Catch Malaria		Produced for the army.
1946	English Criminal Justice	Ken Annakin	"I was lucky, in that I got a picture called English Criminal Justice, which really explained the British system of law and gave me a wonderful break."
1968	Time Out of Mind	Eric Marquis	Produced for Roche Products.
