= Arthur Le Clerq =

Arthur William Dudley Henley (5 June 1891 – 4 June 1976), known as Arthur Le Clerq, was a British songwriter from the 1930s, responsible for several, mainly novelty, hits.

Henley was born in Brixton, London. He died in Berkshire in 1976.

His songs included:

- "Is Izzy Azzy Woz?" (1929)
- "The Rocket Bus" (1929) - also known as "Alf's Carpet"
- "He Played His Ukulele as the Ship Went Down" (1931) - recorded by Clinton Ford (also known as "The Wreck of the Nancy Lee"); also recorded by Leslie Sarony.
- "Tan Tan-Tivvy Tally Ho!" (1931) - recorded by George Formby and Billy Cotton
- "Nobody Loves a Fairy When She's Forty" (1934) - recorded by Tessie O'Shea
- "There's Another Trumpet Playing In The Sky" - recorded by Jenny Howard
- " She’s One of the Back Row Girls", broadcast and recorded by Miss Effie Atherton
