= John Laurie =

Scottish actor (1897–1980)

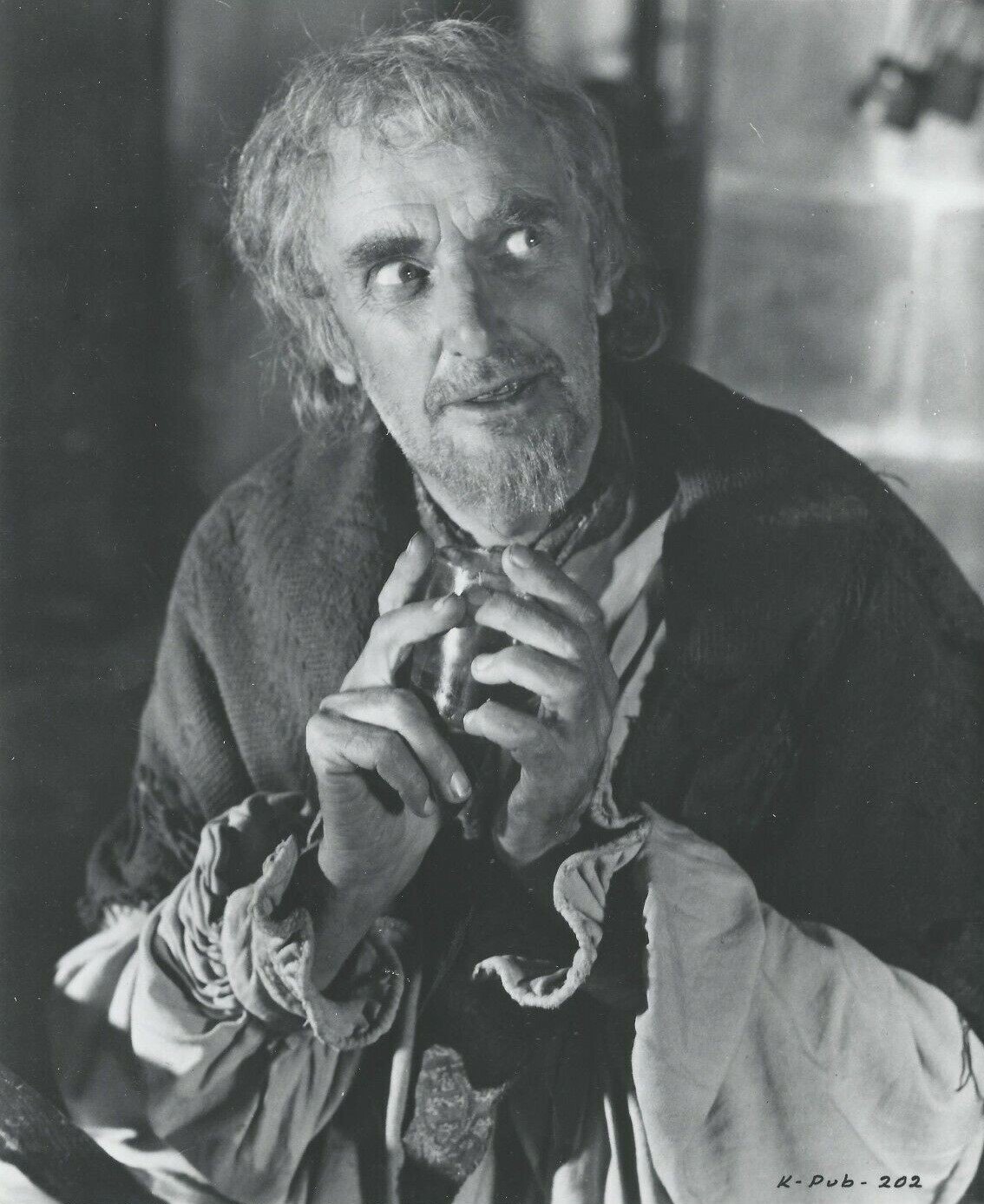
- Laurie in Kidnapped (1960)
- Born: John Paton Laurie; 25 March 1897; Dumfries, Scotland
- Died: 23 June 1980 (aged 83); Chalfont St Peter, Buckinghamshire, England
- Resting place: Cremated; ashes scattered in the English Channel
- Education: Royal Central School of Speech and Drama
- Occupation: Actor
- Years active: 1921–1979
- Spouses: Florence May Saunders (m. 1925; died 1926) Oonah Veronica Todd-Naylor (m. 1928)

John Paton Laurie (25 March 1897 – 23 June 1980) was a Scottish stage, film, and television actor. He appeared in scores of feature films with directors including Alfred Hitchcock, David Lean, Michael Powell and Laurence Olivier, generally playing memorable small or supporting roles. As a stage actor, he was cast in Shakespearean roles and was a speaker of verse, especially of Robert Burns. He is also well known for his role in the sitcom Dad's Army (1968–1977) as Private Frazer, a member of the Home Guard.

== Early life ==
Laurie was born on 25 March 1897 in Dumfries to William Laurie (1856–1903), a clerk in a tweed mill and later a hatter and hosier, and Jessie Ann Laurie (née Brown; 1858–1935). He attended grammar school at Dumfries Academy, then abandoned a career in architecture to serve in the First World War as a member of the Honourable Artillery Company. Upon demobilisation, he trained to become an actor under Elsie Fogerty at the Central School of Speech and Drama, then based at the Royal Albert Hall, London.

== Career ==
=== Theatre and radio ===
Laurie made his debut on stage in 1921.

A prolific Shakespearean actor, Laurie made his first appearance on the London stage in 1922 at the Old Vic, where he played many leading roles. Soon after joining the Old Vic Laurie became involved with the Shakespeare Memorial Theatre in Stratford-upon-Avon where he played such roles as Richard III, Othello and Macbeth. In only his second season at Stratford, Laurie got the chance to play Hamlet, which was almost unheard of for someone with so little experience. Laurie later said that he believed that his performance of the role was the definitive version, saying, "That's the way to play Hamlet, don't wait too long, like some of the boys are doing today."

On radio, Laurie created the role of John the Baptist in Dorothy L Sayers' cycle of plays The Man Born to Be King, and reprised the role in two further versions of the cycle. Laurie also played the part of MacDuff in a radio adaptation of Macbeth, with Ralph Richardson in the title role.

=== TV and film ===
I’ve played every part in Shakespeare. I was considered to be the finest Hamlet of the twenties and I had retired, and now I'm famous for doing this crap.

— John Laurie comment on Dad's Army recalled by Ian Lavender

Laurie's first film was the 1930 film Juno and the Paycock, directed by Alfred Hitchcock. Hitchcock next cast him as John the Crofter in 1935's The 39 Steps, a breakthrough role for Laurie in just his third film. In 1936 Laurie and fellow Old Vic alumnus Laurence Olivier made their first film appearance together in As You Like It. Laurie went on to appear in Olivier's three Shakespearean films, Henry V (1944), Hamlet (1948), and Richard III (1955). During the Second World War Laurie served in the Home Guard, experience that would be useful for later projects. Other roles included Peter Manson in Michael Powell's The Edge of the World (1937), Clive Candy's batman in Powell and Pressburger's The Life and Death of Colonel Blimp (1943), a gardener in Medal for the General (1944), the farmer recruit in The Way Ahead (1944), and the brothel proprietor in Fanny by Gaslight (1944). In the 1945 Powell and Pressburger film I Know Where I'm Going!, he had a small speaking part in a céilidh sequence for which he was also credited as an adviser. In the next decade, he played the psychiatrist Dr. James Garsten in Mine Own Executioner (1947), the repugnant Pew in Disney's Treasure Island (1950), Angus in Pandora and the Flying Dutchman (1951), and Dr. MacFarlane in David Lean's Hobson's Choice (1954).

In 1954, Laurie joined the Edinburgh Gateway Company to play the leading role in Robert Kemp's The Laird o' Grippy, a translation into Scots of Molière's L'avare.

Laurie's role as Private Frazer, the gaunt-faced, intense, pessimistic undertaker, and British Home Guard soldier in the sitcom Dad's Army (1968–1977) remains his best known TV role. Dad's Army co-star Frank Williams noted in his autobiography that Laurie had ‘a sort of love-hate relationship with the show’, as despite earning him a lot a money he felt that a sitcom was beneath him. Said Graham McCann in his book Dad's Army: The Story of a Very British Comedy: "John Laurie was cantankerous, he was rather mischievous, he was someone who enjoyed playing a kind of a professional pessimist." He featured in many British series of the 1950s, 1960s, and 1970s including Tales of Mystery, Doctor Finlay's Casebook, and The Avengers.

Laurie starred as Mad Peter in the Hammer film The Reptile (1966), and later appeared in The Abominable Dr. Phibes (1971), the Disney film One of Our Dinosaurs is Missing (1975), and The Prisoner of Zenda (1979). One of his last appearances was in Return to the Edge of the World (1978), in which Michael Powell revisited his film of forty years earlier. Laurie's final work was in the BBC Radio 2 comedy series Tony's (1979) along with Victor Spinetti and Deborah Watling.

== Personal life ==
Laurie was married twice, first to Florence May Saunders, whom he met while at the Old Vic; she died from meningitis in 1926. His second wife was Oonah Veronica Todd-Naylor, who survived him. Together, they had a daughter, Veronica (1939–2022).

== Death ==
Laurie died on 23 June 1980, aged 83, from emphysema in the Chalfont and Gerrards Cross Hospital, Chalfont St Peter, Buckinghamshire. His body was cremated and his ashes were scattered in the English Channel. His widow, Oonah (1901–1990), died ten years later.

== Filmography ==
Year	Title	Role	Notes
1930	Juno and the Paycock	Johnny Boyle	
1934	Red Ensign	Forsyth	Uncredited
1935	The 39 Steps	John the crofter	
1935	Her Last Affaire	Robb	
1935	Tudor Rose	John Knox	Uncredited
1936	Born That Way	Mc Tavish	
1936	East Meets West	Dr. Fergusson	
1936	As You Like It	Oliver	
1937	The Windmill	Mons. Coutard	
1937	Farewell Again	Private McAllister	
1937	Jericho	Hassan	Also known as Dark Sands
1937	The Edge of the World	Peter Manson	
1937	There Was a Young Man	Stranger	
1938	The Duchess of Malfi	Ferdinand of Aragon	TV
1938	The Claydon Treasure Mystery	Wilson – the Valet	Uncredited
1938	White Secret	MacDonald	TV
1938	A Royal Divorce	Joseph Bonaparte	
1938	The Last Voyage of Captain Grant	Captain Grant	TV
1938	The Ware Case	Henson, the gamekeeper	
1939	Mary Rose	Cameron	TV
1939	Bees on the Boat-Deck	Gaster	TV
1939	Q Planes	Newspaper Editor	Uncredited
1939	The Four Feathers	The Khalifa	
1940	Laugh It Off	Jock	
1940	Convoy	Gates	
1940	Sailors Three	McNab	
1941	The Ghost of St. Michael's	Jamie	
1941	Old Mother Riley's Ghosts	McAdam	
1941	Dangerous Moonlight	Wing Commander	
1942	Ships with Wings	Lt. Comdr. Reid	
1943	The Gentle Sex	Alexander Balfour, Scots corporal	
1943	The Life and Death of Colonel Blimp	Murdoch	
1943	The Demi-Paradise	British Sailor	
1943	The Lamp Still Burns	Mr. Hervey	
1943	The New Lot	Harry Fyfe	Short, uncredited
1944	Fanny by Gaslight	William Hopwood	
1944	The Way Ahead	Private Luke	
1944	Medal for the General	McNab	
1944	Henry V	Jamy	
1944	Men of Rochdale	Mr. Ferguson	Short
1945	The World Owes Me a Living	Matthews	
1945	Great Day	Scottish sergeant	
1945	The Agitator	Tom Tetley	
1945	I Know Where I'm Going!	John Campbell	
1945	Caesar and Cleopatra	1st. Auxiliary Sentinel	
1945	Read All About It	John	Short, uncredited
1946	Gaiety George	MacTavish	
1946	Jeannie	Father	TV
1946	Two Gentlemen of Soho	Sneak	TV
1946	School for Secrets	Dr. Jock McVitie	
1947	The Brothers	Dugald McLeod / Alistair MacDonald	
1947	Jassy	Tom Woodroofe	
1947	Uncle Silas	Giles	
1947	Mine Own Executioner	Dr. James Garsten	
1948	Hamlet	Francisco	
1948	Bonnie Prince Charlie	Blind Jamie	
1949	Floodtide	Joe Drummond	
1950	Madeleine	Scots Divine	Uncredited
1950	Treasure Island	Blind Pew	
1950	Trio	Mr. Campbell	(segment "Sanatorium")
1950	No Trace	Inspector MacDougall	
1951	Pandora and the Flying Dutchman	Angus	
1951	Happy Go Lovely	Jonskill	
1951	Laughter in Paradise	Gordon Webb	
1951	Encore	Andrews, Engineer	(segment "Winter Cruise")
1952	Saturday Island	Grimshaw	
1952	Tread Softly	Angus McDonald	
1952	Too Many Detectives	Edward Potter	Short
1952	Potter of the Yard	Edward Potter	Short
1953	The Great Game	Mac Wells	
1953	Captain Brassbound's Conversion	Rankin	TV
1953	Henry V	Pistol	TV
1953	The Fake	Henry Mason	
1953	Johnny on the Run	Policeman	
1953	Strange Stories	Mr. Bartleby	
1953	Mr Beamish Goes South	Edward Potter	Short
1953	Love in Pawn	McCutcheon	
1954	Hobson's Choice	Dr. McFarlane	
1954	Calling Scotland Yard: The Sable Scarf		Short
1954	Devil Girl from Mars	"Jamie" Jamieson	
1954	The Black Knight	James, the servant	
1954	Destination Milan	Walter McHarry	
1955	Richard III	Lovel	
1956	Festival Fever	Annie's father	TV
1956	A Day of Grace	Uncle Henry	Short
1957	Murder Reported	Mac North – Editor	
1957	Campbell's Kingdom	Mac	
1958	Next to No Time	Abercrombie, Scottish Director	
1958	Rockets Galore!	Capt. MacKechnie	Uncredited
1960	Kidnapped	Ebenezer Balfour	
1961	Don't Bother to Knock	Taxi Driver	
1961	One Way Pendulum	Judge	TV
1963	Siege of the Saxons	Merlin	
1963	Ladies Who Do	Dr. MacGregor	
1964	Eagle Rock	Mr. McTavish	Voice
1966	The Reptile	Mad Peter	
1967	Mister Ten Per Cent	The Scotsman	
1970	Step Laughing Into the Grave		TV
1971	Dad's Army	Private Frazer	
1971	The Abominable Dr. Phibes	Darrow	
1974	Charles Dickens' World of Christmas		TV
1975	One of Our Dinosaurs Is Missing	Jock	
1976	Crime Casebook	George Winterman / Sellens	Short
1979	The Prisoner of Zenda	Archbishop	(final film role)

== Partial television credits ==
Year	Title	Role	Notes
1938	The Duchess Of Malfi	Ferdinand of Aragon	Single drama
1938	The Last Voyage of Captain Grant	Captain Grant	Single drama
1938	Mary Rose	Cameron	Single drama
1939	Bees on the Boat-Deck	Gaster	Single drama
1952	The Three Hostages	Insp. MacGillivray	Four episodes
1961–1963	Tales of Mystery	Host / Algernon Blackwood	29 episodes
1962–1969	The Avengers		Death of a Great Dane; Brief for Murder; A Funny Thing Happened on the Way to the Station; Pandora
1963	Steptoe and Son	The Vet	Episode "Wallah, Wallah Catsmeat"
1965	Z Cars	Dr Ferguson	Episode "Partners"
1965	Emergency-Ward 10	Professor Corliss	Six episodes
1968–1977	Dad's Army	Private Frazer	80 episodes, regular role
1969	The Gnomes of Dulwich	Top Gnome	1 episode
1970	From a Bird's Eye View	Lord McBracken	One episode alongside Dads Army co-star Clive Dunn
1971	Jackanory	Storyteller	Five episodes reading The Princess and the Goblin
1973	Jackanory	Storyteller	Five episodes reading The Princess and Curdie
1975	Jackanory	Storyteller	Five episodes reading stories 'The Light Princess' and 'The Golden Key'
1979	Larry Grayson's Generation Game	Himself	Guest Appearance
