= The Way Ahead =

1944 war film by Carol Reed

- Film poster
- Directed by: Carol Reed
- Written by: Eric Ambler; Peter Ustinov
- Produced by: John Sutro; Norman Walker; Stanley Haynes
- Starring: David Niven; Stanley Holloway; William Hartnell
- Cinematography: Guy Green
- Edited by: Fergus McDonell
- Music by: William Alwyn
- Production company: Two Cities Films
- Distributed by: General Film Distributors
- Release dates: 9 June 1944 (UK); 3 June 1945 (U.S.)
- Running time: 115 min. / 91 min. (US)
- Country: United Kingdom
- Language: English
- Budget: £252,500
- Box office: £183,700

The Way Ahead (also known as Immortal Battalion) (1944) is a British Second World War drama film directed by Carol Reed. The screenplay was written by Eric Ambler and Peter Ustinov. The film stars David Niven, Stanley Holloway and William Hartnell along with an ensemble cast of other British actors, including Ustinov in one of his earliest roles. The Way Ahead follows a group of civilians who are conscripted into the British Army and, after training, are shipped to North Africa where they are involved in a battle against the Afrika Korps.

== Plot ==
In the days after the Dunkirk evacuation in the Second World War, recently commissioned Second Lieutenant Jim Perry, a pre-war Territorial private soldier, is posted to the Duke of Glendon's Light Infantry, known as the "Dogs", to train replacements to fill its depleted ranks. He is joined by Sergeant Ned Fletcher, a veteran of the British Expeditionary Force.

In contrast to Perry, the rest of the squad is shocked to have been conscripted to the army. We're introduced to phlegmatic rent collector Evan Lloyd, along with Lloyd's boastful friend Geoffrey Stainer, loquacious travel agent Sid Beck, heating engineer Ted Brewer working in the Houses of Parliament, department store manager Herbert Davenport, Davenport's young employee Bill Parsons, and Scottish farm labourer Luke.

A mild-mannered officer, Perry patiently does his best to turn the resentful conscripts into soldiers, despite their belief drill sergeant Fletcher is treating them harshly. Despite petty complaints by the men about him, Fletcher tells Perry he's pleased with their development and believes some could be future NCOs. Perry defends Parsons at a court martial for deserting his post, sympathetic to his wife being threatened by debt collectors. Oblivious to Perry's intervention, the other men sabotage a field exercise, deliberately making the battalion look bad to poorly reflect on Perry's command. The men's respect for both Fletcher and Perry grows by the time their training is complete, as they come to understand the reasons for many of the things they've experienced..

The battalion's troopship is torpedoed on the way to Operation Torch in North Africa. Sergeant Fletcher, trapped below deck, is saved by Perry and Private Luke and the survivors are rescued and taken to Gibraltar, where they miss the landings. After arrival in North Africa, the platoon is assigned to guard a small town and Perry appropriates a cafe as battalion headquarters, to the disgust of the pacifist owner, Rispoli. The men develop a fondness for Rispoli over games of darts.

When the Germans attack, Perry and his men fiercely defend their positions, aided by Rispoli. When the Germans approach under a white flag to demand Perry's surrender, he tells the Germans to "Go to Hell" and the British defenders launch a bayonet charge. The film ends with two veteran "Dogs" appreciatively reading about the men's bravery.

== Cast ==
=== Platoon ===
- David Niven as Lieutenant Jim Perry
- William Hartnell as Sergeant Ned Fletcher (credited as Billy Hartnell)
- Hugh Burden as Private Bill Parsons
- James Donald as Private, later Corporal, Evan Lloyd
- Leslie Dwyer as Private Sid Beck
- Jimmy Hanley as Private Geoffrey Stainer (credited as Jimmie Hanley)
- Stanley Holloway as Private Ted Brewer
- Raymond Huntley as Private Herbert Davenport
- John Laurie as Private Luke

=== Wives ===
- Penelope Dudley-Ward as Mrs Jim Perry (credited as Penelope Ward)
- Grace Arnold as Mrs Ned Fletcher
- Esma Cannon as Mrs Ted Brewer
- Eileen Erskine as Mrs Bill Parsons

=== Others ===
- Peter Ustinov as Rispoli, cafe owner
- Reginald Tate as the Training Company Commanding Officer
- Leo Genn as Captain Edwards
- Renée Asherson as Marjorie Gillingham (credited as Renee Ascherson)
- Mary Jerrold as Mrs Gillingham
- Jack Watling as Sergeant Buster, RAF
- Raymond Lovell as Mr Jackson
- A. E. Matthews as Colonel Walmsley
- Lloyd Pearson as Sam Thyrtle
- John Ruddock as Old Chelsea Soldier
- A. Bromley Davenport as Old Chelsea Soldier (credited as Bromley Davenport)
- Tessie O'Shea as Herself
- Trevor Howard as Ship's Officer (uncredited) (Note: Trevor Howard made his film debut in The Way Ahead.)
- George Merritt as the Sergeant-Major (uncredited)
- Tracy Reed as the Perrys' Daughter (uncredited)

== Production ==
The Way Ahead was written by Eric Ambler and Peter Ustinov, and directed by Carol Reed. The three had originally produced the 1943 44-minute training film The New Lot, which was produced for the Army Kinematograph Service. The Way Ahead was an expanded remake of their earlier film, this time intended for a commercial audience. The two films featured some of the same actors, including Laurie and Huntley, and a 23-year-old Peter Ustinov played one of the recruits.

The driving force behind the film was David Niven, a 1930 graduate of Sandhurst, who at the time was a major in the British Army working with the Army Film Unit and later served in Normandy with GHQ Liaison Regiment. Niven was the executive producer on The Way Ahead.

The last scene in The Way Ahead shows the soldiers advancing in a counter-attack. Instead of the film ending with the words "The End", it concludes with "The Beginning". In a film made and released during the war, this was an effort to galvanise public support for the final push in the war effort, with a perhaps not unintended reference to one of Winston Churchill's famous quotations: "This is not the end. It is not even the beginning of the end. But it is, perhaps, the end of the beginning."

Peter Ustinov wrote of sailing to North Africa with Carol Reed where footage of the Platoon in Algeria was filmed at Philippeville (now Skikda). The minaret of the town's Mosquée de Sidi Ali Dib is clearly visible as Bren carriers drive through the streets. Ustinov describes how the air raid bombing shots were created by demolition of local buildings at Bizerte in Tunisia by American Engineers, following damage incurred during the battle for the port in 1943.

In the United States, an edited version of The Way Ahead, with an introduction by journalist Quentin Reynolds, was released as Immortal Battalion.

== Reception ==
According to trade papers, The Way Ahead was a success at the British box office in 1944. According to Kinematograph Weekly the 'biggest winners' at the box office in 1944 Britain were For Whom the Bell Tolls, This Happy Breed, The Song of Bernadette, Going My Way, This Is the Army, Jane Eyre, The Story of Dr. Wassell, Cover Girl, The White Cliffs of Dover, Sweet Rosie O'Grady and Fanny By Gaslight. The biggest British hits of the year were, in order, This Happy Breed, Fanny By Gaslight, The Way Ahead and Love Story.

In 1945, The Way Ahead (referred to as Immortal Battalion) was listed as one of the Top Ten Films by the USA National Board of Review.

As Immortal Battalion, film critic and historian Leonard Maltin noted: "Exhilarating wartime British film showing how disparate civilians come to work together as a fighting unit; full of spirit and charm, with an outstanding cast, and fine script by Eric Ambler and Peter Ustinov."

The final scene of the advancing soldiers was imitated for the closing credits of the long-running BBC sitcom Dad's Army. John Laurie appeared in both productions and his performance in the sitcom credits replicates this film.
