= The New Lot =

1943 film directed by Carol Reed

- Directed by: Carol Reed
- Written by: Peter Ustinov; Eric Ambler
- Starring: Eric Ambler; Robert Donat; Kathleen Harrison
- Production company: Army Kinematograph Service
- Release date: 1943
- Running time: 42 minutes
- Country: United Kingdom
- Language: English

The New Lot is a 1943 British military training drama-documentary film directed by Carol Reed and starring Eric Ambler, Robert Donat, Kathleen Harrison, Bernard Lee, Raymond Huntley, John Laurie, Peter Ustinov and Austin Trevor, with music by Richard Addinsell. It was written by Ustinov and Ambler.

It was made for the Army Kinematograph Service, and follows five new conscripts from different backgrounds through their initial army training.

The film's only on-screen credits are: "Supervised by an Officer appointed by the General Staff; Produced for the Directorate of Army Kinematography; Approved January 1943; AKS Production".

The film was later expanded and remade as The Way Ahead (1944), co-written by Ambler and Ustinov, directed by Carol Reed, and starring David Niven. Huntley and Laurie reprised essentially the same roles, while Ustinov played a different part.

== Cast ==
None of the cast is credited on-screen. This cast list is sourced from the BFI.

- Eric Ambler as Bren Gun instructor
- Ivor Barnard as photographer
- Robert Donat as actor
- Ian Fleming as Medical Officer
- Philip Godfrey as Art Wallace
- Kathleen Harrison as Keith's mother
- Bryan Herbert as soldier
- Raymond Huntley as Barrington
- Mike Johnson as railway porter
- Geoffrey Keen as Corporal
- John Laurie as Harry Fyfe
- Bernard Lee as interviewing officer
- Albert Lieven as Czech soldier
- Bernard Miles as Ted Loman
- Stewart Rome as officer
- Johnnie Schofield as Homeguard Sgt
- John Slater as soldier in truck
- Austin Trevor as soldier talking to Corporal
- Peter Ustinov as Keith
