= It Began on the Clyde =

1946 short documentary film

- Directed by: Ken Annakin
- Screenplay by: Brian Smith
- Produced by: Ralph Keene
- Cinematography: Charles Marlborough
- Edited by: Peter Scott
- Production company: Greenpark Productions
- Release date: 1946
- Running time: 15 minutes
- Country: United Kingdom
- Language: English

It Began on the Clyde is a 1946 British short documentary film directed by Ken Annakin and featuring Molly Weir.

According to the record for the film at the National Library of Scotland, which includes the viewable film itself:

A look at stress and worker fatigue amongst Clydeside workers during the war, and how Ballochmyle hospital helped to overcome this. In 1941 an experiment in the medical treatment of war workers began on Clydeside. People not ill enough to go to their own specialists were taken into Emergency Medical Services hospitals to be thoroughly treated before their condition became serious. In four years, over 10,000 workers of all ages were dealt with in this way.

== Reception ==
The Monthly Film Bulletin wrote: "This film, produced by the Ministry of Information for the Department of Health, Scotland, should be useful for discussion groups on social services and the need for more facilities for preventive treatment. The fact that a good start has been made in Scotland should encourage people in England to consider how they may obtain a better and extended hospital and medical service."
