= Tales of Mystery =

British TV series (1961–1963)

- Genre: Horror; Mystery
- Presented by: John Laurie
- Country of origin: United Kingdom
- Original language: English
- No. of series: 3
- No. of episodes: 29 (all missing)

Production
- Producer: Peter Graham Scott
- Running time: 25 minutes
- Production company: Associated-Rediffusion

Original release
- Network: ITV
- Release: 1961 – 1963

Tales of Mystery is a British supernatural television drama anthology series based on the short stories of Algernon Blackwood. It was broadcast by ITV (Associated-Rediffusion) and ran over three seasons from 1961 to 1963. Produced by Peter Graham Scott, each episode was 25 minutes long and introduced by John Laurie (as the author himself). None of the 29 episodes broadcast survive in any television archive, however.

== Episodes ==
=== Season 1 ===
1. The Terror of the Twins
2. The Promise
3. The Man Who Was Milligan
4. The Tradition
5. The Empty Sleeve
6. Accessory Before The Fact
7. The Woman's Ghost Story
8. Decoy

=== Season 2 ===
1. Confession
2. Chinese Magic
3. Max Hensig
4. The Man Who Found Out
5. Nephele
6. Ancient Sorceries
7. Deferred Appointment
8. The Pikerstaffe Cast
9. The Telephone
10. The Call
11. Wolves of God

=== Season 3 ===
1. Old Clothes
2. The Doll
3. Egyptian Sorcery
4. The Damned
5. The Second Generation
6. A Case of Eavesdropping
7. Petershin And Mr Snide
8. The Lodger
9. The Insanity of Jones
10. Dream Cottage
