= Mr. Perrin and Mr. Traill =

- Directed by: Lawrence Huntington
- Written by: Hugh Walpole (novel); L.A.G. Strong; T.J. Morrison
- Produced by: Alexander Galperson
- Starring: Marius Goring; David Farrar; Greta Gynt; Raymond Huntley; Edward Chapman
- Cinematography: Erwin Hillier
- Edited by: Ralph Kemplen
- Music by: Allan Gray
- Production company: Two Cities Films
- Distributed by: General Film Distributors; Eagle-Lion Films (US)
- Release date: 25 August 1948
- Running time: 92 minutes
- Country: United Kingdom
- Language: English
- Budget: £190,700
- Box office: £86,100

Mr. Perrin and Mr. Traill is a 1948 British drama film directed by Lawrence Huntington and starring Marius Goring, David Farrar, Greta Gynt, Edward Chapman and Raymond Huntley. It was written by L.A.G. Strong and T.J. Morrison based on the 1911 novel of the same title by Hugh Walpole.

== Plot ==
The comfortable but lonely world of a middle-aged schoolmaster, "Pompo" Perrin, is upset when a new colleague arrives and proves popular with the boys, if impatient with petty school norms. The school, part of an isolated cliffside community in Cornwall, is a minor private one run by a headmaster who is somewhat sadistic and threatening towards his staff. Perrin's frustration deepens as Traill, the younger man, who has seen action in the war and is more worldly and confident, begins a relationship with an attractive school nurse, with whom Perrin has for some time been enamoured. Perrin feels himself increasingly undermined and humiliated at work, and losing his connection to his pupils. He slides into resentment and depression. He develops fantasies of violence against his perceived enemy, leading to a tragic conclusion.

== Cast ==
- Marius Goring as Vincent Perrin
- David Farrar as David Traill
- Greta Gynt as Isobel Lester
- Raymond Huntley as Moy-Thompson
- Edward Chapman as Birkland
- Mary Jerrold as Mrs. Perrin
- Ralph Truman as Comber
- Finlay Currie as Sir Joshua Varley
- Maurice Jones as Clinton
- Lloyd Pearson as Dormer
- May MacDonald as Mrs. Dormer
- Viola Lyel as Mrs. Comber
- Pat Nye as Matron

== Reception ==
=== Box office ===
The film earned producer's receipts of £67,200 in the UK and £18,900 overseas.

According to Rank's own records the film had made a loss of £194,600 for the company by December 1949.

=== Critical ===
The Monthly Film Bulletin wrote: "This is a leisurely unfolded story of public school life, occasionally melodramatic but leavened with deft touches of humour, and one which good acting, direction and camerawork have made into an entertaining film. Its most notable features are Marius Goring's characterisation of Peirin and Edward Chapman's performance as Birkland, a member of the school staff. David Farrar is competent in the less exacting role of Traill, and Greta Gynt, as Isobel Lester, has little to do beyond looking attractive."

Kine Weekly wrote: "The picture, at once noble and mean, warm and frigid, funny and austere, carefully mirrors and analyses the psychology of the schoolmaster. The men who are entrusted with the task of moulding the characters of the young are, in a manner of speaking, compelled to turn out their own pockets, and the contents form the wherewithal of intelligent, thoughtful and enteriaining comedy drama. Not only excellently acted but set in impeccable atmosphere, it makes its many points without casting any slurs on the English public school system. Without question, the best school yarn since Goodbye Mr. Chips. Incidentally, the censor deserves the cane for giving it an "A' certificate!"
