= Fenlands (film) =

1945 film by Ken Annakin

- Directed by: Ken Annakin
- Cinematography: Peter Hennessy
- Edited by: Peter Scott
- Production company: Greenpark Productions
- Release date: 1945
- Running time: 19 minutes
- Country: United Kingdom
- Language: English

Fenlands is a 1945 British short documentary film directed by Ken Annakin for the Ministry of Information's Pattern of Britain series. It documents the Fenlands of East Anglia, and their change from swamplands to farmlands.

== Reception ==
The Monthly Film Bulletin wrote: "This is a most interesting, well-directed and photographed film which gives a clear picture of this part of the country. Parts of the commentary are spoken by a farmer and fen-workers in a way which adds to the film's reality. This is a film which is both instructive and enjoyable."

Kine Weekly wrote: "Opening with diagrammatic maps of the Fen district, this highly interesting documentary traces the history of East Anglia's marshlands from their original reclamation by Dutch engineers to their present-day status as a first-class agricultural area. It lays stress on the continuous battle with Nature. Entertaining short with educational values."
