= Pat Nye =

British actress (1908–1994)

Pat Nye in The Mirror Crack'd (1980)

Patricia Dorothy Nye, OBE (11 February 1908 – 11 April 1994) was an English actress-manager. She had a six-decade career, and was known in her later years for playing formidable women.

She was appointed Officer of the Order of the British Empire (OBE) in the 1946 King's Honours List for her service as a chief officer in the Women's Royal Naval Service during the Second World War.

== Early life and theatre roles ==
Born into a middle-class family in London in 1908, she was the daughter of Elizabeth Innes Hall (1878–1946) and Ralph Nye (1876–1961), a chartered accountant.

Privately educated at the University of Lausanne and Lausanne Conservatory where she studied music, she trained as an actress at the Royal Academy of Dramatic Art (RADA) on her return to the UK, making her professional debut in 1933 with the Rep Players at Croydon, playing Frau Feldman in Autumn Crocus, in the same year playing Martha Brown in Gallows Glorious at the old Shaftesbury Theatre. Later she joined the repertory company at the De La Warr Pavilion at Bexhill-on-Sea. From 1934 to 1937 she was the manager of the Theatre Royal in Margate, which had previously been the theatrical home of Sarah Thorne, another actress-manager. At other times she also managed the Park Theatre in Hanwell and the Pier Theatre in Lowestoft.

She joined the Women's Royal Naval Service (Wrens) on the outbreak of the Second World War in 1939, reaching the rank of Chief Officer and was awarded a military OBE.

From 1949 Nye was the managing director and actress-manager of the Bedford Theatre in Camden Town, where she appeared as Lady Audley in Lady Audley's Secret which transferred to the Prince's Theatre in the West End. During Nye's time at the Bedford she introduced such melodramas as East Lynne, The Bells and The Silver King.

In the West End Nye appeared as Mrs Playbill in For Love or Money at the Ambassadors Theatre, and Miss Stulkeley in Preserving Mr Panmure at the Arts Theatre. She made her debut in the United States in 1951 in New York as Statateeta in Caesar and Cleopatra and Attendant on Octavia in Antony and Cleopatra at the Ziegfeld Theatre. She returned to Broadway in 1960 to play Hippobomene in Rape of the Belt and Lysistrata in a revival of George Bernard Shaw's The Apple Cart at the Martin Beck Theatre.

Back in the UK, Nye returned to the Theatre Royal in Margate hoping to restore its fortunes, but competition from the newly popular medium of television and dropping visitor numbers led to failure.

== Film and television ==
Film appearances included the Matron in Mr. Perrin and Mr. Traill (1948), Mrs. O'Brien in Rover and Me (1949), Ma Benson in The Adventures of P.C. 49: Investigating the Case of the Guardian Angel (1949), ATS auxiliary in Appointment with Venus (1951), and the Mayoress in The Mirror Crack'd (1980).

== Death ==
Pat Nye died in Richmond in 1994, aged 86, from undisclosed causes. She never married.

== Filmography ==
Year	Title	Role	Notes
1948	Mr. Perrin and Mr. Traill	Matron	
1949	The Adventures of PC 49 Investigating the Case of the Guardian Angel	Ma Benson	
1949	Rover and Me	Mrs. O'Brien	
1949	A Man's Affair	Mrs. Mustard	
1951	Appointment with Venus	A.T.S., W / O	
1953	Street Corner	C.S.M.	
1980	The Mirror Crack'd	Mayoress	
