= We Serve =

1942 British short film

- Directed by: Carol Reed
- Produced by: Sydney Box
- Starring: Peggy Ashcroft; Joyce Carey; Penelope Dudley-Ward; Celia Johnson; Ann Todd; Googie Withers
- Edited by: Peter Tanner
- Production company: Verity Films
- Release date: 1942
- Running time: 30 minutes
- Country: United Kingdom
- Language: English

We Serve is a 1942 British short black and white recruitment and training film directed by Carol Reed and starring Peggy Ashcroft and Joyce Carey, about the lives of officers in the Auxiliary Territorial Service (ATS). It was produced by Sydney Box and made by Box's company Verity Films for the Directorate of Army Kinematography.

== Cast ==
- Peggy Ashcroft as Ann
- Joyce Carey as medical officer
- Penelope Dudley-Ward as ATS Auxiliary Sidley
- Celia Johnson as Cargill
- Ann Todd
- Googie Withers as Private Rose Bostock
- Esma Cannon as young private
- Jean Knox as herself, ATS Director
- Brefni O'Rorke as Colonel

== Production ==
The involvement of Reed as director enabled Box to secure the services of several leading British actresses for the film, all agreeing to be paid £5 per day. The film also featured the then Director of the ATS, Jean Knox.

The 30-minute film was commissioned shortly after the British government changed the nature of the ATS from being a voluntary body to becoming a professional service with full military status in April 1941. It was concurrent with a wider recruitment drive to expand the size of the ATS. In its efforts to attract recruits, the film emphasised that femininity could be retained in wartime.

== See also ==
- The Gentle Sex, a 1943 film about recruits in the ATS
