= Leslie Sarony =

British singer and actor (1897–1985)

- Born: Leslie Legge Frye; 22 January 1897; Surbiton, Surrey, England
- Died: 12 February 1985 (aged 88); London, England

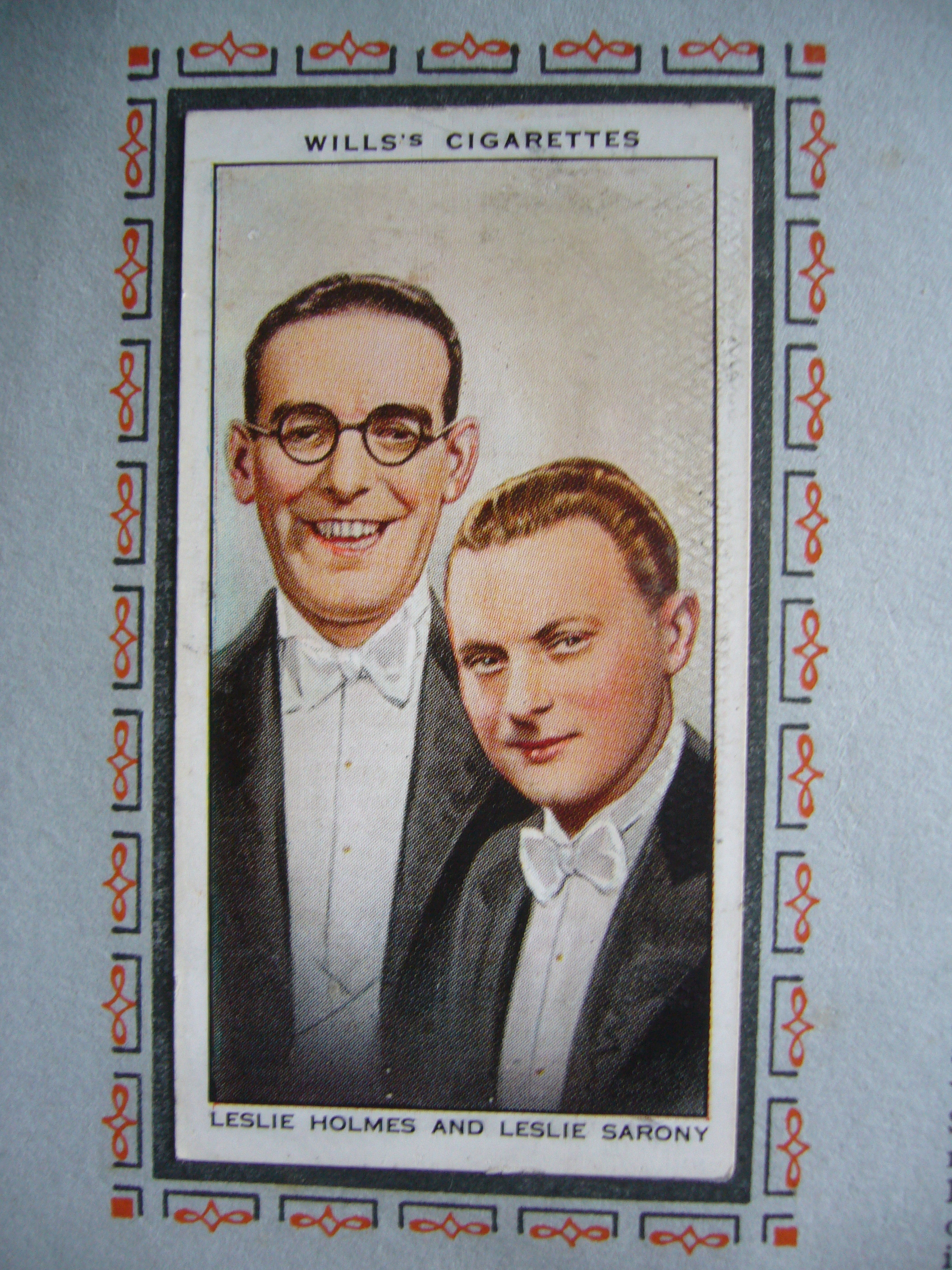
A Wills cigarette card from the 'Radio Celebrities' series, c. 1934; Sarony on right

Leslie Sarony (born Leslie Legge Frye; 22 January 1897 – 12 February 1985) was a British entertainer, singer, actor and songwriter.

== Biography ==
Sarony was born in Surbiton, Surrey, England, the son of William Henry Frye, alias William Rawstorne Frye, an Irish-born artist and photographer, and his wife, Mary Sarony, who was born in New York City. He was christened as Leslie Legge Tate Frye at the Church of St Mary the Virgin, Twickenham, on 5 May 1898.

He began his stage career aged 14, with the group Park Eton's Boys. In 1913 he appeared in the revue, Hello Tango.

In World War I, Sarony served (as Private Leslie Sarony Frye) in the London Scottish Regiment and the Royal Army Medical Corps in France and Salonika, and was awarded the Silver War Badge.

His stage credits after the war included revues, pantomimes and musicals, including the London productions of Show Boat and Rio Rita.

Sarony became known in the 1920s and 1930s as a variety artist and radio performer. In 1928, he made a short film in the Phonofilm sound-on-film system, Hot Water and Vegetabuel. In this film, he sang, interspersed with his comic patter, the two eponymous songs – the first as a typical Cockney geezer outside a pub, the second (still outside the pub) as a less typical vegetable rights campaigner ("Don't be cruel to a vegetabuel"). He recorded novelty songs, such as "He Played his Ukulele as the Ship Went Down", including several with Jack Hylton and his Orchestra. He teamed up with Leslie Holmes (Note: Leslie Holmes (14 December 1901–28 December 1960), English actor. Not to be confused with Leslie Holmes (30 April 1901–20 March 1983), Canadian baritone and voice teacher.) in 1933 under the name 'The Two Leslies'. The partnership lasted until 1946. Their recorded output included such numbers as "I'm a Little Prairie Flower".

His 1929 song "Jollity Farm" and his 1930 version of “Hunting Tigers Out in ‘Indiah’” were recorded by the Bonzo Dog Doo-Dah Band, the former was released on their 1967 album Gorilla and the latter on their 1969 LP Tadpoles.

Sarony continued to perform into his eighties, moving on to television and films. In the 1970s, he appeared in such programmes as the Harry Worth Show, Crossroads, Z-Cars, The Good Old Days, and The Liberace Show, as well as the sitcom Nearest and Dearest. He appeared in the first episode of police drama The Sweeney ("Ringer", 1975) as a police informant known as 'Soldier'.

He took over from Bert Palmer as the senile Uncle Staveley ("I heard that! Pardon?") in the fourth and final series of I Didn't Know You Cared in 1979. In 1983, Sarony appeared as one of the many elderly insurance clerks in The Crimson Permanent Assurance segment of Monty Python's The Meaning of Life.

He died in London, aged 88. His sons are Neville Sarony KC, a barrister and author (The Dharma Expedient) in Hong Kong; Peter Sarony, a successful gunsmith with a business in London; and Paul Sarony, an independent film producer (Mrs Brown, Hideous Kinky, Shine).

== Selected filmography ==
- Aunt Sally (1933)
- Soldiers of the King (1933)
- Where's George? (1935)
- Sunshine Ahead (1936)
- When You Come Home (1948)
- Game for Three Losers (1965)
- It Shouldn't Happen to a Vet (1977)
- Waterloo Sunset (Play For Today) (1979)
- Monty Python's The Meaning of Life (1983)

== Songs ==
- "Don't Be Cruel to a Vegetabuel" (1928)
- "Don't Do That to the Poor Puss Cat" (1928)
- "Forty-Seven Ginger-Headed Sailors" (1928, featured in Jeeves and Wooster)
- "I Lift Up My Finger (and I Say 'Tweet Tweet')" (1929, featured in Jeeves and Wooster and in Mother Riley Meets the Vampire)
- "Jollity Farm" (1929)
- "Mucking About the Garden" (1929)
- "The Alpine Milkman" (1930)
- "Gorgonzola" (1930)
- "Icicle Joe the Eskimo" (1931)
- "Rhymes" (1931)
- "Jolly Good Company" (A-side Eclipse record No. 122, copyright Campbell, Connelly & Co)
- "Let's Sing the Song Father Used to Sing" (B-side Eclipse record No. 122, copyright Campbell, Connelly & Co)
- "Ain't It Grand to Be Bloomin' Well Dead" (1932)
- "Wheezy Anna" (1933)
- "It's Jolly Old Christmas" (1933)
- "Coom Pretty One" (1934)
- "I Took My Harp to a Party" (Carter-Gay) A-side Rex 8063 A (B-side "Why Build a Wall 'Round a Graveyard?") (Sarony) (1934)
- "The Old Sow (Susannah's a Funniful Man)" (1935)
- "The Dart Song / The Love Bug Will Bite You" (1937)
- "We're Going to Hang out the Washing on the Siegfried Line" (1939)
- "The Flirtation Waltz" (1952)

"Bunkey-doodle-I-doh" was the B-side of "Jollity Farm" by the International Novelty Orchestra on Zonophone 5513 (pressing no. 30-2138). "Jollity Farm" was pressing no. 30-2139.
