= Diana Decker =

American-British actress and singer (1925–2019)

- Born: Isabella Charlotte Decker; January 9, 1925; Brooklyn, New York, U.S.
- Died: January 4, 2019 (aged 93); Camden, London, England
- Occupations: Actress, singer, television personality
- Years active: 1943–1960s

Diana Charlotte Landeryou (born Isabella Charlotte Decker; 9 January 1925 – 4 January 2019) was an American-born British actress, singer, and television personality, whose career lasted from the 1940s to the early 1960s.

== Early life ==
Decker was born to an American father and British mother in Brooklyn, New York, in 1925. At the age of four, she moved to Britain with her mother.

== Career ==
Her first film appearance was in 1943, in San Demetrio London, and the following year she appeared in the musical comedy Fiddlers Three. Further film roles followed, including parts in The Root of All Evil (1947), When You Come Home (1947), Murder at the Windmill (1949), Saturday Island (1949), A Man's Affair (1952), It Started in Paradise (1952), Will Any Gentleman...? (1953), and Is Your Honeymoon Really Necessary? (1953). She specialised in "dizzy blonde" roles in light comedy films and also played this stereotype in a small part in her most significant film appearance in The Barefoot Contessa (1954). In 1947, Decker was also one of the first performers to gain fame from a television advertising campaign, playing "Miriam" in a Pepsodent commercial.

In 1953, Decker appeared in the British television comedy series Before Your Very Eyes!, starring Arthur Askey, and also chaired some editions of the television quiz Film Fanfare during the 1950s. She continued to act in films, including A Yank in Ermine (1955) and The Betrayal (1957), and featured in several episodes of the television drama series The Vise.

Decker's stage work included playing Billie Dawn in the Dublin (Gaiety Theatre) production of Born Yesterday in 1949, and she performed onstage in 1951–52 in William Chappell's The Lyric Revue at the Globe Theatre in London. In 1957, when BBC Radio revived Ian Messiter's comedy panel game One Minute Please! (upon which Just A Minute was based), Decker appeared as a regular panelist on the ladies' team, playing against Gerard Hoffnung, Eric Sykes and Messiter. It was hosted by broadcaster Michael Jackson, and lasted only one series. In 1959, she appeared in the musical The Quiz Kid at the Lyric Theatre in Hammersmith, London.

Decker had few credits in the 1960s, although she did play a supporting role in Stanley Kubrick's 1962 film of Lolita. Her final film appearance was in 1965: an atypical role in the horror film Devils of Darkness.

Decker also had a recording career. Her recording of "Poppa Piccolino", a version of the Italian song "Papaveri e papere" by Vittorio Mascheroni, with English words by Robert Musel, reached no.2 on the UK singles chart. However, a string of subsequent singles up to 1956 failed to chart. Decker's recordings were reissued in 2002 on the CD The Complete Diana Decker.

== Personal life and death ==
Decker married Australian actor and musician Eden Landeryou, aka Eddy Eden, in 1948. In 1954 Eden was fined £3, with 10 guineas (£10 10s) costs, after hitting a man who criticised Decker's acting in the play Thirteen for Dinner and was alleged to have claimed, "she should have been strangled at birth". Landeryou, who was more than 20 years older than Decker, died in 1987, at the age of 87.

In 2002, it was reported that Decker was living quietly in London. She died there in January 2019, aged 93.

== Filmography ==
Year	Title	Role	Notes
1943	San Demetrio London	Shopgirl	
1944	Fiddlers Three	Lydia	
1947	The Root of All Evil	Pam	
1947	Meet Me at Dawn	2nd Girl in Restaurant	
1947	When You Come Home	Paula Ryngelbaum	
1949	Murder at the Windmill	Frankie	
1949	A Man's Affair	Sheila	
1952	Saturday Island	Nurse	
1952	It Started in Paradise	Crystal Leroy	
1953	Will Any Gentleman...?	Angel	
1953	Is Your Honeymoon Really Necessary?	Gillian Vining	
1954	Knave of Hearts	Diana	Uncredited
1954	The Barefoot Contessa	Drunken Blonde	
1955	A Yank in Ermine	Gloria Peters	
1957	The Betrayal	Janet Hillyer	
1962	Lolita	Jean Farlow	
1962	Two Guys Abroad		
1965	Devils of Darkness	Madeleine Braun	(final film role)
