= Ray Ventura =

Ray Ventura may refer to:

- Ray Ventura (pianist) (1908–1979), French jazz pianist and bandleader
- Ray Ventura (actor) (1944–2001), Filipino character actor
