= Calling Blighty =

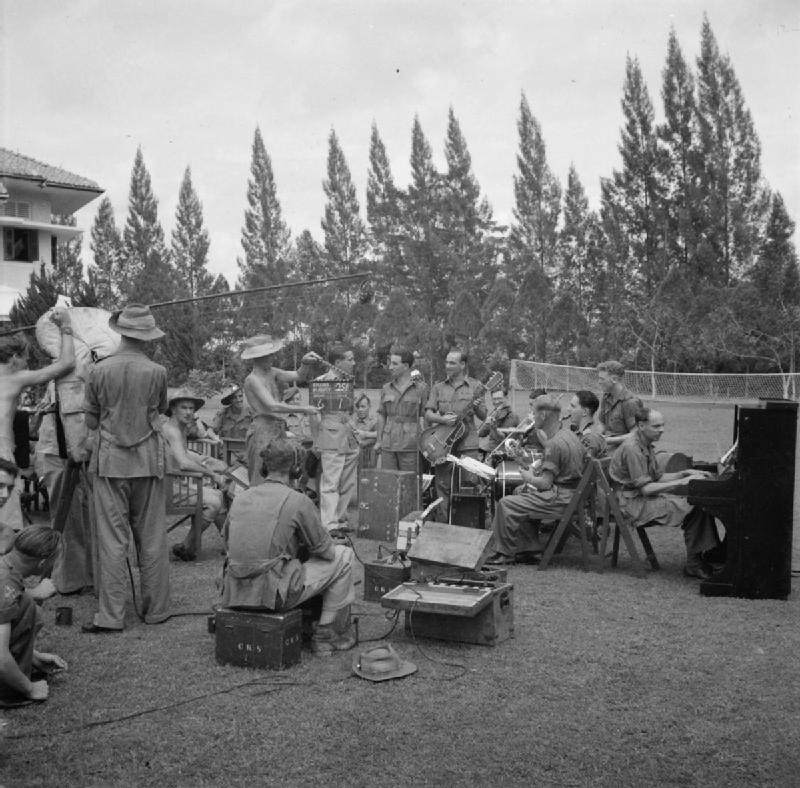
A Calling Blighty film unit sets up a shot with the dance band of the Cameronians in Singapore 21 February 1946. On the right of the camera is the producer, Captain L Hamilton-Webb, while around the microphone are Staff Captain Jackson and brothers Louis and Ted De Rosa.

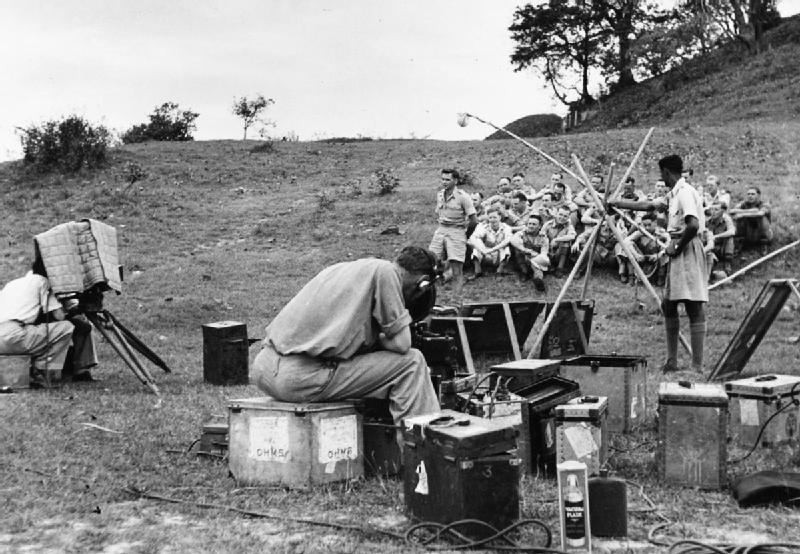
A Calling Blighty film crew prepares to film Royal Air Force personnel from Sheffield in a forward area on the Burma Front.

Produced by the Directorate for Army Welfare (DAK) in India from 1944 to 1946, Calling Blighty was a series of ten-minute films which featured members of the British Armed Forces stationed in India and Southeast Asia speaking a personal message direct to camera. These films were shown back in the UK to a specially invited audience in a cinema in the area from which those featured came.

== Background ==
Poor welfare and especially length of tour duty, crystallised in the phrase "the Forgotten Army", led the War Office to investigate the significant issue of morale, which culminated in a tour of South East Asia Command (SEAC) by the Earl of Munster and his subsequent report in September 1944, although a Morale Committee had met regularly in the War Office since 1942. Calling Blighty was one of the steps introduced by the War Office to address concerns of low morale within the 14th Army stationed in India and SEAC during the latter stages of the Second World War.

The series title was probably derived from a Pathé Gazette newsreel issue of early 1944 featuring soldiers based in Italy and the first DAK Calling Blighty was issued in April 1944. The production was based at what was then the Training Film Centre in Bombay, already a film production centre for the making of training films for the Indian Army, (and later to become the Combined Kinematograph Services Film Production and Training Centre – CKS), with studio space rented at the Shree Sound Studios.

Calling Blighty was produced in two different formats: one was studio-based and the other shot on location. In the studio a canteen set was built to provide a realistic and relaxing environment and personnel were brought in to deliver their messages. On location the unit had to find the personnel – and they travelled widely, through India, Burma and Malaya – whom they filmed outside, usually with some significant landmark behind them. The format was similar to the canteen set-up, with each person addressing their loved ones with a short message direct to camera.

The equipment used by both studio and location units was broadly the same; 35mm camera, film and sound equipment. In 1945 the cumbersome separate sound camera was replaced by a sound-on-film camera similar to those used for newsreels. The studio had a permanent complement of staff consisting of Indian as well as British personnel. The location unit usually comprised a director, two cameramen, two sound recordists, two assistants and a welfare officer responsible for making the contacts. At least one of the location units operated as part of the Army Kinematograph Service (AKS) and had been sent out from the UK to assist.

Generally, people from one particular city, town or region were grouped together in order to facilitate screening back in the UK, and while personnel from all three services are featured, they are predominantly from the army. The completed negatives were sent by sea to the UK, a journey of about six weeks. On arrival the negative was sent to Denham Studios near Uxbridge, Middlesex, where a print was made for distribution, although a copy was kept in Bombay as a precaution against the negative being lost.

Each Calling Blighty screening took place at a cinema in the subjects local area and was usually organised by the regional Army Welfare Committee. The names and addresses of those to be invited were sent to the UK along with the films.

These films continued to be produced after the surrender of Japan in August 1945 as many thousands of service personnel were still needed in SEAC; transport and forces were still required for the occupation of Malaya, Java and the return of thousands of prisoners of war, as well as for the occupation of Japan. Production of Calling Blighty finally ceased in April 1946.

It is estimated that only slightly more than 10% of the Calling Blighty films have survived - some 52 issues. It is estimated some 400 issues were produced, the majority of the originals – 47 – are held by the Imperial War Museum Film Archive. An additional five are held by the British Film Institute National Film Archive. Copies of all Manchester issues are held by the North West Film Archive at Manchester Metropolitan University who are running a project to trace all family members. Individual copies relating to Norwich and Southampton are held by the relevant regional film archives.
