= Army Kinematograph Service =

Kinematographic branch of the British Army during World War II

- Active: From August 1941

The Army Kinematograph Service (AKS) was established during the Second World War by the British government in August 1941 to meet the increasing training and recreational needs of the British Army. Created by the newly established Directorate of Army Kinematography, whose remit was "to be responsible for providing and exhibiting all films required by the Army (at home and abroad) for training, educational and recreational purposes", it expanded over the next few years to become the most prominent film production and exhibition section for a major part of the British Armed Forces.

== Background ==
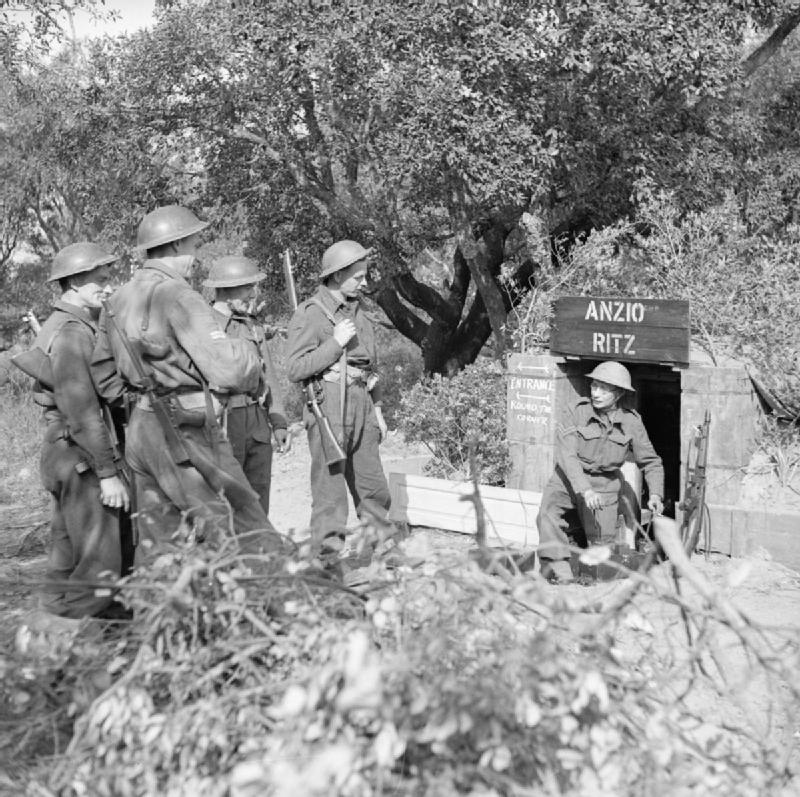
Corporal M A Moyse of the Army Kinematograph Service (AKS) at the entrance to the Anzio Ritz, a small dug-out cinema created for U.S. Fifth Army troops in the Anzio beachhead in Italy, March 1944

Pre-1939, the Army Kinema Establishment, part of the Royal Army Ordnance Corps based at Aldershot in Surrey, had been responsible for making and exhibiting training films for the Army. In 1940 it was transferred to Wembley Studios (the 20th Century Fox Studios requisitioned for the war) to continue its activities. In August 1941 it was absorbed and expanded into the AKS. Thorold Dickinson was Head of Production (a role acquired partly through his involvement in the making of the highly successful The Next of Kin in early 1942, a film requested by the War Office and made at Ealing Studios), and he was initially instrumental in recruiting many of those who had been involved in the film industry. The result has been described as "a roll call of many of the finest film technicians whose skills were reflected in the quality of AKS training films" and some fairly well-known names contributed, others developing skills that assisted their post-war eminence; Eric Ambler, Roy Ward Baker, Thorold Dickinson, Freddie Francis, Carol Reed, Peter Ustinov and Freddie Young to name but a few.

The Directorate of Kinematography (DAK) started in April 1941 with only two branches. In October 1941, it moved to Curzon Street House, London W1 where it was based for the duration of World War II. In November 1941 it requisitioned the Curzon Cinema partly to meet its own screening needs, but also as a showpiece cinema for the services and for those of other government departments. By mid-1942 DAK had increased to five branches to deal with the growing demands of the war, covering such areas as policy, planning and production, finance, distribution and exhibition. In 1944 it assumed full responsibility for cinema facilities in North Africa, the Mediterranean area, the Far East and in 1945 it took over the cinema activities of NAAFI and ENSA. The centralisation of activities under DAK meant an increasingly efficient supply of cinema facilities to the Army at war, worldwide.

With the establishment of the AKS and its much improved production resources, the Army's increased needs could be more efficiently met; production units could be ordered out on location, at home and abroad; there was greater security when making films on subjects that were deemed secret; high-priority films could be rushed through as necessary. What became an enormous output of films gave opportunities to young and relatively inexperienced film personnel which they were unlikely to have received in peacetime, at least over such a short period. For example, Freddie Francis entered as a camera assistant and subsequently covered everything from writing to directing, Roy Ward Baker entered as a production manager and spent most of his time directing, Peter Newbrook – a later president of the British Society of Cinematographers – began as a cameraman and became a director. This was all in the space of a little more than three years.

The films produced covered a broad range of topics and were delivered in a wide variety of styles; from straightforward technical films on a subject such as a 6 pounder gun through to specialised medical films, "careless talk", street fighting, post-war jobs, food in the mess (The Soldier's Food, 1942), and problems faced by new recruits. The last topic was dealt with in a film called The New Lot. Made in 1943 for the Directorate of Army Psychiatry, directed by Carol Reed and scripted by Eric Ambler (who in 1944 became the Head of Production at the AKS) and Peter Ustinov – both of whom appear in the film – it detailed the many different problems facing new recruits and the way they coped. Though at the time it did not have the wider impact of something like The Next of Kin, it is now considered a minor classic. Its influence was sufficient for it to be used as the basis for the 1944 feature film The Way Ahead. Between 1944-1946 a series of morale-boosting films were made on location in the Far East called Calling Blighty. These were filmed messages home from members of the "Forgotten Army" and provided a much-needed link between the UK and personnel stationed (and fighting) in places such as Burma, India and Ceylon.

By 1943 there were over a hundred mobile cinema units in the UK and approximately four hundred 16mm ones, but only one overseas, in North Africa. After the Allied landings in Italy and Normandy this expanded enormously, with a consequent demand on personnel and equipment.

Projectionists were trained at the Regent Street and Northern Polytechnics in central and east London, males at the former and females (who were part of the ATS) at the latter. The course was rigorous, lasting six weeks and ending with a trade test after which those qualifying had to undergo a further two weeks' training on petrol generators. Those who were deemed able were sent on a driving course and then on to a cine section.

A mobile cine section typically comprised around seven 16mm units and two 35mm units. The 16mm units operated out of 15-cwt Bedford trucks, carrying two projectors, a generator and a portable screen. The 35mm units used 3-ton Bedford trucks, as the equipment and film were much bulkier and heavier; additionally, the 35mm units had to carry their own collapsible fireproof projection box, owing to the high flammability of nitrate film. The two crew – a corporal and private – endured a nomadic life, going almost daily to different venues and being "in the field" for up to a month at a time. During this period they not only had to make do with what they found to show their films – damaged buildings, barns and sometimes just the open air – but also depended on their location for food and billet. This sometimes meant going without and on occasions coming under fire.

Always distinct from other filmmaking sections of the armed forces – the Directorate of Public Relations retained control over this area – the AKS continued to provide much-needed cinema and production facilities up to the end of the war and beyond. Post-war it went through several name and organisational changes: in 1946 it became the Army Kinema Corporation (AKC) - retaining the, by then, archaic spelling of Kinema to differentiate it from the ACC, the Army Catering Corps - though camp cinemas bore signs reading AKC Cinema; in 1969 the Services Kinema Corporation (SKC), reflecting its then relationship with all three services; in 1982 the Services Sound and Vision Corporation (SSVC), responsible for all audio-visual services to the Forces.
