= Leslie Holmes (variety entertainer) =

English variety show entertainer and musician (1901–1960)

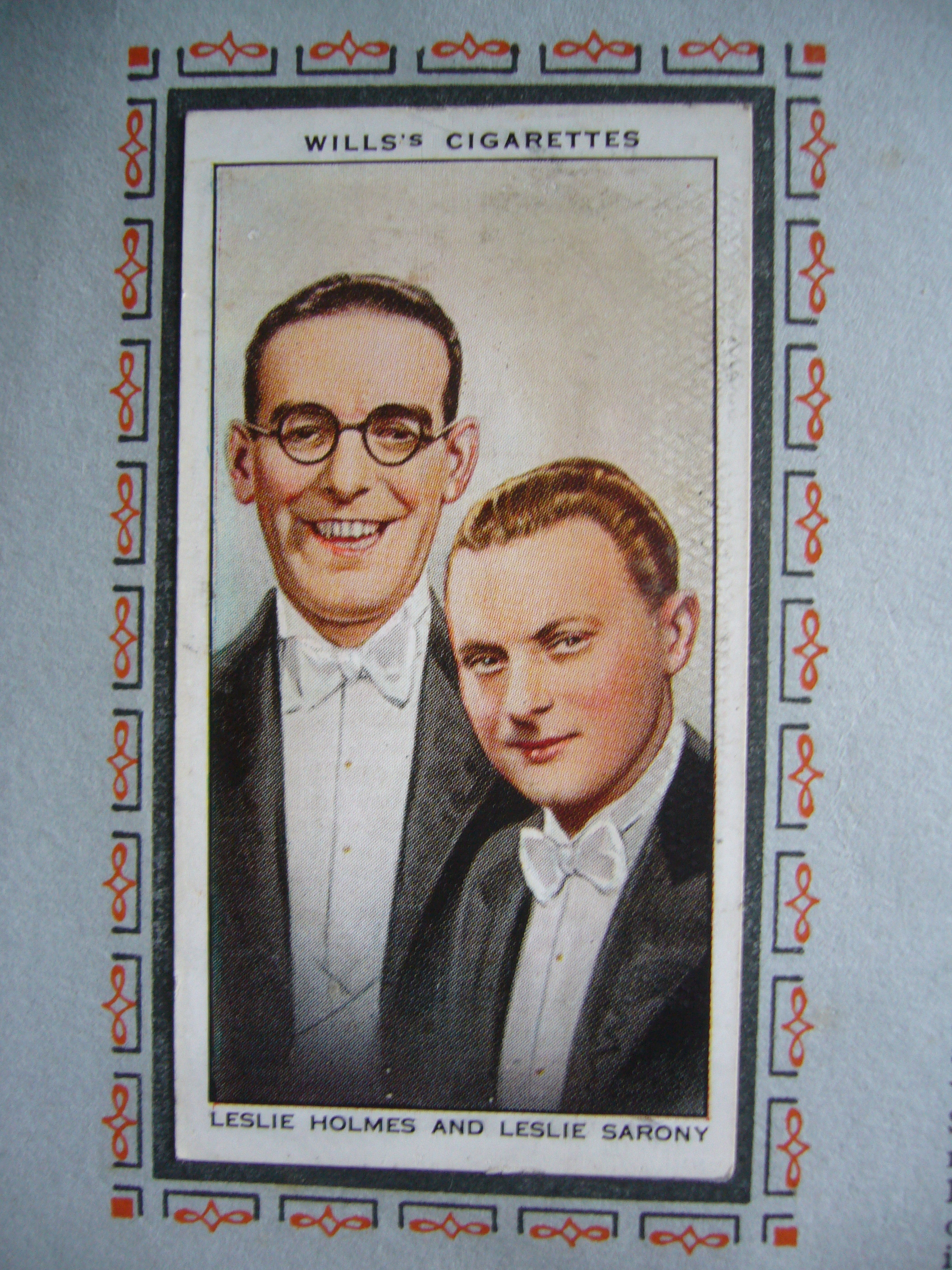
Leslie Holmes (left) with Leslie Sarony (right) on a cigarette card, c. 1934

Leslie Holmes (14 December 1901 – 28 December 1960) was an English variety show entertainer, pianist, drummer, popular music singer, bandleader, radio performer, songwriter, and actor. He was the longtime musical parter of Leslie Sarony with whom he formed the variety duo The Two Leslies.

== Early life ==
Leslie Holmes was born on 14 December 1901 in Newcastle upon Tyne. As a child he taught himself how to play the piano and drums. While continuing to play music as a hobby, he began his professional life in a series of changing jobs; working first as a drapery assistant, then in grocery wholesale retail, followed by stints as an estate agent, and a travelling salesman for a millinery business.

== Entertainment career ==
In 1920 Holmes obtained his first professional music employment when he was hired as an in-house pianist at a restaurant in Newcastle in 1920. Not long after he became a bandleader at the Manchester nightclub Chorlton Palais de Danse where he was scouted by bandleader Henry Hall who was then music director for the hotel chain operated by the London, Midland and Scottish Railway. Hall poached him, and he became a drummer in his band. He made his first recordings with Hall in 1925.

A crisis of confidence led Holmes to abandon the entertainment business, and he temporarily worked for the Peek Freans biscuit company in London before being persuaded to become the office manager for Manchester music publishers Jimmy Campbell and Reg Connelly. His work for this office brought him into contact with Leslie Sarony, and it became apparent that they were both attracted to the same sort of song literature. In 1935 they formed a variety theatre double act known as The Two Leslies, a partnership which lasted for the next eleven years.

The Two Leslies were a leading variety theatre and radio act that extended to the end of World War II. The act featured witty banter, with Holmes at the piano and Sarony dancing, and both men singing. The duo specialised in topical songs, many of which were co-written by Holmes and Sarony. Holmes and Sarony appeared as themselves in the 1936 film Sunshine Ahead. Other highlights of their partnership included performing in a Royal Variety Performance, and touring North Africa to perform for troops during World War II.

In November 1936 The Two Leslies debuted their recurring radio program Radio Pie, which was co-created by Holmes and Sarony and featured other performers who worked with them such as Tommy Handley and Anne Ziegler. The show was a hit, and in 1939 the group successfully toured Britain in live performances. The variety act remained active in radio, recordings, and live performance in music halls until Holmes decided to retire in 1946. One of their final projects was the film When You Come Home which was not released until 1948, and in which Holmes portrayed the role of Fingers. The film featured The Two Leslies performing the song "Fill 'em Up Again".

== Later life and death ==
After his partnership with Sarony ended, Holmes worked as the publicity manager for the News of the World, being appointed to this post in 1947. For the next thirteen years he was part of the paper's circulation team, often travelling to public events such as sports tournaments to promote the paper.

Holmes died in Hove, East Sussex on 28 December 1960 at the age of 59, from an overdose of sleeping pills the day after a bad argument with his son. The death was ruled as a death by misadventure, the coroner noting the potentiality that it was accidental as he had been drinking and may have miscounted the number of pills taken.
