= A Midnight Clear (novel) =

Novel by William Wharton

- Author: William Wharton
- Language: English
- Publisher: Knopf
- Publication date: August 1982
- Publication place: United States
- Pages: 241
- ISBN: 9780394519678
- Preceded by: Dad
- Followed by: Scumbler

A Midnight Clear is the third novel by the American novelist William Wharton. Based on Wharton's own experiences, it was published in 1982 following Birdy (1978) and Dad (1981). The novels deals with six American soldiers who get a mission to have an eye on a German outpost at the heart of the Ardennes Forest, but the mission turns out to be much more difficult than expected. Wharton notes that he wrote this novel "thinking of the massacre of My Lai in Vietnam, to show how easy it was for a massacre to take place. And he did know how easy".

== Plot ==
The novel is set during the last days of WWII in the Ardennes Forest, and follows a group of six American soldiers, led by sergeant William Knot, called Won't by his comrades. Weary of this futile war, they are ordered to establish an observation post in an old chateau in order to have an eye on a German outpost. A few days after their arrival, they begin hearing strange noises and noticing Germans leaving strange signs of their presence. After some difficult communication with the Germans, they realize that the "Krauts" wish to surrender to avoid being sent to Russia. Everything seems perfectly ready for a fake surrender scene to finish the deal. But war is never so simple.

== Reception ==
Though not as popular as Wharton's earlier novels, A Midnight Clear was generally well-received by critics. For instance, Thomas R. Edwards of The New York Times calls the novel "a modest inquiry into war, youth and extinction ... [which is] also remarkable". Sherwood Williams of The Christian Science Monitor calls it a "WWII saga of remarkable power" noting that "Wharton reveals the ugliness of war far better by reminding us of the joy of life than by pedantically documenting the brutality of battle".

== Film adaptation ==
In 1992, the novel was adapted into a popular movie of the same name, starring an ensemble cast that features Ethan Hawke and Gary Sinise, among others. The film received generally positive reviews. It holds an 88% favorable rating on Rotten Tomatoes which is based on 40 reviews. One of its unique features is how it shows the relation with enemy soldiers: "One of the most impactful aspects of A Midnight Clear is that when the time comes to kill, the targets are no longer faceless". The Washington Post praises the movie as "a war film completely unlike any other, a compelling accomplishment that's more soul than blood and bullets".
