= Dad (novel) =

1981 novel by William Wharton

- Front cover
- Author: William Wharton
- Language: English
- Publisher: Knopf
- Publication date: 1981
- Publication place: United States
- Pages: 464
- ISBN: 155704256X
- Preceded by: Birdy
- Followed by: A Midnight Clear

Dad is the second novel by the American novelist William Wharton. It is "a story of fathers and sons drawn from [the author's own] relationship with his own dying father". The novel was published in 1981 following Birdy (1978). It deals with a Paris-based American artist who is called to his mother's bedside as she has had a serious heart attack. It was one of the three novels by Wharton which was adapted into a movie, the other two being Birdy and A Midnight Clear.

== Plot ==
The novel has a "double plot" in which we read about the protagonist's relation, as a son, with his father and, as a father, with his son.

John Tremont, a middle-aged American artist living with his wife and children in Paris, is summoned home to the US to his mother's bedside who has had a heart attack. This starts a long journey in which John, who is later joined by his college-aged son Bill, learns a lot about what it means to be a father and to get old as well as a new definition of love. The story deals with three generations each of which has a different way of seeing family relations as well as the world, but ultimately there is a common thread transcending generation gaps, a "love that binds generations".

== Reception ==
The novel is narrated in such a realistic manner that leads to some critics to believe that it cannot be fiction. For instance, Christopher Lehmann-Haupt of The New York Times writes that "one's first, unthinking reaction to William Wharton's Dad is that it can't be fiction". Kirkus Reviews compares this novel to Wharton's earlier work Birdy: "In Birdy, the wish to be a bird inhabited a boy; in Dad, the desire to have lived a better, different life floods through the consciousness of an old man under great stress", calling it in conclusion "a major novel from a writer whose magnitude has now been gloriously confirmed".

== Film adaptation ==
The novel was adapted into a 1989 movie of the same name directed by Gary David Goldberg and starring Jack Lemmon as Jack Tremont, Ted Danson as John Tremont, and Ethan Hawke as Billy Tremont. Dad currently holds a 60% rating on website Rotten Tomatoes, indicating largely mixed reviews by critics. Hal Hinson of The Washington Post wrote, "Dad is a melodramatic plumbing of the relationship between two generations of fathers and sons, and it runs through nearly the entire gamut of emotionally loaded issues, from infirmity and senility to reconciliation and death."
