= Angel Heart =

1987 film by Alan Parker

- Theatrical release poster
- Directed by: Alan Parker
- Screenplay by: Alan Parker
- Based on: Falling Angel by William Hjortsberg
- Produced by: Alan Marshall; Elliott Kastner
- Starring: Mickey Rourke; Robert De Niro; Lisa Bonet; Charlotte Rampling
- Cinematography: Michael Seresin
- Edited by: Gerry Hambling
- Music by: Trevor Jones
- Production company: Carolco Pictures
- Distributed by: Tri-Star Pictures (United States); Columbia-Cannon-Warner (United Kingdom)
- Release date: March 6, 1987
- Running time: 113 minutes
- Countries: United Kingdom; United States; Canada
- Language: English
- Budget: $18 million
- Box office: $17.2 million (domestic)

Angel Heart is a 1987 neo-noir psychological horror film, an adaptation of William Hjortsberg's 1978 novel Falling Angel. The film is written and directed by Alan Parker, and stars Mickey Rourke, Robert De Niro, Lisa Bonet and Charlotte Rampling. It is an international co-production between the United Kingdom, the United States and Canada. Harry Angel (Rourke), a New York City private investigator, is hired to solve the mysterious disappearance of a singer known as Johnny Favorite. His investigation takes him to New Orleans, where he becomes embroiled in a series of brutal murders.

Following publication of the novel, Hjortsberg began developing the screenplay for a film adaptation, but found that no major studio was willing to produce his script. The project resurfaced in 1985 when producer Elliott Kastner brought the book to Parker's attention. Parker began work on a new script and made several changes to Hjortsberg's novel. He also met with Mario Kassar and Andrew G. Vajna, who agreed to finance the $18 million production through their independent film studio Carolco Pictures. Filming took place on-location in New York City and New Orleans, with principal photography lasting from March to June 1986.

Weeks before its theatrical release, Angel Heart faced ratings issues from the Motion Picture Association of America for one scene of sexual content. Parker was forced to remove ten seconds of footage to avoid an X rating and secure the R rating that the film's distributor Tri-Star Pictures wanted. An unrated version featuring the removed footage was later released on home video.

Angel Heart received a mixed reaction from reviewers, who praised the performances of Rourke and Bonet, as well as the production design, score and cinematography, but criticized Parker's screenwriting. The film underperformed at the North American box office, grossing $17.2 million during its theatrical run, but has since been regarded as underappreciated and influential.

== Plot ==
In 1955 New York City, a man named Louis Cyphre contacts private investigator Harry Angel to track down crooner John Liebling, known professionally as Johnny Favorite. Favorite suffered neurological trauma resulting from injuries received in World War II. His incapacity disrupted a contract with Cyphre regarding unspecified collateral. Cyphre believes that a private hospital where Favorite was receiving radical psychiatric treatment for shell shock has falsified records.

At the hospital, Harry discovers that the records showing Favorite's transfer were indeed falsified by physician Albert Fowler. After Harry breaks into his home, Fowler admits that he was bribed years before by a man and woman so that the two could abscond with the disfigured Favorite. Believing that Fowler is withholding information, Harry locks him in his bedroom, forcing him to suffer withdrawal from a morphine addiction. Hours later, he finds that Fowler has apparently died by suicide with a gunshot to the eye.

A reluctant Harry agrees to continue the search when Cyphre offers him more money. He discovers that Favorite had a wealthy fiancée named Margaret Krusemark, but had also begun another affair. Harry travels to New Orleans and meets with Margaret, who says that Favorite is dead, or at least dead in her mind. Evangeline Proudfoot, Favorite's lover, died years before but is survived by her 17-year-old daughter Epiphany, who was conceived during the affair. Epiphany has a young light-skinned son of approximately three years old, and claims that she does not remember who fathered the boy.

Harry tracks down Toots Sweet, a guitarist and former Favorite bandmate. After Harry uses force to try to extract details of Favorite's last known whereabouts, Toots refers him back to Margaret. The following morning, police detectives inform Harry that Toots has been murdered by suffocation; his penis severed and stuffed down his throat. Harry returns to Margaret's home and finds her murdered; her heart removed with a ceremonial knife. He is subsequently attacked by enforcers of Ethan Krusemark—a powerful Louisiana patriarch and Margaret's father—who tell him to leave town.

Harry finds Epiphany at his hotel. He invites her into his room, where they have sex, during which Harry has visions of blood dripping from the ceiling and splashing around the room. He soon confronts Krusemark in a gumbo hut. Krusemark reveals that he and Margaret were the ones who took Favorite from the hospital. Favorite was actually a powerful occultist who sold his soul to Satan in exchange for stardom. He got his stardom but sought to renege on the bargain. To do so, he kidnapped a young soldier from Times Square who was his exact age and strongly resembled him, and performed a Satanic ritual on the boy, murdering him and eating his still-beating heart to steal his soul. Favorite planned to assume the soldier's identity, but he was sent overseas and suffered a severe war injury. He was sent to the hospital for treatment of facial trauma and amnesia.

After taking him from the hospital, Krusemark and Margaret left him at Times Square on New Year's Eve 1943 (the date on the falsified hospital records). While hearing Krusemark's story, Harry runs into the bathroom, vomits and continually asks for the soldier's identity. Krusemark says that the soldier's dog tags were sealed in a vase. He returns to find Krusemark drowned in a cauldron of boiling gumbo.

At Margaret's home, Harry finds the vase containing the soldier's dog tag—stamped with the name "Angel, Harold". Harry realizes that he and Johnny Favorite are actually the same person. Louis Cyphre, whose name is a homophone for Lucifer, suddenly appears. His true nature revealed, Cyphre proclaims that he can now claim what is his: Favorite's soul. Harry insists that he knows who he is, but his repressed memories of killing Dr. Fowler, Toots, the Krusemarks and Epiphany eventually come flooding back.

Harry returns to his hotel room, where the police have found Epiphany murdered by gunshot, the barrel of Harry's gun still inside her vagina, and his dog tags on her body. A police officer comes out of the bathroom carrying Epiphany's young son, who Harry realizes is his grandchild. Harry sees the child's eyes glow, just as Cyphre's had at their last meeting, implying that Satan is the one who impregnated Epiphany. A police detective tells Harry that he will burn for the murders, and Harry says, "I know. In Hell." Harry later stands inside an elevator that is interminably descending, presumably to Hell. Cyphre whispers, "Harry" and "Johnny", asserting dominion over both of their souls.

== Cast ==
- Mickey Rourke as Harry Angel
- Robert De Niro as Louis Cyphre
- Lisa Bonet as Epiphany Proudfoot
- Charlotte Rampling as Margaret Krusemark
- Stocker Fontelieu as Ethan Krusemark
- Brownie McGhee as Toots Sweet
- Michael Higgins as Dr. Albert Fowler
- Elizabeth Whitcraft as Connie
- Charles Gordone as Spider Simpson
- Dann Florek as Herman Winesap
- Kathleen Wilhoite as Nurse
- Eliott Keener as Detective Sterne
- Pruitt Taylor Vince as Detective Deimos

== Production ==
=== Development ===
"The original attraction was the fusion of two genres—the detective film and the supernatural."

— Alan Parker, writer and director.

Following publication of his 1978 novel Falling Angel, William Hjortsberg began work on a film adaptation. His friend, production designer Richard Sylbert, took the book's manuscript to producer Robert Evans. The film rights to the novel had been optioned by Paramount Pictures, with Evans slated to produce the film, John Frankenheimer hired to direct, and Hjortsberg acting as screenwriter. Frankenheimer was later replaced by Dick Richards, and Dustin Hoffman was being considered for the lead role. After Paramount's option expired, Hjortsberg discussed the project with Robert Redford and wrote two drafts. Hjortsberg, however, felt that no film studio was willing to produce his script. He reflected, "Even with [Redford] behind the script, studio executives weren't interested. 'Why can't it have a happy ending?' every bigshot demanded."

In 1985, producer Elliott Kastner met with Alan Parker at Pinewood Studios to discuss a film adaptation of the novel. Parker, who had read the book following its publication, agreed to write the screenplay. He met with Hjortsberg in London before moving to New York City, where he wrote most of the script. After completing the first draft in September 1985, Parker traveled to Rome, Italy, where he brought the script to Mario Kassar and Andrew G. Vajna. The two producers agreed to finance the film through their independent film studio, Carolco Pictures, and Parker was given creative control. Pre-production work on Angel Heart began in January 1986 in New York, where Parker selected the creative team, reuniting with several of his past collaborators, including producer Alan Marshall, director of photography Michael Seresin, camera operator Michael Roberts, production designer Brian Morris and editor Gerry Hambling.

=== Writing ===
Parker made several changes to the novel. He titled his script Angel Heart, for he wanted to distance his film adaptation from the source material. Although Falling Angel is set entirely in New York City, Parker had the second half of his script take place in New Orleans, based on the novel's perpetual allusions to voodoo and the occult. He discussed the story-setting change to Hjortsberg, who approved of the decision; the author revealed to Parker that he had also thought of setting his novel in New Orleans.

Angel Heart is set in 1955, whereas the events in the book take place in 1959. He explained, "The book is set in 1959 and I moved it to 1955 for a small but selfish reason. 1959 was on the way to the 1960s with its changing attitudes as well as environments. 1955 for me still belonged to the 1940s—and, because of the historical pause button of World War II, conceivably the 1930s—so quite simply, setting it in this year allowed me to give an older look to the film."

Other script changes from the novel involved characterization and dialogue. Parker sought to make Harry Angel a character that evoked sympathy. He said, "In the tradition of the down-at-heel gumshoe, his phlegmatic surface disguised an intelligence capable of unraveling a complicated, larger-than-life story with a degree of belief and conciseness. Also he had to be attractive to audiences while enlightening them, little by little, along the way."

Parker also established Angel as being born on February 14—Valentine's Day—the same date as his own birthday. He explained that it was "for no particular reason other than Valentine's Day might be easy to remember in a labyrinthine script and the heart reference seemed to have some resonance". Parker also wanted to create a realistic depiction of Louis Cyphre, as opposed to the character's "larger-than-life" personality in the novel. Another script change involved the ending and the identity of the killer. While Angel is framed for the murders (presumably by Cyphre) in the novel, Parker established the character as the killer for the film's ending.

=== Casting ===
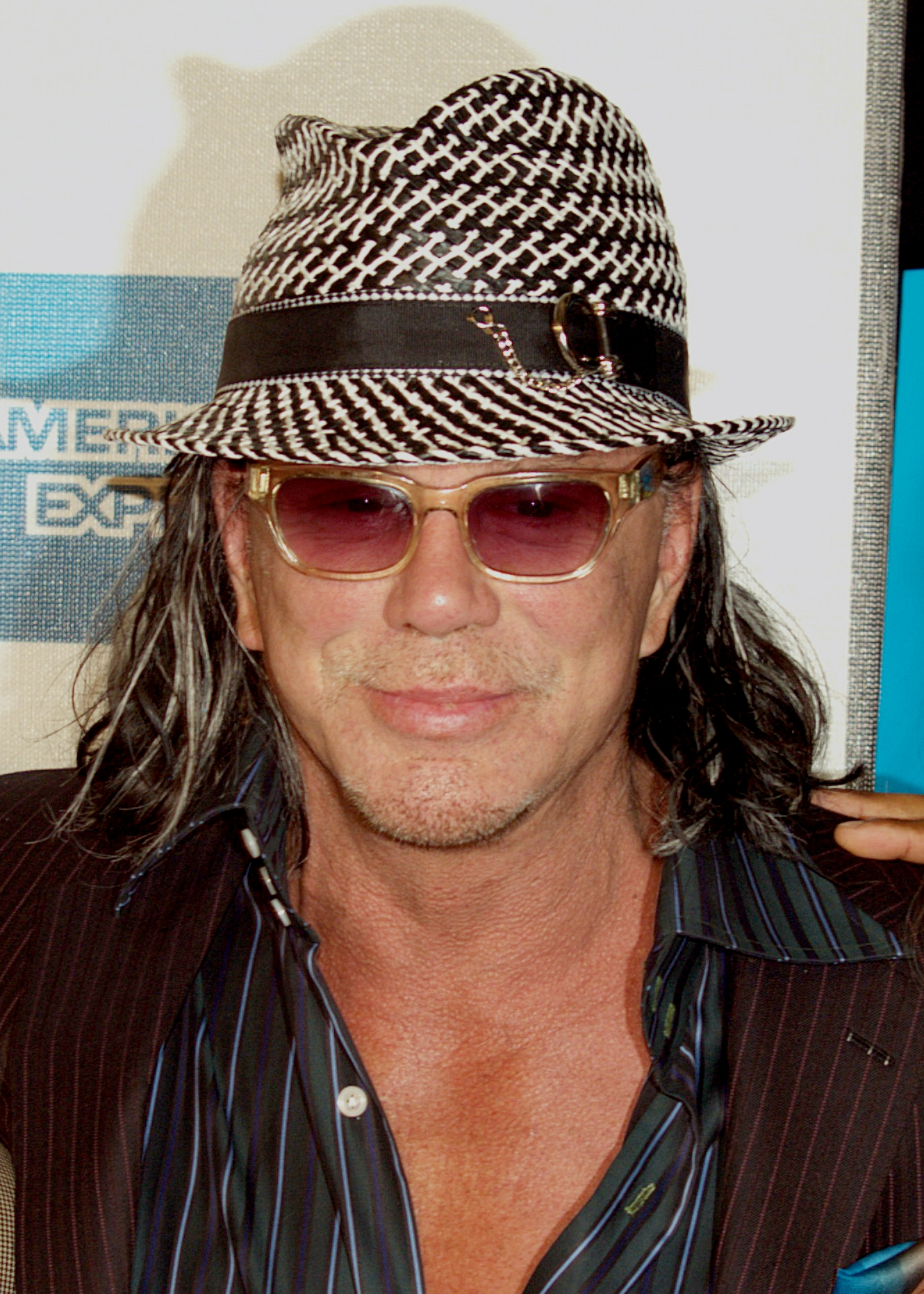
Mickey Rourke, who stars in the film

Parker originally wanted Robert De Niro to play the role of Harry Angel, but the actor expressed interest in making a cameo appearance as mysterious benefactor Louis Cyphre. De Niro, however, did not fully commit to the role until after frequent discussions with Parker. The director reflected, "I had been courting [De Niro] to play [Cyphre] in Angel Heart for some months and we had met a few times—and he had continued to bombard me with questions examining every dot and comma of my script. I had walked him through the locations we had found, read through the screenplay sitting on the floor of a dank, disused church in Harlem and finally he said 'yes'."

Jack Nicholson and Mickey Rourke were also considered for the role of Angel. Parker met with Nicholson in Los Angeles to discuss the project. Nicholson ultimately passed on the role. Parker said, "I did my pitch and he was most gracious, although, to be honest, he was quite distracted at the time... my movie and the possibility of him taking part seemed to slip from his immediate area of concentration and interest." Parker met with Rourke, who expressed a strong interest in playing Angel, and secured the leading role after a meeting with Parker in New York.

Various actresses auditioned for the role of Epiphany Proudfoot before Lisa Bonet secured the part. Bonet was known at the time for her role on the family-oriented sitcom The Cosby Show, and her casting in Angel Heart sparked significant controversy. Before securing the role, Bonet discussed it with Bill Cosby, who encouraged her decision to appear in the film.

Parker cast Bonet based on the strength of her audition and was unaware of her role on The Cosby Show. "I didn't hire [Bonet] because of The Cosby Show," he said. "I have never even seen the show. I hired her because she was right for the role." On preparing for the role, Bonet said, "I did a lot of meditation and a lot of self-inquiry. I did some research on voodoo. My earnest endeavor was really to let go of all my inhibitions. It was really necessary for me to be able to let go of Lisa and let Epiphany take over."

Parker had difficulty finding an actress for the role of Margaret Krusemark. "Although it's a small part in the film, the character is omnipresent in the dialogue and [the actress] had to have the right balance of class and eccentricity," he said. "I read many actresses for the part without much success." Rourke eventually suggested English actress Charlotte Rampling, who secured the role after Parker contacted her to discuss the part.

In January 1986, Parker held an open casting call at a New York nightclub known as The Kamikaze, with more than 1,400 people auditioning for various roles. "I managed to read a short scene with 600 of them as they were filtered through to me," he said. Actress Elizabeth Whitcraft, who had a small role in Parker's previous film Birdy, was cast as Connie, a journalist who aids Angel in his investigation.

Parker held another casting call in New Orleans, where he requested that local musicians audition for possible roles in the film. Clarence "Gatemouth" Brown and Deacon John Moore were among the many musicians who auditioned for roles. Moore was cast as Toots Sweet's bandmate. Parker returned to New York, where he auditioned other musicians, including Bo Diddley and Dizzy Gillespie. Blues guitarist Brownie McGhee, who plays Toots Sweet, was cast during the film's principal photography.

=== Filming ===
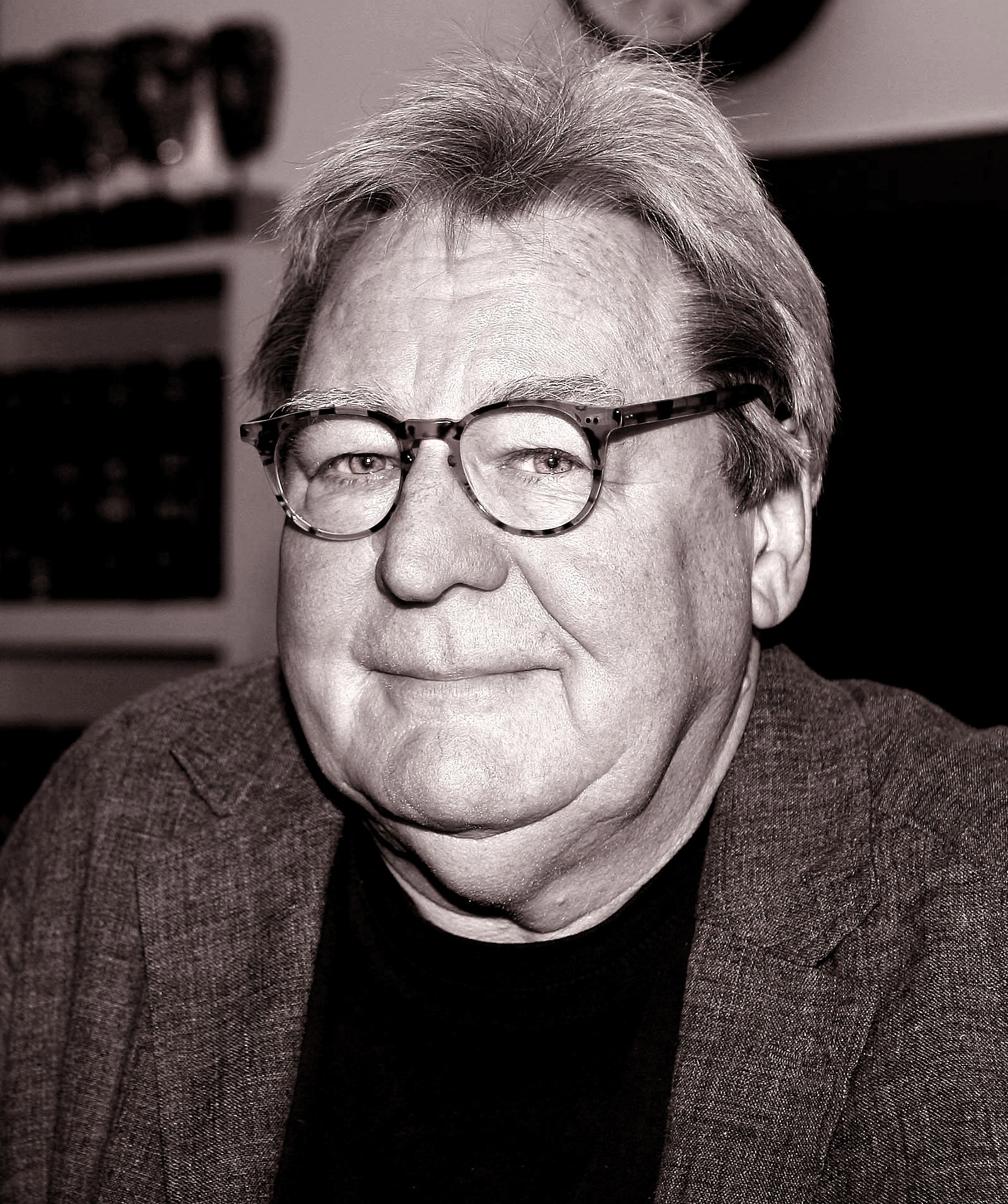
Alan Parker in 2012

During the casting process, Parker and producer Alan Marshall began scouting locations in New York City. The director looked at Harlem, believing that the neighborhood was "as un-photographed as other parts of New York are over-used". On January 20, 1986, he traveled to New Orleans, where he continued writing the script. Parker looked at unused buildings on Royal Street that would act as a hotel, and an abandoned house on Magazine Street that would serve as the home of Margaret Krusemark. He returned to New York City, where he looked at Staten Island and Coney Island. Parker's script for Angel Heart required a total of 78 locations be used for filming between New York and New Orleans.

Principal photography for Angel Heart began on March 31, 1986, and concluded on June 20, 1986, on a budget of $18 million. Filming began in Eldridge Street, Manhattan, New York City, which acted as Harry Angel's neighborhood. Production designer Brian Morris and the set-decorating team spent two months designing the set prior to filming, hoping to recreate 1950s New York. Because of the warm weather conditions, ice trucks were used to create fake snow. Filming moved to Alphabet City in Manhattan, where several bar scenes and Angel's intimate bedroom scene with Connie were filmed.

The production moved to Harlem to film a chase scene set during a procession before moving to Coney Island, where the cast and crew underwent severely cold weather conditions. The location was used to film a scene in which Angel questions Izzy about Johnny Favorite's whereabouts while Izzy's wife Bo stands waist deep in the ocean. The original actress who was cast as Bo was injured when she was knocked off her feet by a wave while delivering her first line. The actress refused to reshoot the scene, which led to her being replaced by her stand-in, whom Parker found to be a better actress for the role.

Production returned to Manhattan to film the opening credits sequence. Filming returned to Harlem, where a hospice was used to film a scene involving the character Spider Simpson, and many of the hospice's elderly residents acted as extras for the scene. On April 17, 1986, the production team moved to Staten Island to film exterior and interior scenes involving the character Dr. Fowler.

Filming moved to Hoboken, New Jersey, which doubled for a scene set in a New Orleans train station. From April 28 to April 29, 1986, the production team returned to Harlem, where Parker filmed Rourke and De Niro's scene in a Harlem mission. The two actors filmed a scene at Lanza's, an Italian restaurant located on the Lower East Side.

By May 3, 1986, production had moved to New Orleans. In the town of Thibodaux, Louisiana, Parker and his crew discovered an entire plantation workers' village that would serve as a graveyard. He said, "We had the good fortune to find an entire plantation workers' village almost intact and, with careful dressing, this became Epiphany's world. The graveyard was a dressed set, but much of what we filmed was already there."

An unused Louisiana field was used to create a racetrack where Angel meets the wealthy patriarch Ethan Krusemark. On May 13, the crew encountered some difficulty filming a chase scene involving Angel, for they had to deal with shying horses, trained dogs, gunshots, two hundred chickens and a horse specially trained to fall on top of Rourke's stuntman.

Production moved to Magazine Street, where production designer Brian Morris and the art department attempted to recreate 1950s New Orleans. Parker said of the set, "As in New York, we had dressed and clad every single storefront as far as the eye could see in order to be authentic to the period, and drained everything of all primary colours for our monochromatic look."

Filming moved to Jackson Square, where the crew filmed one of the final scenes in which Angel runs from Margaret's home. The production filmed a voodoo ceremony scene choreographed by Louis Falco. Falco, who had previously choreographed Parker's 1980 film Fame, based the scene on an actual Haitian ceremony.

The sex scene involving Rourke and Bonet was filmed in one of the unused buildings located on Royal Street and took four hours to shoot. Parker limited the crew to himself, cinematographer Michael Seresin, camera operator Michael Roberts, and the camera assistant. To make the actors more comfortable, Parker played music during the shoot.

Production moved to a corner of New Orleans, which doubled for flashback sequences set in 1943 Times Square. The crew discovered an unused bus depot, which was used to film scenes set in Ethan Krusemark's gumbo hut. Filming moved to the St. Alphonsus Church, where the crew filmed a dialogue scene between Angel and Cyphre. Production returned to Royal Street in the French Quarter, where the final confrontation between Angel and Cyphre, as well as the film's ending were shot.

=== Editing and censorship ===
[The MPAA] can't ban a movie but this is, in a way, blackmail. I think I'm a responsible film maker. I had complete creative freedom, so if there's anything offensive about Angel Heart, I'm responsible for it.

— Parker on the MPAA's decision to give Angel Heart an X rating.

After filming concluded in June 1986, Parker spent four months editing the film in Europe, with 400,000 feet of film and 1,100 different shots. The Motion Picture Association of America (MPAA) gave the original cut of Angel Heart an X rating, which is widely associated with pornographic films. The board expressed concerns over several seconds of the sex scene involving Rourke and Bonet in which Rourke's buttocks are seen thrusting in a sexual motion. Parker appealed the rating but did not receive the two-thirds vote that was required to reclassify the film to an R rating.

The film's distributor Tri-Star Pictures refused to release it with an X rating, for the film would have fewer theaters that were willing to book it and fewer venues for advertising; Steve Randall, executive vice president of marketing for Tri-Star, stated that it was the studio's "firm policy not to release an X-rated film".

With only a few weeks before the film's release, the studio was desperate for the less-restrictive R rating, but Parker was reluctant to alter the film. He filed another appeal, on which the board voted 8-to-6 in favor of the X rating. Parker subsequently removed ten seconds of sexual content from the scene. "That scene was very complex, very intricate, and the cutting quite rapid, involving 60 to 80 cuts in the space of about two minutes," he said. "Eventually, I cut only 10 seconds from the scene, or about 14 feet of film." On February 24, 1987, the film was granted an R rating. Parker later stated that the MPAA's concerns led to "a wasteful, pointless and expensive exercise".

=== Music ===
The score was produced and composed by Trevor Jones, with saxophone solos by British jazz musician Courtney Pine. Parker hired Jones based on his work for the 1986 film Runaway Train. After meeting with the director, Jones viewed a rough cut version of the film. He stated, "When I sat in the screening room all by myself and began to see those images, I was shaking like a puppy when the movie ended and when I got out of the room I told [Parker] that it was a great picture, but that I didn’t understand what exactly he wanted from me. He told me that he expected me to deliver something special to the picture and… to approach the movie from whenever I chose."

For the score, Jones wanted to explore the concept of evil, explaining, "Evil is the greatest of human fears… I tried to give that feeling to the score using daily ordinary music that would bridge the world of [Harry Angel] to that which he's getting into, the black magic, his search. It was like a psychological journey for me always trying to relate to the fears and emotions of the audience."

He composed the score electronically on a Synclavier. Parker chose Glen Gray's 1937 song "Girl of My Dreams" as a recurring song performed by the unseen character Johnny Favorite. He wanted the song to act as a motif that would haunt viewers as it had haunted Harry Angel. Jones incorporated elements of the song into his score.

In addition to Jones's compositions, the soundtrack features a number of blues and R&B performances, including "Honeyman Blues" by Bessie Smith, and "Soul on Fire" by LaVern Baker. Brownie McGhee performed the songs "The Right Key, but the Wrong Keyhole" and "Rainy Rainy Day" for the film, with Lilian Boutté acting as a vocalist. Jones stated, "…the main bulk of the score was worked on with a Synclavier. Basically there were two types of music, one was the electronic stuff from the Synclavier that [Parker] wanted, and the real jazz musicians. The two work very well together in view of the film's intent."

During post-production, Jones mixed the music tracks at Angel Recording Studios, a recording studio built in an abandoned church in Islington, North London, with final mixing taking place at Warner Hollywood Studios in Los Angeles. Parker said, "One of the great advantages of working with contemporary recording techniques is that we can mix onto film in a recording studio with all of the various components and options of modern, multi-track recordings. I've always been very mistrustful of conventional scoring, whereby a hundred musicians sit in front of the projected film and the conductor strikes up the orchestra." A motion picture soundtrack album was released by the recording labels Antilles Records and Island Records.

== Release ==
In North America, Angel Heart opened in wide release on March 6, 1987, distributed by TriStar Pictures. The film debuted at number four at the weekend box office, garnering ticket sales of $3,688,721 from 815 screens, with an average of $4,526 per theater. The film's overall domestic gross was $17.2 million against a production budget of $18 million.

== Reception ==
The review aggregation website Rotten Tomatoes gave Angel Heart a score of 82% based on a sample of 34 reviews, with an average score of 7.4/10. The site's consensus reads: "Angel Heart lures viewers into its disturbing, brutal mystery with authentic noir flair and a palpably hypnotic mood". Audiences polled by CinemaScore gave the film an average grade of "B–" on a scale of A+ to F.

William Hjortsberg, author of Falling Angel, voiced his support for the film adaptation, stating, "[Alan] Parker wrote an excellent script and went on to make a memorable film. Casting Robert De Niro as Cyphre was a brilliant touch."

Although initially supportive of Bonet's decision to appear in the film, Bill Cosby dismissed Angel Heart as "a movie made by white America that cast a black girl, gave her voodoo things to do and have sex".

The Hollywood Reporter indicated that reviewers generally praised Rourke's performance, as well as the score, cinematography and production design, while criticism was aimed at Parker's screenwriting for being convoluted and exposition-heavy.

Vincent Canby of The New York Times praised the cinematography and production design, but criticized Rourke's performance as being "suitably intense, but to such little effect".

Rita Kempley of The Washington Post wrote that Angel Heart "is over-stylized, and we're over-stimulated when the soundtrack goes berserk, from a few thumpity-thumps to a visceral, ventricles a-pumping score".

Pauline Kael of The New Yorker criticized Parker's direction: "There's no way to separate the occult from the incomprehensible... Parker simply doesn't have the gift of making evil seductive, and he edits like a flasher." Kael also criticized De Niro's cameo appearance, writing, "It's the sort of guest appearance that lazy big actors delight in—they can show up the local talent."

On the syndicated television program Siskel & Ebert & the Movies, Gene Siskel gave Angel Heart a "thumbs down", while his colleague Roger Ebert praised the film and gave it a "thumbs up". In his review for the Chicago Tribune, Siskel wrote that "Parker seems more concerned with style and with hiding the film's big mystery than with pacing". Siskel also criticized the film's controversial sex scene for not being "as shocking as the rating board would have you believe". Ebert, writing for the Chicago Sun-Times, gave the film three-and-a-half stars out of four, writing that "Angel Heart is a thriller and a horror movie, but most of all it's an exuberant exercise in style, in which Parker and his actors have fun taking it to the limit".

Ian Nathan of Empire magazine called the film "a diabolical treat with Rourke and De Niro in top form".

Almar Haflidason of the BBC wrote, "The movie maintains intrigue at every turn and Rourke is spellbinding. Robert De Niro, Charlotte Rampling, and the assembled cast are all excellent. But this is Mickey Rourke's movie, and he puts in a mesmerising performance."

Richard Luck, writing for Film4, concluded in his review, "The book's so good it deserves a better movie, but Rourke's performance is such that Angel Heart stands out from the necromancy movie crowd."

=== Cultural impact ===
Filmmaker Christopher Nolan stated that the film was a major influence on his 2000 film Memento: "In terms of Memento, Alan Parker films such as Angel Heart and The Wall, which use very interesting editing techniques such as a fractured narrative, were a big influence."

In 2010, Wired magazine ranked the film at number 22 on their list of "The 25 Best Horror Films of All Time", and in 2012, Mark Hughes, writing for Forbes, ranked Angel Heart at number nine on his list of the "Top 10 Best Cult Classic Horror Movies of All Time".

Den of Geek writer Ryan Lambie ranked the film at number six on his list of "The Top 20 Underappreciated Films of 1987", writing, "Parker brings a wonderfully shadowy quality to his noir thriller, which takes in New York and New Orleans. Some viewers may be able to predict where this twisty, murky thriller's going to take them, but the ride remains one worth taking thanks to the quality of the acting and direction."

Film critic Tim Dirks of the film-review website Filmsite added the film to his list of films featuring the "Greatest Film Plot Twists, Film Spoilers and Surprise Endings", based on two of the film's major plot twists—Harry Angel being revealed as Johnny Favorite, and Louis Cyphre revealing himself as Lucifer.

Arnaud Dephalese, in a 2026 study about trauma in American cinema, sees this movie as a commentary of broad scope— historical, cultural, and philosophical — on American civilization, viewed from an outside perspective by British director Alan Parker.

Screen Rant writer Tim Butters rated Robert De Niro's performance as "One of the 10 Best Movie Depictions of the Devil".

=== Accolades ===
Angel Heart received several awards and nominations following its release. At the 10th Jupiter Awards, Mickey Rourke won a Jupiter Award for Best International Actor for his performances in both Angel Heart and A Prayer for the Dying (1987).

At the 9th Youth in Film Awards, Lisa Bonet won the Young Artist Award for Best Young Female Superstar in Motion Pictures.

At the 15th Saturn Awards, Angel Heart received three Saturn Award nominations, though it failed to win any.

List of awards and nominations received
Award	Category	Recipient(s) and nominee(s)	Result
15th Saturn Awards	Best Supporting Actor	Robert De Niro	Nominated
15th Saturn Awards	Best Supporting Actress	Lisa Bonet	Nominated
15th Saturn Awards	Best Writing	Alan Parker	Nominated
10th Jupiter Awards	Best International Actor	Mickey Rourke	Won (Note: Rourke won the award for his performances in both Angel Heart and A Prayer for the Dying.)
9th Youth in Film Awards	Best Young Female Superstar in Motion Pictures	Lisa Bonet	Won

=== Home video ===
Angel Heart was released on VHS on September 24, 1987, by International Video Entertainment (IVE). The releases include the R-rated theatrical cut and an uncut, unrated version that restores the ten seconds of sexual content that was removed to satisfy the MPAA. Ralph King, senior vice president of IVE, said, "The scene cut from Angel Heart is both provocative and shocking, but it is by no means pornographic. We're pleased to give the public the opportunity to see the film as Alan Parker originally meant the film to be viewed." The unrated version sold four times as many copies as the R rated version.

The film debuted on DVD on June 23, 1998, by Artisan Entertainment. Special features on the DVD include a theatrical trailer, production notes, a "making-of" featurette, and information on the cast and crew. The DVD release received criticism for its poor video transfer and shortage of special features. Artisan Entertainment released the film on Laserdisc on August 18, 1998.

Lionsgate Home Entertainment re-released Angel Heart on a "Special Edition" DVD on May 18, 2004. The Special Edition features additional material, including an introduction and audio commentary by Parker, a scene-specific commentary by Rourke, a video interview with the actor, and the theatrical trailer. Lionsgate released the film on Blu-ray on November 24, 2009. The Blu-ray presents the film in 1080p high definition and contains all the additional materials found on the Special Edition DVD.

On July 12, 2022, Lionsgate released the film on 4K Ultra HD in the United States.

== TV version ==
An edited television version was produced that removes the more graphic elements of the sex scenes. In particular, the sex scene with Mickey Rourke and Lisa Bonet is re-edited and features additional footage that is not included in any of the MPAA-rated versions. The additional footage features flashbacks of a drunken party with several scantily clad women at the barracks where Johnny Favorite was stationed prior to it being hit by a series of explosions. The sequence ends with a brief shot of Epiphany Proudfoot's body burning amongst a pile of charred rubble.

== Cancelled remake ==
In 2008, it was announced that producers Michael De Luca, Alison Rosenzweig and Michael Gaeta were developing a planned remake of Angel Heart that would be produced by De Luca's production banner, Michael De Luca Productions. The producers had optioned the rights to both the film and the novel Falling Angel. De Luca expressed that he was a fan of the novel, stating, "It's a great blend of genres with a great Faustian bargain, compelling, universal themes and a rare combination of literary and commercial appeal." However, nothing has been heard of this project since a brief Filmstalker website article in May 2009.

== See also ==
- List of cult films
