= Falling Angel =

Book by William Hjortsberg

- First edition
- Author: William Hjortsberg
- Language: English
- Publisher: Harcourt Brace Jovanovich
- Publication date: 1978
- Publication place: United States
- Media type: Print
- OCLC: 873367495
- Preceded by: Toro! Toro! Toro! (1974)
- Followed by: Tales & Fables (1985)

Falling Angel is a 1978 horror novel by American writer William Hjortsberg. Written in a hardboiled detective style with supernatural themes, it was adapted into the 1987 film Angel Heart.

== Background ==
Falling Angel came out to a muted reception in hardback in 1978, but gained a much wider audience the following year with its paperback release. It was eventually followed by Angel's Inferno, published posthumously in 2020, in which Harry Angel attempts to make sense of his past and track down his greatest enemy.

== Plot ==
The plot unrolls in New York state in 1959. Down and out private investigator Harry Angel is hired by a mysterious client, Louis Cyphre, via the law firm of Herman Winesap, to find a missing crooner named Johnny Favorite.

Johnny Favorite rose to swift fame before the Second World War, but has not been seen since he was critically wounded during a 1943 Luftwaffe raid on Allied forces in Tunisia, after which he was returned to the US in a vegetative state. Cyphre has received information that Favorite may be a patient at the Emma Dodd Harvest Memorial Clinic in Poughkeepsie, but has not been allowed access to him.

After some investigation, Angel discovers that Favorite was indeed a patient at the clinic, but was released into the care of a man called Edward Kelly. Angel searches New York for Kelly and the rest of Favorite's old friends, an investigation that leads him into a disturbing occult milieu. He learns that Favorite's girlfriend, Margaret Krusemark, is an occultist and practitioner of black magic, as was Favorite himself; legend has it that the crooner once conjured the Devil during a Black Mass. As one by one, Favorite's old associates are murdered during the course of the enquiry, Angel begins to fear that he is being framed for their deaths.

Finally, Angel is confronted with the truth: that he himself is Johnny Favorite. Having summoned the Devil during a Black Mass and agreed to trade his soul for fame and success in the music business, he rose to fame as a singer, but his career was cut short by the war. Left with amnesia after his injury in 1943, and with the help of his friends, he has reinvented himself in order to escape his contract with Louis Cyphre - or Lucifer. Since then, Cyphre has been tracking him, killing all his old friends and leading him to this moment of discovery. The book culminates in Angel's arrest for the murders, for which there is conclusive evidence of his guilt.

== Reception ==
The novel was enthusiastically received on publication. Rafe McGregor describes Falling Angel as "exemplary occult detection." Stephen King is quoted as having described it: "as if Raymond Chandler had written The Exorcist."

Other reviews:

- Review by Stanley Wiater in Fangoria, August 1982
- Review by Karl Edward Wagner in Rod Serling's The Twilight Zone Magazine, May–June 1983; reprinted in The Weird Fiction Review, Fall 2024
- Review by John Duffty in Paperback Inferno, vol. 7, no. 4
- Review by William F. Nolan in Horror: 100 Best Books (1988)
- Review by Witold Jabłoński (1998) in Talizman #4-5 1998, p. 140 (in Polish)

== Adaptations ==
The book was adapted into a 1987 mystery-thriller film entitled Angel Heart starring Mickey Rourke, Robert De Niro, and Lisa Bonet. The film was written and directed by Alan Parker. It was also adapted into an opera by J. Mark Scearce to a libretto by Lucy Thurber. Titled Falling Angel, it premiered at the Brevard Music Center on June 30, 2016, after having initially been commissioned by the Center for Contemporary Opera in New York. The novel was serialized in digest version in Playboy magazine in 1978, winner of Playboy Editorial Award for Best Major Work.

In May 2026, it was announced that HBO and A24 are developing a series, based on Falling Angel and the sequel Angel's Inferno (2020) by Hjortsberg, with Zac Efron attached to star and Zach Baylin serving as writer. Jonathan van Tulleken is expected to direct several episodes of the series.
