= William Hjortsberg =

American writer (1941–2017)

- Born: February 23, 1941; New York City, U.S.
- Died: April 22, 2017 (aged 76); Livingston, Montana, U.S.
- Occupations: Novelist, screenwriter
- Writing career
- Genres: Mystery, screenwriting
- Website: williamhjortsberg.com

William Reinhold "Gatz" Hjortsberg (February 23, 1941 – April 22, 2017) was an American novelist and screenwriter, who wrote the screenplay of the film Legend.

His novel Falling Angel was the basis for the film Angel Heart (1987). The novel was adapted into an opera in 2015, composed by J. Mark Scearce with a libretto by Lucy Thurber.

== Personal life and death ==
Hjortsberg was the only child of a Swedish restaurateur father and a Swiss mother. He attended Dartmouth College, the Yale School of Drama (where he met Thomas McGuane), and was a Stegner Fellow at Stanford University. He was married three times, and had a son and a daughter. He died of pancreatic cancer on April 22, 2017, at the age of 76.

== Angel Heart ==
His fifth book, "Falling Angel" published in 1978 was later turned into a 1987 movie called "Angel Heart" starring Mickey Rourke as the main character and Robert De Niro and Lisa Bonet in supporting roles. While the movie was based on the novel, several changes from the original material were made.

In 2020, a sequel to Falling Angel, Angel's Inferno, was posthumously published.

== Novels ==
- Alp (1969)
- Gray Matters (1971)
- Symbiography (1973)
- Toro! Toro! Toro! (1974)
- Falling Angel (1978)
- Tales & Fables (1985), published by Sylvester & Orphanos
- Nevermore (1994)
- Mañana (2015), a thriller set in Mexico.
- Angel's Inferno (2020)

== Screenplays ==
- Thunder and Lightning (1977)
- The Georgia Peaches (1980) (TV)
- Legend (1985)
- Mandrake the Magician (Unproduced)

== Nonfiction ==
- Hjortsberg, William (2012). Jubilee Hitchhiker: The Life and Times of Richard Brautigan. Counterpoint Press. ISBN 9781582437903. A biography of writer Richard Brautigan.
