= Gray Matters (novel) =

1971 novel by William Hjortsberg

- First edition (publ. Simon & Schuster); Cover art by Paul Bacon
- Author: William Hjortsberg
- Genre: Science fiction
- Publisher: Simon & Schuster
- Publication date: 1971

Gray Matters is a science fiction novel by William Hjortsberg.

== Plot summary ==
World War III has devastated most of the world, but life is still good for the lucky (and rich) few hundred persons who had their brains preserved in an automated conservatory. Although they have no bodies to move around with, they are free to mentally visit any of the other residents, and engage in all the emotional, intellectual and (pseudo-) sexual congress that they desire.

== Reception ==
The book was serialized in Playboy, and won the Playboy Editorial Award.

== Release details ==
- 1971, USA, Simon & Schuster (1st Edition)
