= William Wharton (author) =

American author

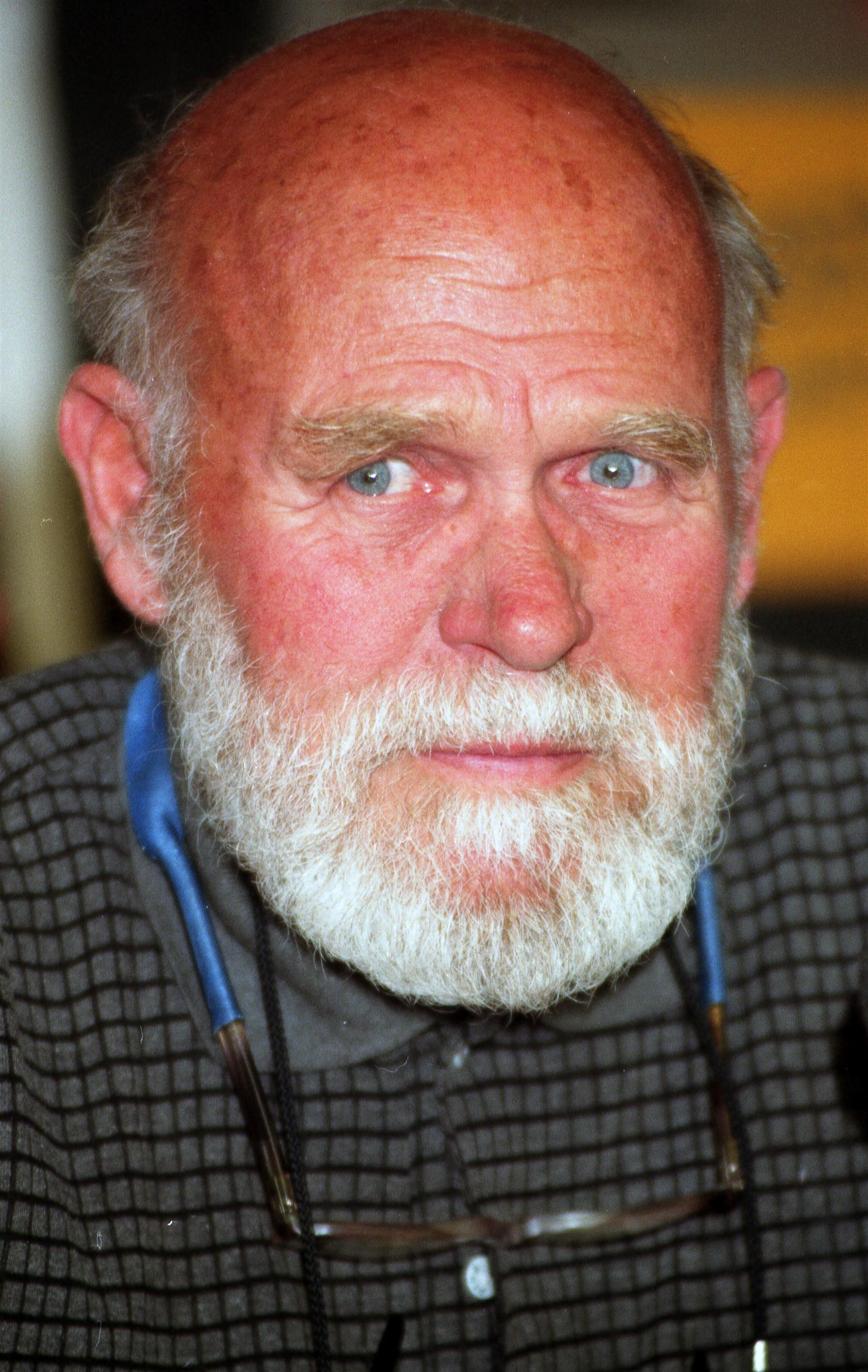
- Wharton in 1999
- Born: Albert William Du Aime; 7 November 1925; Philadelphia, Pennsylvania, U.S.
- Died: 29 October 2008 (aged 82); Encinitas, California, U.S.
- Education: University of California, Los Angeles (BA, MA, PhD)
- Writing career
- Period: 1978–2008
- Genre: Popular fiction
- Notable awards: National Book Award

Albert William Du Aime (pronounced /duːˈɛm/; November 7, 1925 – October 29, 2008), more commonly known by his pen name William Wharton, was an American-born author best known for his first novel Birdy, which was also made into a critically acclaimed film of the same name in 1984.

== Early life, family, and education ==
Wharton was born in Philadelphia, Pennsylvania, to "a poor, hard-working, Catholic family". He graduated from Upper Darby High School in 1943. (He was inducted into the school's Wall of Fame in 1997.)

During World War II, Wharton served in the United States Army and was first assigned to an engineering unit. He was transferred to the infantry and was severely wounded in the Battle of the Bulge. His memoirs included an account of his role in the killing of German prisoners during the war. "War for me, though brief, had been a soul-shaking trauma. I was scared, miserable, and I lost confidence in human beings, especially myself."

Wharton met his future wife, Rosemary Henry, while on leave in California before deploying to France for the Normandy invasion. After his discharge, he attended the University of California, Los Angeles, where he received an undergraduate degree in art and a doctorate in psychology. He married Rosemary in 1955.

== Career ==
Wharton taught art in the Los Angeles Unified School District for 11 years. He moved with his family to Europe in 1960, ultimately settling in Paris where he worked as an impressionist painter, selling his paintings on the street while his wife Rosemary taught at the American School of Paris.

Wharton wrote three novels during this time, including his first published novel, Birdy. A friend who admired Birdy showed the manuscript to the agent Rosalie Siegel, who sold it to Knopf and then Avon in paperback for $525,000. Wharton chose his pen name by combining his middle name and mother's maiden name; William Wharton was also the name of a maternal uncle who died in World War I. Wharton chose to write pseudonymously to protect his private life and avoid the possibility of becoming an American literary celebrity. Published in 1978, Birdy was a critical and popular success and it won the US National Book Award in category First Novel. Alan Parker directed a film version starring Nicolas Cage and Matthew Modine.

After the publication of Birdy and through the early 1990s, Wharton published eight novels, including Dad and A Midnight Clear, both of which were also made into films. Dad starred Jack Lemmon and Ethan Hawke in one of his first movie roles. Hawke also starred in A Midnight Clear.

In 1988, Wharton's daughter, Kate, her husband, Bill, and their two children, two-year-old Dayiel and eight-month-old Mia, were killed in a 23-car motor vehicle accident near Albany, Oregon, caused by smoke generated by grass-burning on nearby farmland. Wharton wrote a (mostly) non-fiction book, Ever After: A Father's True Story (1995), which recounts the incidents leading to the accident, his family's subsequent grief, and the three years which he devoted to pursuing redress in the Oregon court system for the field-burning that caused the accident. Houseboat on the Seine, a memoir, was published in 1996, about Wharton's purchase and renovation of a houseboat.

Wharton gained an enormous popularity in Poland, where many extra editions of his books as well as visits followed. Eventually, many of Wharton's works were translated and published exclusively in the Polish language (see the Bibliography).

== Personal life and death ==
Wharton married his wife, teacher Rosemary du Aime (née Henry), in 1955. The couple had four children; their eldest Kate died in 1988. Wharton died on 29 October 2008 in a hospital in Encinitas, California from an infection contracted while hospitalized for blood-pressure problems.

== Books ==
=== Novels ===
- Birdy. New York: Alfred A. Knopf. 1978. ISBN 978-0-394-42569-6.
- Dad. New York: Alfred A. Knopf. 1981. ISBN 978-0-394-51097-2.
- A Midnight Clear. New York: Alfred A. Knopf. 1982. ISBN 978-0-394-51967-8.
- Scumbler. New York: Alfred A. Knopf. 1984. ISBN 978-0-394-53574-6.
- Pride. New York: Alfred A. Knopf. 1985. ISBN 978-0-394-53636-1.
- Tidings. New York: Henry Holt and Company. 1987. ISBN 978-0-8050-0532-5.
- Franky Furbo. New York: Henry Holt and Company. 1989. ISBN 978-0-8050-1120-3.
- Last Lovers. New York: Farrar, Straus & Giroux. 1991. ISBN 978-0-374-18389-9.
- Opowieści z Moulin du Bruit (in Polish). Translated by Kabat-Hyżak, Joanna; Hyżak, Szymon. Poznań: Dom Wydawniczy Rebis. 1997. ISBN 978-83-7120-513-2.
- Al (in Polish). Translated by Fordoński, Krzysztof. Poznań: Dom Wydawniczy Rebis. 1999. ISBN 978-83-7120-732-7.
  - Ал (in Bulgarian). Translated by Велчев, Васил. Bulgaria: Сиела. 2019. ISBN 978-954-28-2862-4.
- Tam, gdzie spotykają się wszystkie światy (in Polish). Translated by Batko, Zbigniew. Poznań: Dom Wydawniczy Rebis. 2000. ISBN 978-83-7120-893-5.
  - Отвъд килера (in Bulgarian). Translated by Стоименов, Милко. Bulgaria: Рата. 2007. ISBN 9789549608335.
- Nigdy, nigdy mnie nie złapiecie (in Polish). Translated by Wietecki, Jacek. Poznań: Dom Wydawniczy Rebis. 2001. ISBN 978-83-7301-031-4.
- Niedobre miejsce (in Polish). Translated by Kruk, Paweł. Poznań: Dom Wydawniczy Rebis. 2001. ISBN 978-83-7301-110-6.
- Rubio (in Polish). Translated by Batko, Zbigniew. Poznań: Dom Wydawniczy Rebis. 2003. ISBN 978-83-7301-323-0.

=== Non-fiction ===
- Wrongful Deaths. London: Granta Books. 1994. ISBN 978-0-14-014236-5.
  - Ever After: A Father's True Story. New York: Newmarket Press. 1995. ISBN 978-1-55704-223-1.
- Houseboat on the Seine: A Memoir. New York: Newmarket Press. 1996. ISBN 978-1-55704-272-9.
- Szrapnel (in Polish). Translated by Fordoński, Krzysztof. Poznań: Dom Wydawniczy Rebis. 1996. ISBN 978-83-7120-394-7.
  - Shrapnel. London: The Friday Project. 2012. ISBN 978-0-00-745807-3.
- Historie rodzinne (in Polish). Translated by Brydak, Wojsław. Poznań: Dom Wydawniczy Rebis. 1998. ISBN 978-83-7120-611-5.
- William Wharton (reproductions of 62 paintings) (in Polish). Poznań: Dom Wydawniczy Rebis. 1998. ISBN 978-83-7120-690-0.
- Nie ustawaj w biegu (in Polish). Translated by Batko, Zbigniew. Poznań: Dom Wydawniczy Rebis. 2002. ISBN 978-83-7301-277-6.

== Movies based on Wharton's books ==
- Birdy (1984)
- Dad (1989)
- A Midnight Clear (1992)
