= Nevermore (novel) =

1995 novel by William Hjortsberg

- Author: William Hjortsberg
- Set in: 1923 New York City
- Publisher: Atlantic Monthly Press
- Publication date: 1994
- ISBN: 978-0-87113-579-7

Nevermore is a 1994 historical mystery novel by American author William Hjortsberg. In the novel, Harry Houdini joins forces with Arthur Conan Doyle to solve a series of murders, which eerily re-enact the stories of Edgar Allan Poe.

Publishers Weekly considered the novel "droll and captivating" with "stellar characters and (an) outlandish plot". The Los Angeles Times noted Hjortsberg's "obvious delight in historical detail,; similarly, the New York Times observed that Hjorstberg "was obviously out to have a good time" in writing the novel, concluding that as a result, readers would similarly enjoy it.
