= Elizabeth Whitcraft =

American actress

Elizabeth Whitcraft is an American actress who played small parts in some notable American films in the 1980s and 1990s. She was often credited as Liza Whitcraft or Liz Whitcraft.

== Career ==
Her break came in 1984, where she had a supporting role in the film Birdy. She then worked in several films that starred Robert De Niro, Angel Heart (1987), and Goodfellas (1990) (the girlfriend of Joe Pesci's character). In 1988, she played a slightly more notable role as the naked woman caught with Alec Baldwin's character in Working Girl.

Whitcraft also did a few TV guest spots on the series Spenser For Hire (1985) and Quantum Leap (1989).

After co-starring in the drama Object of Obsession in 1995, Whitcraft left the acting profession. However, she did make a brief acting appearance as a fashion stylist in George Clooney's HBO TV series Unscripted (2005).

== Post-acting life ==
As of January 2020, she was working as an interior designer in Los Angeles.

== Filmography ==
- Birdy (1984) - Rosanne
- Angel Heart (1987) - Connie
- Spenser: For Hire (1988, TV Series) - Annie
- Working Girl (1988) - Doreen DiMucci
- Jake and the Fatman – (1990, TV Series) - Sandy (as Liza Whitcraft)
- Goodfellas (1990) - Tommy's Girlfriend at Copa
- Quantum Leap (1991, TV Series) - Sandy
- Where Sleeping Dogs Lie (1992) - Serena's Secretary (as Liza Whitcraft)
- Inside Out II (1992) - Sarah - segment "Some Guys Have All The Luck" (as Liza Whitcraft)
- Eden (1993, TV Series) - Val
- Object of Obsession (1994) - Christy (as Liza Whitcraft)
- Unscripted (2005, TV Series) - (as Liza Whitcraft)
