= Dad (1989 film) =

1989 film by Gary David Goldberg

- Theatrical release poster
- Directed by: Gary David Goldberg
- Written by: Gary David Goldberg
- Based on: Dad by William Wharton
- Produced by: Gary David Goldberg; Joseph Stern
- Starring: Jack Lemmon; Ted Danson; Olympia Dukakis; Kathy Baker; Kevin Spacey; Ethan Hawke
- Cinematography: Jan Kiesser
- Edited by: Eric A. Sears
- Music by: James Horner
- Production companies: Amblin Entertainment; Ubu Productions
- Distributed by: Universal Pictures
- Release date: October 27, 1989
- Running time: 117 minutes
- Country: United States
- Language: English
- Budget: $19 million
- Box office: $27 million

Dad is a 1989 American comedy-drama film written and directed by Gary David Goldberg, and starring Jack Lemmon, Ted Danson, Olympia Dukakis, Kathy Baker, Kevin Spacey, and Ethan Hawke. It is based on William Wharton's 1981 novel. The original music score was composed by James Horner. The film was produced by Amblin Entertainment and distributed by Universal Pictures.

== Plot ==
John Tremont is a busy executive. He learns during a meeting that his mother Bette has suffered a heart attack and been rushed to the hospital. Flying immediately to Los Angeles, he ends up becoming a caretaker of his father Jake while Bette is recovering. A retired aerospace industry worker, Jake has become somewhat feeble and totally reliant on his wife, so John attempts to get him more involved in day-to-day things like taking care of the house.

Father and son bond. John invites his dad to a business meeting and takes him out for a Bingo game. They play catch with a baseball in the yard. Late one night, college-aged grandson Billy turns up as well. John begins to appreciate while spending quality time with his dad that he has been neglecting his own son.

Bette returns home from the hospital. She is a strong, willful woman with little personal warmth. Jake is happy to have everyone around him again during family dinners with the kids, including daughter Annie and son-in-law Mario, but the glum Bette resents the intrusion. One day, Jake discovers blood in his urine and is taken to a doctor. John has a single request at the hospital — to avoid the word "cancer," which terrifies his dad. An arrogant doctor named Santana who feels he knows what is best decides that a patient has a right to know, and tells Jake. Jake immediately loses his bearings and ends up in a coma.

A fiercely protective John stays by his father's side constantly and a more sympathetic doctor named Chad volunteers his help. Jake unexpectedly wakes up one day and seems perfectly fine. Upon coming home, Jake acts reborn and reinvigorated. He confuses his wife by dressing in an odd manner, studying new languages, visiting the neighbors and even wanting sex at night. John feels his dad is just trying to enjoy life, something his bitter mother seems incapable of doing. Something more is definitely wrong with Jake, however. He is having delusions about being the head of a different family on a far-away farm.

A psychiatrist concludes that Jake sought joy in a fantasy world while being unable to experience a sufficient amount in his own. Jake has a relapse. In the hospital, he reminisces with his son about things that made him happiest, like work and baseball, before dying. John, a better man for the experience, returns to his old life.

== Cast ==
- Jack Lemmon as Jake Tremont
  - Lemmon's son Chris played Young Jake in flashbacks
- Ted Danson as John Tremont
  - Justin Peterson as Young John
- Olympia Dukakis as Bette Tremont
  - Gina Raymond as Young Bette
- Kathy Baker as Annie Tremont
  - Sprague Grayden as Young Annie
- Kevin Spacey as Mario
- Ethan Hawke as Billy Tremont
- Zakes Mokae as Dr. Chad
- J. T. Walsh as Dr. Santana
- Peter Michael Goetz as Dr. Ethridge
- Richard McGonagle as Victor Walton

== Reception ==
=== Critical response ===
Dad currently holds a 58% rating on website Rotten Tomatoes, based on 12 critics with a weighted average of 5.5/10. Hal Hinson of The Washington Post wrote, "Dad is a melodramatic plumbing of the relationship between two generations of fathers and sons, and it runs through nearly the entire gamut of emotionally loaded issues, from infirmity and senility to reconciliation and death."

=== Accolades ===
Jack Lemmon received much critical acclaim for his performance. He was nominated for a Golden Globe Award. The film was nominated in 1990 for the Academy Award for Best Makeup (Ken Diaz, Greg Nelson and Dick Smith), which went to Driving Miss Daisy.
