= A Midnight Clear =

1992 film by Keith Gordon

- Theatrical release poster
- Directed by: Keith Gordon
- Screenplay by: Keith Gordon
- Based on: A Midnight Clear by William Wharton
- Produced by: Bill Borden; Dale Pollock; Armyan Bernstein; Tom Rosenberg; Marc Abraham
- Starring: Ethan Hawke; Kevin Dillon; Arye Gross; Peter Berg; Gary Sinise; Frank Whaley; John C. McGinley
- Cinematography: Tom Richmond
- Edited by: Don Brochu
- Music by: Mark Isham
- Production companies: Beacon; A&M Films
- Distributed by: InterStar Releasing (United States); Sovereign Pictures (International)
- Release date: April 24, 1992
- Running time: 108 minutes
- Country: United States
- Language: English
- Budget: $5 million
- Box office: $1,526,697

A Midnight Clear is a 1992 American war drama film written and directed by Keith Gordon, and starring an ensemble cast that features Ethan Hawke, Gary Sinise, Peter Berg, Kevin Dillon, and Arye Gross. It is based on the novel by William Wharton. Set toward the end of World War II, the film tells the story of an American intelligence unit that finds a German platoon that wishes to surrender.

== Plot ==
In the early phase of the Battle of the Bulge in December 1944, a small US Army intelligence and reconnaissance squad, selected for their high IQs, is sent to occupy a deserted chateau near the German lines to gather information on the enemy's movements. Losses from an earlier patrol has reduced the squad to just six men: Sgt. Knott, Miller, Avakian, Shutzer, Wilkins, and Mundy. On their way to the chateau, the men discover the frozen corpses of a German and an American in a standing embrace, seemingly arranged by the Germans as a grim joke.

Settling into their temporary home, they soon discover they are not alone. A group of German soldiers has occupied a position nearby. While out on patrol, Knott, Miller and Shutzer see a trio of German soldiers aiming their weapons at them, but the Germans then vanish without shooting. The Germans, clearly more skilled and experienced than the young GIs, soon leave calling cards, start a snowball fight one evening and offer a Christmas truce. At first, the Americans think the Germans are taunting them, but it eventually becomes clear that the Germans wish to talk to them.

Shutzer's Yiddish is enough to communicate with them, and they are revealed to be a small group of teenage soldiers led by an aging officer. Having survived the Eastern Front and sensing that the end of the war is imminent, the Germans say that they wish to surrender. However, they ask that the Americans pretend that the Germans were captured in combat in order to protect their families from possible retribution for their desertion. The Americans agree, but keep the plan from Wilkins, who has been mentally unstable since learning of the death of his child back home.

The two groups meet and proceed to fire their weapons into the air as planned. However, Wilkins hears the shooting and thinks that the engagement is real. Arriving at the scene, Wilkins opens fire at the Germans who, thinking they have been tricked, immediately shoot back. The situation immediately goes out of control and Knott's squad shoots all the Germans, but Mundy is fatally wounded and Shutzer is shot but survives. Mundy's final words are to beg the others not to tell Wilkins that the skirmish was intended to be fake.

The squad's superior officer arrives, reprimanding them for their conduct, before taking Shutzer back for treatment. They later receive word that he died in the hospital. Left alone again, the four remaining soldiers quietly reflect as they try to celebrate Christmas and clean Mundy's body in a bathtub. Knott makes a $100 bet with the despondent Wilkins that he will survive the war.

The squad is soon forced to flee as the Germans attack the area in strength. Carrying Mundy's corpse, the men disguise themselves as medics and escape back to American lines. When there, Knott is informed that Wilkins has been recommended for the Bronze Star and transferred to the motor pool, while the rest of the squad will be sent into the front lines to fight as regular infantry.

An epilogue screen tells that after the war, Avakian had married, Miller disappeared and Wilkins sent Knott $10 with a blank Christmas card each year for ten years to pay Knott for having lost their bet.

== Cast ==
- Peter Berg as Bud Miller
- Kevin Dillon as Mel Avakian
- Arye Gross as Stan Shutzer
- Ethan Hawke as Will "Won't" Knott
- Gary Sinise as Vance "Mother" Wilkins
- Frank Whaley as Paul "Father" Mundy
- John C. McGinley as Maj. Griffin
- David Jensen as Sgt. Hunt
- Larry Joshua as Lt. Ware
- Curt Lowens as older German NCO
- Rachel Griffin as Janice
- Timothy Shoemaker as Eddie

== Production ==
Parts of the film were shot in Park City, Utah.

== Critical reception ==
The film received mostly positive reviews, with an 88% favorable rating on the review aggregator website Rotten Tomatoes based on 40 reviews. The website's consensus reads, "Beautifully filmed and wonderfully acted, A Midnight Clear is a holiday war film in search of a wider audience." Hal Hinson, a reviewer from the Washington Post lauded it as "a war film completely unlike any other, a compelling accomplishment that's more soul than blood and bullets."

Vincent Canby of the New York Times praised the film's solid construction, concluding that "In A Midnight Clear, just about everything works." Writing in the Los Angeles Times, reviewer Michael Wilmington characterized the film as "...not quite a great war movie but certainly a sensitive, bright and supremely moral one" and added that "At its best, it's a barely muted cry against war's stupidity and injustice. With a clear eye, the movie shows us midnight."

Reviewing the film's 2012 DVD release in the Observer, Philip French described the film as "an ironic, at times surreal fable.....and the plot's twists are matched by the sharpness of its moral insights."

== Awards ==
The film was nominated for a 1993 Independent Spirit Award – Best Screenplay for Keith Gordon.
