= Birdy (film) =

1984 American drama film

- Theatrical release poster
- Directed by: Alan Parker
- Screenplay by: Sandy Kroopf; Jack Behr
- Based on: Birdy by William Wharton
- Produced by: Alan Marshall
- Starring: Matthew Modine; Nicolas Cage
- Cinematography: Michael Seresin
- Edited by: Gerry Hambling
- Music by: Peter Gabriel
- Production companies: A&M Films; Delphi III Productions
- Distributed by: Tri-Star Pictures
- Release date: December 21, 1984 (United States)
- Running time: 120 minutes
- Country: United States
- Language: English
- Budget: $12 million
- Box office: $1.4 million

Birdy is a 1984 American drama film based on William Wharton's 1978 novel. Directed by Alan Parker, it stars Matthew Modine and Nicolas Cage. Set in 1960s Philadelphia, Pennsylvania, the film focuses on the friendship between two teenage boys, Birdy (Modine) and Al Columbato (Cage). The story is presented in flashbacks, with a frame narrative depicting their traumatic experiences serving in the Vietnam War.

Parker initially turned down an opportunity to direct, believing that the complex book could not be successfully adapted for a feature film. The project resurfaced in 1982 when A&M Films, a subsidiary of A&M Records, acquired the film rights and commissioned Sandy Kroopf and Jack Behr to write the screenplay. Upon reading the script, Parker returned as director, and the film continued development at Tri-Star Pictures. Principal photography began in May 1984 and concluded in August of that year. Filming took place on locations in Philadelphia and Santa Clara, California. The film is notable for being the first to be partially shot with the Skycam, a computer-controlled camera system created by Steadicam inventor Garrett Brown. The score was composed by Peter Gabriel.

Birdy opened in limited release on December 12, 1984. It underperformed at the North American box office, grossing only $1.4 million against a budget of $12 million. The film received mostly positive reviews, and has an approval rating of 83% at Rotten Tomatoes. Birdy was chosen by the National Board of Review as one of the Top Ten Films of 1984, and won the Grand Prix Spécial du Jury prize at the 1985 Cannes Film Festival.

== Plot ==
In a 1960s working-class neighborhood in Philadelphia, Pennsylvania, a teenage boy nicknamed "Birdy" befriends his next-door neighbor Al Columbato, who relates to Birdy’s fascination with birds and their ability to fly. The two begin pursuing Birdy's hobby of catching pigeons and caging them in a large, wooden aviary that he has built outside his parents' home.

One night, the teenagers climb on top of a refinery building, where Birdy hangs on the ledge to catch the pigeons roosting on it. Birdy loses his grip and falls several stories, but he lands on a pile of sand. Slightly dazed, he tells Al that during the fall, he flew. After Birdy is hospitalized for minor injuries, his parents dismantle the aviary.

Birdy concedes to Al's wishes of pursuing another venture. After they purchase and restore a 1953 Ford automobile, Al's father registers the vehicle. Al drives Birdy to an Atlantic City boardwalk, but they are arrested the next day after Mr. Columbato reports the car stolen. After bailing the boys out of jail, Mr. Columbato sells the vehicle. Birdy later confronts him, claiming that the car was not his to sell. Mr. Columbato offers Birdy a sum of money, which Birdy refuses on principle.

Birdy builds a new aviary in his bedroom and purchases two canaries. He names the female Perta and the male Alfonso (after his friend). Upon returning to school, Birdy encounters a classmate, Doris Robinson, and Al encourages him to ask her out on a date. At the prom, Birdy dances unenthusiastically with Doris, leaving her confused and humiliated. Afterwards, Doris drives him to a secluded spot, where Birdy lightly rejects her sexual advances. Birdy returns home to his bedroom and lies down naked in the aviary. In a semi-conscious state, he expresses that he wants to die and be born again as a bird. He then imagines himself flying like a bird around his room, throughout the house and outside in the neighborhood.

Upon graduation, Al enlists and Birdy is drafted into the United States Army. During the Vietnam War, Birdy is placed in a mental hospital after being missing in action for a month. A flashback reveals that he was the sole survivor of a helicopter crash. Al is hospitalized in the same facility. His face is heavily bandaged for injuries that he sustained from an exploding bomb. Major Weiss, a military doctor, informs Al that, although Birdy's injuries are relatively minor, Birdy has not spoken since he was found. Al speaks to Birdy at length, but Al grows increasingly frustrated by his lack of response. He is then elated when Birdy smiles at a joke he makes. Weiss dismisses the response as dissociative behavior.

Al suspects Birdy of feigning insanity to hide from the world, and he expresses to Birdy that he too wishes to hide due to his own injuries. Birdy unexpectedly responds by telling Al that he is "full of shit". Al alerts Weiss to Birdy's response, but when the doctor arrives, Birdy remains silent. Not seeing any progress, Weiss orders Al to leave, but Al pushes the doctor aside. After Weiss flees, two orderlies are sent in to subdue Al, who fights them and takes Birdy to the roof of the hospital. Birdy rushes to the ledge, raises his arms and jumps off the side of the roof as if he were about to fly. Thinking Birdy has plunged to severe injury, Al runs over to the ledge but finds Birdy on another level of the roof, perfectly fine. Birdy looks up at Al and says, "What?"

== Cast ==
- Matthew Modine as "Birdy"
- Nicolas Cage as Alfonso "Al" Columbato
- John Harkins as Dr. / Major Weiss
- Sandy Baron as Mr. Columbato
- Karen Young as Hannah Rourke
- Bruno Kirby as Phil Renaldi
- Nancy Fish as Mrs. Prevost
- George Buck as Birdy's Father
- Dolores Sage as Birdy's Mother
- R. L. Ryan as Joe Sagessa
- James Santini as Mario Columbato
- Maud Winchester as Doris Robinson
- Marshall Bell as Ronsky
- Elizabeth Whitcraft as Rosanne
- Sandra Beall as Shirley
- Victoria Nekko as Claire
- Crystal Field as Mrs. Columbato
- John Brumfeld as Mr. Kohler

== Production ==
"Our film I hope will be about friendship, obsession, and ... the nearer verges of insanity. It's also about the way in which all of us, trapped within the walls and predicaments that skirt our lives, endeavour to soar above them ... William Wharton wrote a remarkable, original book and we now have, I believe, a very special script."

— An excerpt from director Alan Parker's pre-production letter to the crew.

=== Development ===
Following publication of William Wharton's 1978 novel Birdy, Alan Parker received galley proofs of the book from his agent, who advised him that the novel was going to be optioned. Upon reading the novel, Parker discussed it with his colleague, producer Alan Marshall, before turning down the opportunity to direct a film adaptation. He explained, "So much of the story happened inside the boy's head, and the poetry of the book was literary. To make it cinematic - I didn't know if I could make the jump." In September 1979, Orion Pictures optioned the novel for $150,000.

In October 1982, A&M Films, a newly established subsidiary of A&M Records, acquired the film rights and commissioned Sandy Kroopf and Jack Behr to write the screenplay. Kroopf and Behr made various changes from the novel, opting to focus primarily on the friendship between Birdy and Al Columbato. They also decided to set the story during the Vietnam War, as opposed to the novel, which is set during World War II. "We were in high school in the mid-1960s," Behr explained, "so growing up then was our experience." Structuring the film required Kroopf and Behr to create a nonlinear narrative, and manufacture much of its action and dialogue from Al's narrative in the novel. They spent one year trying to sell their script to various studios, without success. In 1983, Parker received the script from A&M and, after reading it, signed on as director. He then discussed the adaptation with executives at Tri-Star Pictures. After the studio agreed to produce the film, Parker traveled to Los Angeles, where he met with Kroopf and Behr to work on the script.

=== Casting ===
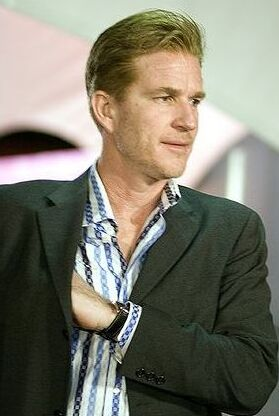
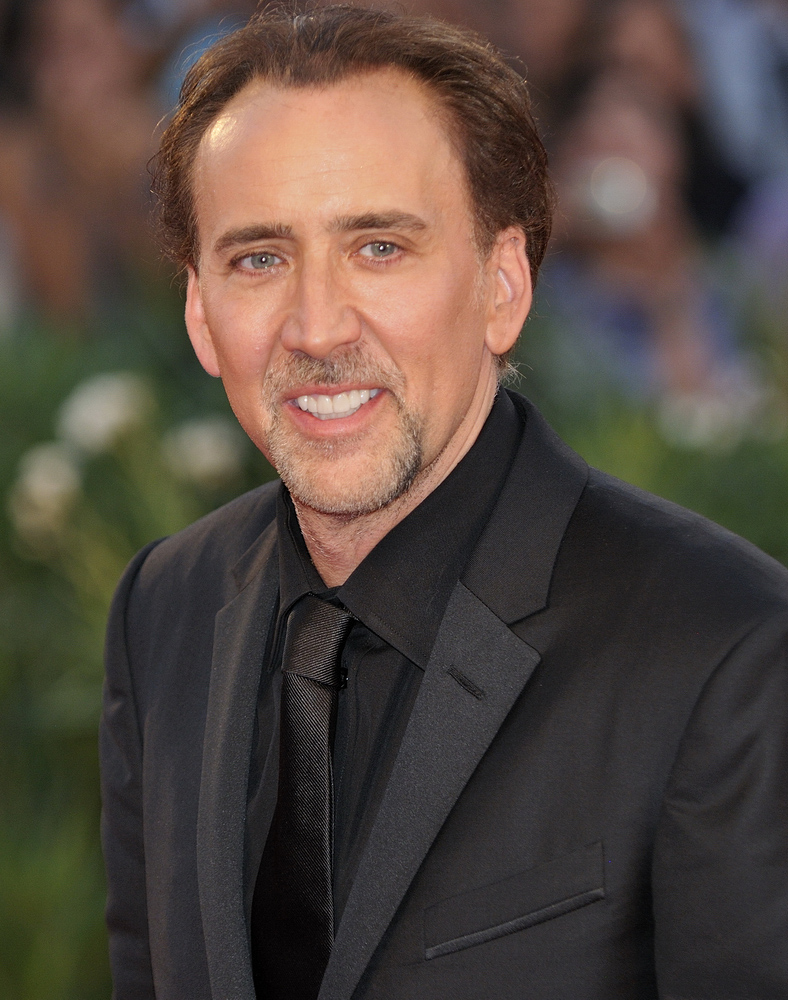
Left to right: Matthew Modine and Nicolas Cage, who star in the film as Birdy and Al, respectively.

Parker and casting director Juliet Taylor held open casting calls in Los Angeles, San Francisco, San Jose, New York City and Philadelphia. Matthew Modine originally auditioned for the role of Al Columbato, but Parker decided to cast him as Birdy, believing that the actor possessed an "introverted honest quality" that best suited the character. Modine said, "I was flabbergasted because I hadn't auditioned for Birdy. I had never imagined playing the part of Birdy. So, I had to really go through an extraordinary transformation in my mind of trying to bring this remarkable character to life. It was an incredible experience making the film."

Nicolas Cage was cast as Al Columbato. He reflected, "I was terrified of the role of Al, because it was like nothing I'd ever done before, and I didn't know how to get to the places the role was asking me to go emotionally." For scenes in which Al's face is disfigured and swathed in bandages, Cage lost 15 pounds and had two upper teeth pulled, one on each side. "I wanted to look like I was hit by a bomb," he said. "It gave me a feeling of something I had lost. I felt this was a once-in-a-lifetime part, and it deserved that much."

Elizabeth Whitcraft had been working as a waitress in Philadelphia before she was cast as Rosanne, a teenage girl who makes out with Al. The film marked her feature film debut. Maude Winchester secured the role of Doris Robinson, a teenage girl who Birdy encounters, during auditions in San Francisco. Dolores Sage, also making her film debut, plays Birdy's mother. Danny Glover secured the role of Mr. Lincoln, a bird owner who befriends Birdy, but Parker had his scene removed from the final film, explaining that it "was rather misplaced within the framework of [the] story".

=== Filming ===
==== Pre-production ====
Parker originally planned to shoot scenes in Oakland, California, before visiting the actual Philadelphia locations described in the novel. Upon arriving in Philadelphia, he and producer Alan Marshall set up production offices at a Holiday Inn hotel. Location scouting began as Parker was holding casting calls in New York City. Location manager Rory Enke and production designer Geoffrey Kirkland visited run-down areas of Philadelphia, and offered suggestions to Parker on his weekend visits from New York. Parker made an arrangement with the International Alliance of Theatrical Stage Employees (IATSE) that permitted the British crew members to work alongside members of both the east and west coast union locals. He had to employ no less than four members of the two camera locals in order to allow his past collaborators—director of photography Michael Seresin, camera operator Michael Roberts and editor Gerry Hambling—to work on the film.

==== Principal photography ====
Filming was scheduled to start in December 1983, but was postponed for six months to accommodate Modine's shooting schedule for Mrs. Soffel (1984). Principal photography began in Philadelphia on May 15, 1984, with a budget of $12 million. The script required that a total of 24 locations be used for filming in Philadelphia and Santa Clara, California. Animal trainer Gary Gero employed the use of 80 different canaries for various scenes in the film, as well as pigeons, a hornbill, a cat, eighteen dogs and a seagull.

A women's prison wing located in the Philadelphia House of Correction doubled for a scene set in an Atlantic City jail. A scene depicting Birdy and Al climbing an elevated railway was filmed at the 46th Street Station above the intersection of Farragut and Market Street in the Mill Creek neighborhood. The cast and crew then moved to Philadelphia City Hall, where Wilson Goode, the city's first African American mayor, visited the set and gave the production his blessing.

After four weeks of filming in Philadelphia, the cast and crew moved to Wildwood, New Jersey, which doubled for scenes set at the Atlantic City boardwalk. Filming then moved to San Francisco, California. The scene where Birdy and Al climb atop a refinery building was filmed on the rooftop of an abandoned gasworks in Hercules, California. The scene required Modine and Cage to hang off the edge of the roof secured by safety wires, while the sequence in which Birdy falls off the roof was performed by a stunt double.

The production next filmed Birdy's flight on an ornithopter at the Newby Island landfill in Santa Clara County. The filming of the scene was considered to be a health concern among the cast and crew, due to the exposed garbage and smell of methane gas. The filmmakers originally planned to shoot Birdy landing in a reservoir thirty feet away from the landfill, but a test of the water had shown it to be hazardous. Parker said, "We experimented with a 100-foot wire hanging from a helicopter to allow us to 'fly' Birdy into a pond we'd constructed at the bottom of a hill of garbage." The military hospital scenes were filmed at the Agnews Developmental Center, a psychiatric and medical care facility located in Santa Clara. A corner of the hospital was used to film scenes set in Birdy's bedroom.

The production then moved to Stockton, California to depict a scene involving Al aboard a train. The Vietnam War sequences were filmed in Modesto, California, where the art department found difficulty in pinpointing filming locations, as the entire area was flooded. The use of helicopters during filming was the subject of frequent discussions with the Federal Aviation Administration (FAA), following an accident during the production of Twilight Zone: The Movie (1983). The special effects department used fifteen 20-gallon drums of gasoline rigged with explosive charges to depict a napalm strike. A total of four cameras were used to film the explosions. Principal photography concluded in early August 1984.

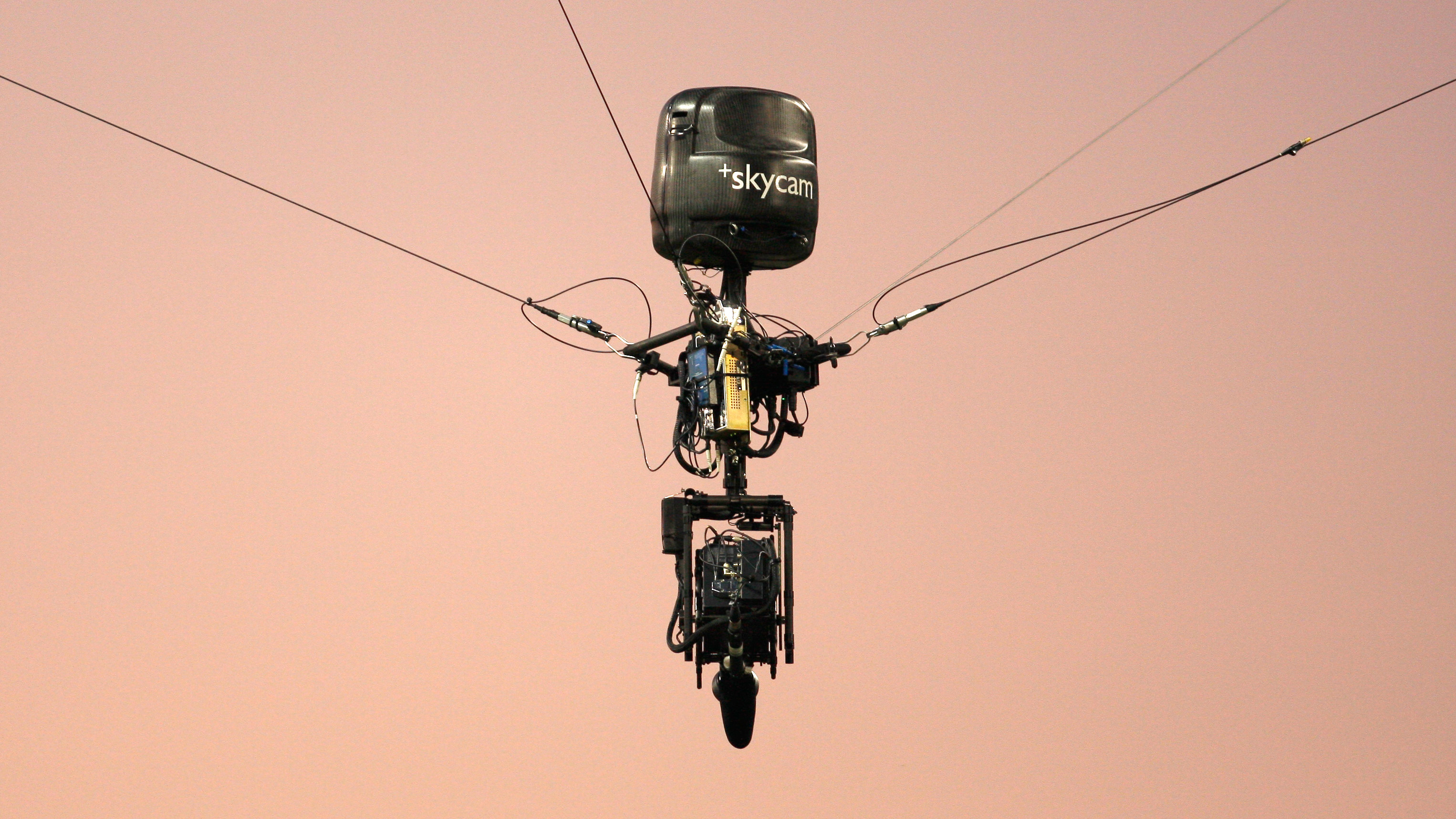
The film was the first to be partially shot with the Skycam, a computer-controlled, cable-suspended camera system created by Garrett Brown.

==== Cinematography ====
The film was the first to be partially shot with the Skycam, a computer-controlled, cable-suspended camera system created by Garrett Brown, inventor of the Steadicam. The Skycam had 100-foot high posts with four hanging wires controlled by a computer, and a lightweight Panavision camera with 200 feet of film hung at the center of the wires. The filmmakers intended to use the Skycam to fully depict Birdy's point of view during a fantasy sequence in which he imagines himself as a bird flying, but they encountered difficulties, as the camera would often malfunction. Although the Skycam proved successful on its first take, Parker insisted that the filmed footage be shot more rapidly, but the camera system malfunctioned during its second take, after capturing 40 seconds of footage. This resulted in the camera operators shooting the remainder of the sequence with a Steadicam mounted on top of an improvised camera dolly.

=== Music ===
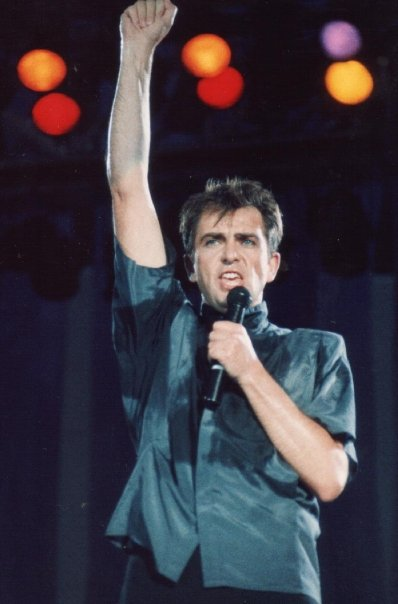
Peter Gabriel, who scored the film.

The score was written, co-produced and composed by English singer and songwriter Peter Gabriel, and marked his first work on a feature film. During post-production, Parker had been incorporating the percussive rhythms from Gabriel's solo albums into the film. He contacted the musician's manager David Geffen, who advised him that producing the soundtrack would be a slow process, as Gabriel was known for working at his own pace. While working on his fifth studio album So, Gabriel agreed to score Birdy after viewing a rough cut of the film.

Recording sessions took place at the Ashcombe House in Somerset, England, from October to December 1984. Gabriel used tapes of previously recorded material from the past four years, which he and music producer Daniel Lanois remixed for select scenes in the film. The score "Close Up" originated from the song "Family Snapshot" (from Gabriel's third album), which was composed on a Yamaha CP-70 Electric Grand Piano. The track "Birdy's Flight" is based upon the instrumental outro of "Not One of Us," also from Gabriel's third album. "The Heat", "Under Lock and Key" and "Powerhouse at the Foot of the Mountain" borrowed musical elements from "The Rhythm of the Heat," "Wallflower," and "San Jacinto," all songs on Gabriel's fourth album, which had been composed on a Fairlight CMI IIx, a music workstation with an embedded digital sampling synthesizer.

The soundtrack album, entitled Birdy: Music from the Film, was released on March 18, 1985, by Geffen Records and Charisma Records. AllMusic's Tom Demalon awarded it four stars out of five, writing, "The fact that Birdy is comprised of all instrumentals means that listeners whose familiarity with Gabriel is limited to 'Sledgehammer' and 'In Your Eyes' will be largely disappointed. However, its meditative nature makes it fine, reflective listening for the more adventurous."

In an interview with Spin in 1986, Gabriel said, “Birdy was about the struggle of the spirit... It was about the interplay between the traumatized Birdy, the wounded victim, and his best friend, who’s ostensibly the tough one. But in the end, it’s Birdy who’s strong and his friend who’s cracking. When I saw the rough cut of the film, I knew I had to do it. It haunted me.”

Recalling in 2010 his experience of working with Gabriel, Alan Parker told Prog magazine, "We got on so well, he’s such a sweet man. It was such a refreshing change from working with megalomaniacs like Roger Waters. Peter’s record company were very difficult to begin with, and so I phoned them to ask if they’d mind if Peter took a little time to do this, and they said as long as it didn’t take more than a couple of months because Peter was already a year late or something. He had strong views and I would never be able to persuade him to do something he didn’t feel comfortable with, but we didn’t have any confrontation as such."

== Release ==
Tri-Star Pictures had planned to release the film using a platform technique which involved opening it in select cities before releasing it nationwide. The studio was confident that the limited theatrical run would generate strong-word-of-mouth interest and awards consideration for the film. Birdy opened in limited release on December 21, 1984, in New York City, Los Angeles and Toronto. The film's failure to garner any award nominations during the limited run resulted in Tri-Star cancelling a wide release scheduled for late January 1985. In response, A&M Films prompted the studio to refocus the film's marketing campaign. Tri-Star adjusted its promotional focus on the friendship between Birdy and Al, while Parker, Modine and Cage heavily promoted the film by personally visiting critics, journalists and radio reporters. Birdy underperformed at the North American box office, grossing only $1,455,045 in the United States and Canada, against a budget of $12 million.

=== Home media ===
The film was released on VHS in mid-June 1985 by RCA/Columbia Pictures Home Video, and on DVD on February 15, 2000, by Columbia TriStar Home Video. The DVD presents the film in optional fullscreen and anamorphic widescreen versions on both sides of the disc. Special features include the film's theatrical trailer, as well as trailers for other films starring Cage and directed by Parker, information on the cast and crew, and a booklet featuring production notes.

Birdy was first released on the Blu-ray format in the United States on June 25, 2019. It was given a manufacture on demand release, with no extras other than the theatrical trailer. A region-free, limited-edition version was released in the United Kingdom by Powerhouse Films on October 28, 2019. Parker oversaw the film's 2K digital restoration. Special features include a 48-page booklet, the theatrical trailer, interviews with the cast and crew, an audio commentary by Parker and Justin Johnson of the British Film Institute, and Parker's 1976 television film No Hard Feelings.

== Reception ==
=== Critical response ===
Birdy received mostly positive reviews from mainstream film critics. The review aggregation website Rotten Tomatoes sampled 44 reviews, and gave the film a score of 84%, with an average score of 7.3 out of 10. The consensus summarizes: "Aided by strong work from Matthew Modine and Nicolas Cage, Birdy finds director Alan Parker turning a supposedly unfilmable novel into a soaring -- and emotionally searing -- success." Roger Ebert, in his review for the Chicago Sun-Times, awarded the film four stars out of four, writing, "Birdy ... tells a story so unlikely ... and yet a story so interesting it is impossible to put this movie out of my mind." Janet Maslin of The New York Times wrote, "Mr. Parker has for the most part directed the film deftly and unobtrusively. Every so often, though, he introduces the kind of overstatement Birdy didn't need ... Fortunately, the heavy-handedness is in limited supply. Most of Birdy is enchanting." Film critic Emanuel Levy called it "a powerfully dramatic chronicle of postwar trauma."

Gene Siskel of the Chicago Tribune, felt that the film was "far better as an antiwar film than as a poetic tribute to flight". Pauline Kael of The New Yorker praised Modine and Cage's performance, but described that the film as being "morose and unrelieved". Variety wrote, "Belying the lightheartedness of its title, Birdy is a heavy adult drama about best friends and the after-effects of war, but it takes too long to live up to its ambitious premise." Jack Zink of the Sun-Sentinel wrote that the film "takes a while to hook you into its story. This is one occasion we can afford the wait; Parker keeps us awake by repeatedly slapping us across the face visually."

=== Accolades ===
Birdy received several awards and honors, with particular recognition for the film itself. The National Board of Review named it one of the Top Ten Films of 1984. Following its release, the film premiered at the 1985 Cannes Film Festival, and on May 20, 1985, it won the Grand Prix Spécial du Jury prize. In 1987, the film received an Audience Award at the Warsaw International Film Festival.
