= Birdy (novel) =

1978 novel by William Wharton

- Front cover of first edition
- Author: William Wharton
- Cover artist: Fred Marcellino
- Language: English
- Publisher: Knopf
- Publication date: December 1978
- Publication place: United Kingdom
- Media type: Print & Audio
- Pages: 309
- ISBN: 978-0-394-42569-6

Birdy is the debut novel of William Wharton, who was more than 50 years old when it was published. It won the U.S. National Book Award in category First Novel. Birdy was a Pulitzer Prize finalist in 1980, ultimately losing to The Executioner's Song by Norman Mailer.

Birdy is about the lifelong friendship between two boys in Philadelphia, the shy and bird-obsessed Birdy and his tough, conventional friend Al, and how their dreams are shattered by the horrors of World War II. The story is told from both of their perspectives as Al visits Birdy in an army mental hospital after the war, and Birdy recounts his lifelong obsession with flight, which becomes his reality as a way to cope with the trauma.

Birdy was adapted as a film of the same name, directed by Alan Parker and starring Matthew Modine and Nicolas Cage. The film, released in 1984, updated the story's setting to the Vietnam War era.

The novel has said to have been a lyrical influence on the song "The King of Birds" by American alternative rock band R.E.M.

Naomi Wallace, a poet and playwright, adapted Birdy for the stage in 1997.
