= Lisa Bonet =

American actress (born 1967)

- Born: Lisa Michelle Bonet; November 16, 1967 (age 59); San Francisco, California, U.S.
- Other name: Lilakoi Moon
- Occupation: Actress
- Years active: 1983–present
- Known for: Denise Huxtable in The Cosby Show
- Spouses: Lenny Kravitz (m. 1987; div. 1993) Jason Momoa (m. 2017; div. 2024)
- Children: 3, including Zoë
- Relatives: Kadhja Bonet (half-sister)

Lilakoi Moon (born Lisa Michelle Bonet /boʊˈneɪ/ boh-NAY; November 16, 1967) is an American actress. She is best known for portraying Denise Huxtable on the sitcom The Cosby Show (1984–1992), for which she earned widespread acclaim and a nomination for the Primetime Emmy Award for Outstanding Supporting Actress in a Comedy Series in 1986; she reprised the role of Denise in the first season of the spinoff series A Different World.

She also appeared in the psychological horror film Angel Heart (1987), which earned her a nomination for the Saturn Award for Best Supporting Actress. Bonet has starred in the thriller film Enemy of the State (1998) and the comedy-drama film High Fidelity (2000). She has sporadically worked in television acting, appearing in roles such as Maya Daniels in Life on Mars (2008–2009) and Marisol on Ray Donovan (2016).

== Early life ==
Lisa Michelle Bonet was born on November 16, 1967, in San Francisco, California, to Arlene Joyce Litman, an Ashkenazi Jewish-American schoolteacher, and Allen Bonet, an opera singer of African-American heritage from Texas. She has five half-sisters, including singer Kadhja Bonet, and two half-brothers by her father's marriage to Deborah Church. Bonet's parents separated when Bonet was still a baby. Bonet was raised by her single mother in middle-class Reseda and never knew her father. Bonet said she never fit in at Birmingham High School, in Van Nuys, California. "I was stuck in the middle," she told The Los Angeles Times. "The black kids called me an Oreo. The white kids didn't talk to me."

She said she did not date in high school because she didn't fit in. "My biggest worry in high school was who was going to take me to the prom, since I didn't have a date," she told the Los Angeles Times. She said the problem disappeared when she landed the Cosby job in New York and wouldn't attend prom.

Bonet graduated from Birmingham High School and later studied acting at the Celluloid Actor's Studio in North Hollywood.

== Career ==
After being in beauty competitions and appearing in guest spots on television series as a child, Bonet landed the role of Denise Huxtable on The Cosby Show, the second-oldest child of Cliff and Clair Huxtable (played by Bill Cosby and Phylicia Rashad, respectively). Later in the show, she becomes the stepmother to Olivia Kendall (played by Raven-Symoné). From 1987 to 1988, she portrayed the role of Denise in the first season of the spinoff series A Different World.

In 1987, Bonet played 17-year-old Epiphany Proudfoot in the movie Angel Heart opposite Mickey Rourke. In the film, several seconds of an explicit scene she shared with Rourke (filmed when she was 18) were edited to avoid an X rating. For Angel Heart, Bonet earned a nomination for the Saturn Award for Best Supporting Actress. She was featured topless in Interview magazine.

Bonet didn't appreciate the way the press covered her or the controversy at the time. "I think the whole scandal is ridiculous," she said. "They (the news media) are trying to steam it up." She said that the brief glimpse of one of her bare breasts is "nothing that hasn't been done before or that hasn't been seen before," comparing it to films like Blue Velvet, which was rated R even though it contained frontal nudity.

In 1986, Bonet earned a nomination for the Primetime Emmy Award for Outstanding Supporting Actress in a Comedy Series. After announcing her pregnancy during the run of A Different World, Bonet left the series. She returned to The Cosby Show the following year, but was fired in April 1991 because of "creative differences".

In September 1992, Bonet hosted Why Bother Voting?, an election special focusing on young voters' concerns and apathy. She had supporting roles in the 1998 film Enemy of the State and the 2000 film High Fidelity. In 2003, she played Queenie in Biker Boyz, which reunited her with her A Different World co-star Kadeem Hardison.

Bonet co-starred in the film Whitepaddy in 2005. She did not have another film role until 2014's Road to Paloma, opposite her future husband Jason Momoa. She did, however, appear in a number of television series, including the American adaptation of the British television series Life on Mars. She again played a romantic lead opposite Jason Momoa on the Sundance TV series The Red Road. "I felt protected and I feel safe when I work with him," Bonet said of working with Momoa.

Since then, Bonet has made guest appearances on TV shows including Girls and Ray Donovan.

== Personal life ==
On November 16, 1987, her 20th birthday, Bonet eloped with American rock singer Lenny Kravitz in Las Vegas. Bonet recalled of their relationship:

It was interesting when we were first finding out about each other, that our backgrounds were so similar. When I first told him my mom was Jewish, and he said "So's my dad," I thought that was unusual and enchanting. I felt like, "Okay, here's someone who really knows how it is." And I think I trusted him a little more with my feelings and let him inside a little more than I ordinarily would have.

Bonet gave birth to their daughter, actress Zoë Isabella Kravitz, on December 1, 1988. She and Kravitz divorced in 1993. That same year, she legally changed her name to Lilakoi Moon, although she still uses the name Lisa Bonet professionally.

Since meeting on the set of A Different World in its first season in 1987, Bonet has been close friends with actress Marisa Tomei, who is a godmother to two of Bonet's youngest children and Cree Summer who is godmother to eldest daughter Zoe Kravitz.

In 2005, Bonet began a relationship with actor Jason Momoa. They married in October 2017. Bonet and Momoa have two children: a daughter born in July 2007, and a son born in December 2008. In January 2022, Momoa and Bonet announced their separation. On January 8, 2024, Bonet filed for divorce, citing irreconcilable differences. In her divorce filing, Bonet revealed that she and Momoa had actually separated on October 7, 2020. Court documents which were obtained by People confirmed that the divorce was granted one day later. A Los Angeles county judge declared them divorced on July 9, 2024. Neither Bonet nor Momoa asked for financial support, and they agreed on how to split their assets. The court granted them joint custody of their children.

== Filmography ==
=== Film ===
Lisa Bonet film credits
Years	Title	Role
1987	Angel Heart	Epiphany Proudfoot
1993	Bank Robber	Priscilla
1994	Final Combination	Catherine Briggs
1998	Enemy of the State	Rachel Banks
2000	High Fidelity	Marie De Salle
2003	Biker Boyz	"Queenie"
2005	Whitepaddy	Mae Evans
2014	Road to Paloma	Magdalena

=== Television ===
Lisa Bonet television credits
Year	Title	Role	Notes
1983	St. Elsewhere	Carla	Episode: "Entrapment"
1984–1991	The Cosby Show	Denise Huxtable	Main cast
1985	Tales from the Darkside	Justine	Episode: "The Satanic Piano"
1985	ABC Afterschool Special	Carrie	1 episode
1986	Sesame Street	Herself	Recurring Guest
1987–1989	A Different World	Denise Huxtable	Main cast (Season 1); Guest (Season 3)
1990	The Earth Day Special	Denise Huxtable	
1992	Why Bother Voting?	Herself	Elections special with Bonet as host
1994	New Eden	Lily	Television movie
2002	Lathe of Heaven	Heather Lelache	Television movie
2008–2009	Life on Mars	Maya Daniels	5 episodes
2013–2014	Drunk History	Mary Ellen Pleasant; Rosa Parks	2 episodes
2014–2015	The Red Road	Sky Van Der Veen	7 episodes
2014	New Girl	Brenda Brown	Episode: "Teachers"
2016	Girls	Tandice Moncrief	2 episodes
2016	Ray Donovan	Marisol	Recurring – Season 4

=== Music videos ===
Lisa Bonet music video credits
Year	Song	Artist	Role
1990	"It Never Rains (In Southern California)"	Tony! Toni! Toné!	Director
1991	"Stand by My Woman"	Lenny Kravitz	Director
1999	"Revelation Sunshine"	Cree Summer	Director
2019	"Freedom (TROY NōKA Remix)"	Dorothy, Angel Haze	Director

== Awards and nominations ==
Awards and nominations received by Lisa Bonet
Year	Award	Category	Work	Result
1985	Young Artist Awards	Best Young Supporting Actress in a Television Comedy Series	The Cosby Show	Nominated
1986	Young Artist Awards	Best Young Actress Starring in a Television Series	The Cosby Show	Nominated
1988	Young Artist Awards	Best Young Actress Starring in a Television Series	The Cosby Show	Nominated
1988	Young Artist Awards	Best Young Female Superstar in Motion Picture	Angel Heart	Won
1988	Saturn Awards	Best Supporting Actress	Angel Heart	Nominated
1986	Primetime Emmy Awards	Outstanding Supporting Actress in a Comedy Series	The Cosby Show	Nominated
1989	Young Artist Awards	Best Young Actor/Actress Ensemble in a Television Comedy, Drama Series or Special	The Cosby Show (shared with cast)	Nominated
2001	Black Reel Awards	Theatrical – Best Supporting Actress	High Fidelity	Nominated
2006	TV Land Award	Favorite Singing Siblings	The Cosby Show (shared with cast)	Nominated
