= List of On the Buses episodes =

The following is a list of episodes for On the Buses, a British sitcom that aired on ITV from 28 February 1969 to 20 May 1973. The transmission dates listed are those for the LWT/London region. Some ITV regions transmitted episodes on different days.

== Series overview ==
Series	Episodes	Originally released	
Series	Episodes	First released	Last released
1	7	28 February 1969	11 April 1969
2	6	31 May 1969	5 July 1969
3	13	2 January 1970	27 March 1970
4	13	27 November 1970	21 February 1971
5	15	19 September 1971	26 December 1971
6	7	20 February 1972	2 April 1972
7	13	26 February 1973	20 May 1973

== Episodes ==
=== Series 1 (1969) ===
No. overall	No. in series	Title	Directed by	Written by	Original release date
1	1	"The Early Shift"	Stuart Allen	Ronald Chesney & Ronald Wolfe	28 February 1969
2	2	"The New Conductor"	Stuart Allen	Ronald Chesney & Ronald Wolfe	7 March 1969
3	3	"Olive Takes a Trip"	Stuart Allen	Ronald Chesney & Ronald Wolfe	14 March 1969
4	4	"Bus Drivers' Stomach"	Stuart Allen	Ronald Chesney & Ronald Wolfe	21 March 1969
5	5	"The New Inspector"	Stuart Allen	Ronald Chesney & Ronald Wolfe	28 March 1969
6	6	"The Canteen"	Stuart Allen	Ronald Chesney & Ronald Wolfe	4 April 1969
7	7	"The Darts Match"	Stuart Allen	Ronald Chesney & Ronald Wolfe	11 April 1969

=== Series 2 (1969) ===
No. overall	No. in series	Title	Directed by	Written by	Original release date
8	1	"Family Flu"	Stuart Allen	Ronald Chesney & Ronald Wolfe	31 May 1969
9	2	"The Used Combination"	Stuart Allen	Ronald Chesney & Ronald Wolfe	7 June 1969
10	3	"Self Defence"	Stuart Allen	Ronald Chesney & Ronald Wolfe	14 June 1969
11	4	"Aunt Maud"	Stuart Allen	Ronald Chesney & Ronald Wolfe	21 June 1969
12	5	"Late Again"	Stuart Allen	Ronald Chesney & Ronald Wolfe	28 June 1969
13	6	"Bon Voyage"	Stuart Allen	Ronald Chesney & Ronald Wolfe	5 July 1969

=== Series 3 (1970) ===
No. overall	No. in series	Title	Directed by	Written by	Original release date
14	1	"First Aid"	Stuart Allen	Ronald Chesney & Ronald Wolfe	2 January 1970
15	2	"The Cistern"	Stuart Allen	Ronald Chesney & Ronald Wolfe	9 January 1970
16	3	"The Inspector's Niece"	Stuart Allen	Ronald Chesney & Ronald Wolfe	16 January 1970
17	4	"Brew it Yourself"	Stuart Allen	Ronald Chesney & Ronald Wolfe	23 January 1970
18	5	"Busmen's Perks"	Stuart Allen	Ronald Chesney & Ronald Wolfe	30 January 1970
19	6	"The Snake"	Stuart Allen	Ronald Chesney & Ronald Wolfe	6 February 1970
20	7	"Mum's Last Fling"	Stuart Allen	Ronald Chesney & Ronald Wolfe	13 February 1970
21	8	"Radio Control"	Stuart Allen	Ronald Chesney & Ronald Wolfe	20 February 1970
22	9	"Foggy Night"	Stuart Allen	Ronald Chesney & Ronald Wolfe	27 February 1970
23	10	"The New Uniforms"	Stuart Allen	Ronald Chesney & Ronald Wolfe	6 March 1970
24	11	"Going Steady"	Howard Ross	Ronald Chesney & Ronald Wolfe	13 March 1970
25	12	"The Squeeze"	Howard Ross	Ronald Chesney & Ronald Wolfe	20 March 1970
26	13	"On the Make"	Howard Ross	Ronald Chesney & Ronald Wolfe	27 March 1970

=== Series 4 (1970–71) ===
No. overall	No. in series	Title	Written by	Original release date
27	1	"Nowhere to Go"	Ronald Chesney & Ronald Wolfe	27 November 1970
28	2	"The Canteen Girl"	Ronald Chesney & Ronald Wolfe	4 December 1970
29	3	"Dangerous Driving"	Ronald Chesney & Ronald Wolfe	11 December 1970
30	4	"The Other Woman"	Ronald Chesney & Ronald Wolfe	18 December 1970
31	5	"Christmas Duty"	Ronald Chesney & Ronald Wolfe	25 December 1970
32	6	"The 'L' Bus"	Ronald Chesney & Ronald Wolfe	1 January 1971
33	7	"The Kids' Outing"	Ronald Chesney & Ronald Wolfe	10 January 1971
34	8	"The Anniversary"	Ronald Chesney & Ronald Wolfe	17 January 1971
35	9	"Cover Up"	Ronald Chesney & Ronald Wolfe	24 January 1971
36	10	"Safety First"	Ronald Chesney & Ronald Wolfe	31 January 1971
37	11	"The Lodger"	Ronald Chesney & Ronald Wolfe	7 February 1971
38	12	"The Injury"	Ronald Chesney & Ronald Wolfe	14 February 1971
39	13	"Not Tonight"	Ronald Chesney & Ronald Wolfe	21 February 1971

=== Series 5 (1971) ===
No. overall	No. in series	Title	Written by	Original release date
40	1	"The Nursery"	Ronald Chesney & Ronald Wolfe	19 September 1971
41	2	"Stan's Room"	Ronald Chesney & Ronald Wolfe	26 September 1971
42	3	"The Best Man"	Ronald Chesney & Ronald Wolfe	3 October 1971
43	4	"The Inspector's Pets"	Ronald Chesney & Ronald Wolfe	10 October 1971
44	5	"The Epidemic"	Ronald Chesney & Ronald Wolfe	17 October 1971
45	6	"The Busmen's Ball"	Ronald Chesney & Ronald Wolfe	24 October 1971
46	7	"Canteen Trouble"	Ronald Chesney & Ronald Wolfe	31 October 1971
47	8	"The New Nurse"	Ronald Chesney & Ronald Wolfe	7 November 1971
48	9	"Lost Property"	Ronald Chesney & Ronald Wolfe	14 November 1971
49	10	"Stan's Uniform"	Ronald Chesney & Ronald Wolfe	21 November 1971
50	11	"The Strain"	Ronald Chesney & Ronald Wolfe	28 November 1971
51	12	"The New Telly"	Ronald Chesney & Ronald Wolfe	5 December 1971
52	13	"Vacancy for Inspector"	Bob Grant and Stephen Lewis	12 December 1971
53	14	"A Thin Time"	Bob Grant and Stephen Lewis	19 December 1971
54	15	"Boxing Day Social"	Ronald Chesney & Ronald Wolfe	26 December 1971

=== Series 6 (1972) ===
No. overall	No. in series	Title	Written by	Original release date
55	1	"No Smoke Without Fire"	Bob Grant & Stephen Lewis	20 February 1972
56	2	"Love Is What You Make It"	George Layton and Jonathan Lynn	27 February 1972
57	3	"Private Hire"	Bob Grant & Stephen Lewis	5 March 1972
58	4	"Stan's Worst Day"	Bob Grant & Stephen Lewis	12 March 1972
59	5	"Union Trouble"	Bob Grant & Stephen Lewis	19 March 1972
60	6	"Bye Bye Blakey"	George Layton & Jonathan Lynn	26 March 1972
61	7	"The Prize"	George Layton & Jonathan Lynn	2 April 1972

=== Series 7 (1973) ===
No. overall	No. in series	Title	Written by	Original release date
62	1	"Olive's Divorce"	Ronald Chesney & Ronald Wolfe	26 February 1973
63	2	"The Perfect Clippie"	George Layton & Jonathan Lynn	4 March 1973
64	3	"The Ticket Machine"	Bob Grant & Stephen Lewis	11 March 1973
65	4	"The Poster"	Wally Malston & Garry Chambers	18 March 1973
66	5	"The Football Match"	Bob Grant & Stephen Lewis	25 March 1973
67	6	"On the Omnibuses"	Bob Grant & Stephen Lewis	1 April 1973
68	7	"Goodbye Stan"	Ronald Chesney & Ronald Wolfe	8 April 1973
69	8	"Hot Water"	Bob Grant & Stephen Lewis	15 April 1973
70	9	"The Visit"	George Layton & Jonathan Lynn	22 April 1973
71	10	"What the Stars Foretell"	Bob Grant & Stephen Lewis	29 April 1973
72	11	"The Allowance"	Myles Rudge	6 May 1973
73	12	"Friends in High Places"	George Layton & Jonathan Lynn	13 May 1973
74	13	"Gardening Time"	Bob Grant & Stephen Lewis	20 May 1973
