= On the Buses series 1 =

On the Buses
- Series 1
- DVD cover
- No. of episodes: 7

Release
- Original network: ITV
- Original release: 28 February – 11 April 1969

Series chronology
- Next → Series 2

The first series of On the Buses originally aired between 28 February 1969 and 11 April 1969, beginning with "The Early Shift". The series was produced and directed by Stuart Allen. The designer for the first three episodes was David Catley, and Andrew Gardner for the rest of the episodes. All the episodes in this series were written by Ronald Chesney and Ronald Wolfe.

== Development ==
=== Origin of On the Buses ===
Chesney and Wolfe were looking for a new idea for a sitcom in the late 1960s. They knew that Reg Varney would be the leading actor because of his previous work on The Rag Trade for the BBC with them. Chesney and Wolfe wanted a combination of The Rag Trade and Meet the Wife, with life at work and at home. They decided that a bus depot setting was the best idea, together with a home setting.

=== Production ===
Chesney and Wolfe took their plans to the BBC, who had previously commissioned several of their works. The head of comedy at the BBC, Michael Mills, rejected the project. Less than a week after the BBC's decision, they took it to London Weekend Television (LWT). Frank Muir, a friend of theirs and the head of light entertainment at LWT, accepted the sitcom. Frank Muir suggested Stuart Allen as producer, who had just finished All Gas and Gaiters.

For the character of Stan Butler, Reg Varney was first choice but on a list given to Frank Muir of possible actors, he was second on the list. Ronnie Barker was first and Bernard Cribbins third. They knew that executives usually went for the second choice because it felt safer. For Inspector Blake, Dudley Foster was their first choice but they were unsuccessful in getting him. Both Stephen Lewis and Bob Grant were found by Stuart Allen, who were to play Inspector Blake and Jack Harper respectively. They both came from Mrs Wilson's Diary, a television version of the play directed by Allen. Lewis and Grant had previously written and acted together. Wolfe found the actor for Arthur Rudge easily; he saw Michael Robbins as a bus passenger on television in The Harry Worth Show. In the same week, Robbins was sent another offer for The Dustbinmen which he declined.

The last two members to be cast were Mabel "Mum" Butler and Olive Rudge. Allen wanted Cicely Courtneidge as Mum and she was given the part for just the first series because she had a theatre production in the West End. Doris Hare was chosen to play Mum from the second series. Anna Karen, who played Olive Rudge, was found accidentally. When Karen turned up to rehearsals for Wild, Wild Women, she looked "horrible" because she had the flu and Chesney told Wolfe that she could be Olive.

=== Filming ===
London Transport refused to allow their buses to be used because they thought it would give them a bad reputation. Eastern National Omnibus Company supplied all the buses used in the On the Buses series. Their main bus depot in Wood Green was used for filming too. The depot's exterior was changed for the series, with it appearing to be called the Luxton Bus Company. Reg Varney went to Eastern National's Basildon depot several times for experience and to take his driving test as a bus driver. Varney could legally drive the bus but could not carry passengers.

== Cast ==
- Reg Varney as Stan Butler
- Bob Grant as Jack Harper
- Anna Karen as Olive Rudge
- Cicely Courtneidge as Mabel "Mum" Butler
- Stephen Lewis as Inspector Cyril "Blakey" Blake
- Michael Robbins as Arthur Rudge

== Episodes ==
No. overall	No. in series	Title	Directed by	Written by	Original release date
1	1	"The Early Shift"	Stuart Allen	Ronald Chesney & Ronald Wolfe	28 February 1969
Inspector Blake gives Stan and Jack a new work schedule, which has them both working on the early morning buses with no canteen facilities. An unofficial strike takes place at the bus company with no strike pay. Stan takes part in an early picketing protest and a television crew arrives at the bus depot, giving the strike publicity. This episode was filmed 14 February 1969.
2	2	"The New Conductor"	Stuart Allen	Ronald Chesney & Ronald Wolfe	7 March 1969
Stan has been given a new conductor who turns out to be the attractive clippie Iris. The two of them go on a date after their shift and afterwards, they both go to Stan's house. Mum is not happy about them being at home together and does her best to ruin the romance between them for the evening. This episode was filmed 21 February 1969.
3	3	"Olive Takes a Trip"	Stuart Allen	Ronald Chesney & Ronald Wolfe	14 March 1969
Stan is shocked to hear that Olive is applying for a job as a clippie at his bus company. He thinks Olive does not have a chance of getting the job. However, Mum ensures Olive gets the job by providing false information on the application form. When Olive is given the job, and after a disastrous rehearsal at home, Stan's nightmare worsens when Mum tells Inspector Blake to put Olive on Stan's route to help her out. This results in disaster as Olive falls ill from the exhaust fumes, frequently holding up the bus to get a breath of air, and winds up suffering from motion sickness so severe that Mum takes over and ends up spilling the money satchel and losing all the fares. Stan saves Olive from being sacked by telling Blakey that she is pregnant. This episode was filmed 28 February 1969.
4	4	"Bus Drivers' Stomach"	Stuart Allen	Ronald Chesney & Ronald Wolfe	21 March 1969
Arthur tells Stan that his stomach pains are caused by his poor diet of greasy chips. Stan tells him his condition is known as the "bus driver's stomach", caused by sitting in the bus cab all day long. After Mum hears Arthur reading out aloud from a book about the seriousness of the condition, she puts Stan on a diet. The bus company has announced that all unfit bus drivers are to be given alternative jobs within the company such as cleaning and maintenance jobs. Doctor Clark comes to Stan's house and assesses him, and later Stan passes the company medical. A colleague of Stan's failed the medical and was promoted to the position of bus inspector.
5	5	"The New Inspector"	Stuart Allen	Ronald Chesney & Ronald Wolfe	28 March 1969
Stan applies for the position of bus inspector after he realises the benefits of him getting extra money. Little interest from others for the position means Stan is promoted to inspector. All Stan's colleagues turn against him because of his position and he is removed from the company's darts team. Stan gives up being an inspector and becomes a bus driver again.
6	6	"The Canteen"	Stuart Allen	Ronald Chesney & Ronald Wolfe	4 April 1969
The busmen run the canteen for themselves after they are dissatisfied by the way the management has run it. Shop steward Jack puts Stan in charge of the canteen. Stan has to find a cook and gives the job to Mrs Sharma, his colleague's wife, after telling Stan that she had previously worked as a cook in a bus depot. The next day, Stan realises that Mrs Sharma cannot speak English and previously worked for an Indian bus depot, not an English bus depot. The Indian food she gives the busmen is not the food they want and upsets their stomachs, so Stan fires Mrs Sharma and gives the job to Olive, who is helped by Mum. However, they are unable to cook anything, with Mum unable to use the electric stove which results in her scorching the bottom off the pan and Olive accidentally putting the fish in the deep freeze, so Stan goes to a local fish and chip shop and buys the food for the busmen there. The management take control of the canteen again after the canteen has lost more money than ever before as a result of Stan's actions.
7	7	"The Darts Match"	Stuart Allen	Ronald Chesney & Ronald Wolfe	11 April 1969
The clippies Iris and Jenny challenge Stan and Jack to a darts match, with bets being placed on the result. Preparations taken by Stan are hampered when his favourite set of darts are found in Olive's stew when he practices at home. Iris arranges a date with Stan to distract him from the match. After the clippies win the match, Stan is forced to abandon his date and take Mum home. Note: This is Cicely Courtneidge's final appearance as Mum. She was replaced by Doris Hare in series 2.

== See also ==
- 1969 in British television
