= On the Buses series 5 =

On the Buses
- Series 5
- DVD cover
- No. of episodes: 15

Release
- Original network: ITV
- Original release: 19 September – 26 December 1971

Series chronology
- ← Previous; Series 4 Next → Series 6

The fifth series of On the Buses originally aired between 19 September 1971 and 26 December 1971, beginning with "The Nursery". The series was produced and directed by Derrick Goodwin and designed by Alan Hunter-Craig. All the episodes in this series were written by Ronald Chesney and Ronald Wolfe except for episodes thirteen and fourteen which were written by Bob Grant and Stephen Lewis.

== Cast ==
- Reg Varney as Stan Butler
- Bob Grant as Jack Harper
- Anna Karen as Olive Rudge
- Doris Hare as Mabel "Mum" Butler
- Stephen Lewis as Inspector Cyril "Blakey" Blake
- Michael Robbins as Arthur Rudge

== Episodes ==
No. overall	No. in series	Title	Written by	Original release date
40	1	"The Nursery"	Ronald Chesney & Ronald Wolfe	19 September 1971
41	2	"Stan's Room"	Ronald Chesney & Ronald Wolfe	26 September 1971
42	3	"The Best Man"	Ronald Chesney & Ronald Wolfe	3 October 1971
43	4	"The Inspector's Pets"	Ronald Chesney & Ronald Wolfe	10 October 1971
44	5	"The Epidemic"	Ronald Chesney & Ronald Wolfe	17 October 1971
45	6	"The Busmen's Ball"	Ronald Chesney & Ronald Wolfe	24 October 1971
46	7	"Canteen Trouble"	Ronald Chesney & Ronald Wolfe	31 October 1971
47	8	"The New Nurse"	Ronald Chesney & Ronald Wolfe	7 November 1971
48	9	"Lost Property"	Ronald Chesney & Ronald Wolfe	14 November 1971
49	10	"Stan's Uniform"	Ronald Chesney & Ronald Wolfe	21 November 1971
50	11	"The Strain"	Ronald Chesney & Ronald Wolfe	28 November 1971
51	12	"The New Telly"	Ronald Chesney & Ronald Wolfe	5 December 1971
52	13	"Vacancy for Inspector"	Bob Grant and Stephen Lewis	12 December 1971
53	14	"A Thin Time"	Bob Grant and Stephen Lewis	19 December 1971
54	15	"Boxing Day Social"	Ronald Chesney & Ronald Wolfe	26 December 1971

== See also ==
- 1971 in British television
