= On the Buses series 7 =

On the Buses
- Series 7
- DVD cover
- No. of episodes: 13

Release
- Original network: ITV
- Original release: 26 February – 20 May 1973

Series chronology
- ← Previous; Series 6

The seventh and final series of On the Buses originally aired between 26 February 1973 and 20 May 1973, beginning with "Olive's Divorce". The series producer and director was Bryan Izzard. Various people wrote the episodes of this series. Arthur Rudge never appears in this series and Stan Butler only appears until halfway through the series.

== Cast ==
- Reg Varney as Stan Butler (Episodes 1-7)
- Bob Grant as Jack Harper
- Anna Karen as Olive Rudge
- Doris Hare as Mabel "Mum" Butler
- Stephen Lewis as Inspector Cyril "Blakey" Blake

== Episodes ==
| No. overall | No. in series | Title | Written by | Original release date |
|---|---|---|---|---|
| 62 | 1 | "Olive's Divorce" | Ronald Chesney & Ronald Wolfe | 26 February 1973 |
| 63 | 2 | "The Perfect Clippie" | George Layton & Jonathan Lynn | 4 March 1973 |
| 64 | 3 | "The Ticket Machine" | Bob Grant & Stephen Lewis | 11 March 1973 |
| 65 | 4 | "The Poster" | Wally Malston & Garry Chambers | 18 March 1973 |
| 66 | 5 | "The Football Match" | Bob Grant & Stephen Lewis | 25 March 1973 |
| 67 | 6 | "On the Omnibuses" | Bob Grant & Stephen Lewis | 1 April 1973 |
| 68 | 7 | "Goodbye Stan" | Ronald Chesney & Ronald Wolfe | 8 April 1973 |
| 69 | 8 | "Hot Water" | Bob Grant & Stephen Lewis | 15 April 1973 |
| 70 | 9 | "The Visit" | George Layton & Jonathan Lynn | 22 April 1973 |
| 71 | 10 | "What the Stars Foretell" | Bob Grant & Stephen Lewis | 29 April 1973 |
| 72 | 11 | "The Allowance" | Myles Rudge | 6 May 1973 |
| 73 | 12 | "Friends in High Places" | George Layton & Jonathan Lynn | 13 May 1973 |
| 74 | 13 | "Gardening Time" | Bob Grant & Stephen Lewis | 20 May 1973 |

== See also ==
- 1973 in British television
