= On the Buses series 2 =

On the Buses
- Series 2
- DVD cover
- No. of episodes: 6

Release
- Original network: ITV
- Original release: 31 May – 5 July 1969

Series chronology
- ← Previous; Series 1 Next → Series 3

The second series of On the Buses originally aired between 31 May 1969 and 5 July 1969, beginning with "Family Flu". The series was produced and directed by Stuart Allen, and the designer was Andrew Gardner. All the episodes in this series were written by Ronald Chesney and Ronald Wolfe.

Series 2 was the first series to use the animated sequence that continued to be used until Series 6, and was also the last series to be broadcast in black and white. (with the exception of seven episodes in Series 4 due to the ITV Colour Strike)

== Cast ==
- Reg Varney as Stan Butler
- Bob Grant as Jack Harper
- Anna Karen as Olive Rudge
- Doris Hare as Mabel "Mum" Butler
- Stephen Lewis as Inspector Cyril "Blakey" Blake
- Michael Robbins as Arthur Rudge

== Episodes ==
No. overall	No. in series	Title	Directed by	Written by	Original release date
8	1	"Family Flu"	Stuart Allen	Ronald Chesney & Ronald Wolfe	31 May 1969
When Olive and Mum catch the flu, Stan and Arthur are forced to do all the housekeeping. Stan delays his bus to do the shopping and drops the eggs on the bus floor at the depot, which earns him a scolding from Inspector Blake for storing personal items on the bus. Then Arthur also catches the flu, leaving Stan to do all the work at home. Stan takes the clothes to the launderette while on duty, which lands him in further trouble when Inspector Blake finds the bag. After they recover, Olive, Arthur and Mum decide to visit Aunt Maud and once they have left, Stan catches the flu. This episode was filmed 10 May 1969. Note: First appearance of Doris Hare as Mum.
9	2	"The Used Combination"	Stuart Allen	Ronald Chesney & Ronald Wolfe	7 June 1969
Arthur buys a second-hand motorcycle with a sidecar attached to its side. He is very proud of his purchase, which resembles the motorcycle Stan and Olive's Dad used to court Mum. Stan accidentally breaks the starter and he and Jack are forced to smuggle tools out of the bus depot to fix it. Once the bike is fixed, Arthur takes it on a test run with Mum and Olive. They have to stop far away from home for Olive to use the loo and when she is done, the motor stalls and Arthur ends up breaking the starter again. By fortune, Stan's bus passes by and he agrees to tow the bike, but while doing so, the handlebars break off, forcing Arthur, Mum and Olive to push the bike the rest of the way. At the depot, Inspector Blake finds the handlebars attached to the bus and puts them in the lost property office until Arthur collects them, paying with money he forces Stan to give him in exchange for the trouble he caused. This episode was filmed 23 May 1969.
10	3	"Self Defence"	Stuart Allen	Ronald Chesney & Ronald Wolfe	14 June 1969
Several bus crew staff have been attacked every Saturday night by drunken yobs who rip their advertisements, steal parts and spray paint obscene graffiti on the sides of the buses. When Stan and Jack are the victims of the worst attack yet, with Stan getting his trousers ripped and being unable to pick up the fish and chips for supper, they refuse to work on Saturday nights. Blakey advertises a self-defence class, teaching martial arts, as an alternate solution. The pair are reluctant to join but soon change their minds, chiefly because two attractive conductresses are also in the class. Inevitably the two men get thrown around by the women, much to Blakey's amusement, but they get the last laugh when they discover that Blakey is no woose either. This episode was filmed 29 May 1969.
11	4	"Aunt Maud"	Stuart Allen	Ronald Chesney & Ronald Wolfe	21 June 1969
Mum's sister Maud comes to stay for a few days, but her arrival is chaotic right from the start when she brings her big dog, Marcus, who causes chaos on the bus ride from the airport by scaring the passengers, ripping Jack's pouch and eating the tickets. At home, the living arrangements are altered to suit Aunt Maud, with Stan giving up his bedroom for her and sleeping with Arthur, and Olive sleeping with Mum. Maud also asks embarrassing questions about them, such as why Arthur and Olive do not have any children and why Stan is not married. Stan cannot stop fighting with Arthur so he sleeps on the chair downstairs. On Aunt Maud's return journey, she is forced to take the bus again after she misses her taxi, and Marcus has to ride with Stan in the cab when Jack refuses to let him on the bus. This episode was filmed 6 June 1969.
12	5	"Late Again"	Stuart Allen	Ronald Chesney & Ronald Wolfe	28 June 1969
Stan is unable to juggle his early morning shifts and love life. Stan sleeps through his alarm after having a busy evening with his girlfriend Doreen, and it manages to wake up the rest of the household. Irritated by this, Arthur turns down the volume of the alarm to avoid being woken up, but he leaves it too low and Stan does not hear it either, causing him to oversleep. Jack forges Stan's signature to sign him in for work on time but Stan does not know this and tries to hide that he is late by entering the depot through the toilets. However, he climbs through the women's toilets by mistake, scaring an unattractive clippie and getting caught by Inspector Blake. Stan is forced to work the late shift and Doreen dumps him for Jack. This episode was filmed 13 June 1969.
13	6	"Bon Voyage"	Stuart Allen	Ronald Chesney & Ronald Wolfe	5 July 1969
Stan and Jack are preparing for the staff holiday to Spain. They tell Inspector Blake about their plan to attract the women there by acting as photographers. They demonstrate on a clippie and Inspector Blake. To improve their suntan, they go sunbathing in the cemetery, but Stan forgets to close the bus door and his uniform is stolen. Stan refuses to drive to the depot wearing only his underwear and so wears the top part of Jack's uniform. Inspector Blake tells Stan that he has to pay for a new uniform, and that the money for it will come out of his holiday spending money. Stan packs for the holiday, weighing every item to avoid excess baggage charges. He is unable to take everything in just his suitcase so he puts his items in his overcoat pockets. Stan is then assigned to drive the bus to the airport. This episode was filmed 20 June 1969.

== See also ==
- 1969 in British television
