= Eunice Black =

English actress

- Eunice Black in 1988
- Born: Eunice Holden; 23 October 1914; West Ham, Essex, UK
- Died: 27 August 2007 (aged 92)
- Occupation: Actress

Eunice Black (23 October 1914 — 27 August 2007) was an English character actress best known for her roles in various sitcoms and comedy movies.

== Early life ==
Eunice Black was born on 23 October 1914 in West Ham, Essex, as Eunice Holden.

== Career ==
Black started out at the Unity Theatre, London, before becoming a qualified teacher of English and Drama. She taught both through the Second World War.

=== Television ===
Black appeared in the 1962 Christmas episode of Faces of Jim, 'The Christmas Face of Jim,' opposite Jimmy Edwards, June Whitfield, Ronnie Barker and Michael Brennan. This was her television debut.

Black was a regular supporting cast member on the ITV sitcom On The Buses, appearing in three different roles. Her first appearance was as a traffic warden in 'Mum's Last Fling', series 3, and she reappeared as a 'clippie' called Rosie in two episodes of series 4 titled 'Dangerous Driving' and 'Christmas Duty.' She also played clippies called Gladys in series 6 ('No Smoke Without Fire') and Ada in the first spin-off film On the Buses (1971); and played Mrs Hudson in Holiday on the Buses (1973). These made her one of the On the Buses franchise's most regularly used guest actors.

In addition to this, she appeared as a guest actor on many British sitcoms such as Please Sir!, The Liver Birds, Doctor at Large, George and Mildred, and The Benny Hill Show. Her last sitcom appearance was in a 1988 episode of Last of the Summer Wine.

=== Film ===
Black made her film debut in A Taste of Honey (1961). Other film roles included small appearances in Drop Dead Darling (1966), Chitty Chitty Bang Bang (1968), The Hunchback of Notre Dame (1982), and Bullseye! (1990).

== Death ==
Black died on 27 August 2007 in London, aged 92. Her autobiography, Nine Lives of a Free Spirit, was published the following year.

== Filmography ==
| Year | Title | Role | Notes |
|---|---|---|---|
| 1961 | A Taste of Honey | Schoolteacher | Uncredited |
| 1966 | Drop Dead Darling | Matron | |
| 1968 | Chitty Chitty Bang Bang | Courtier | Uncredited |
| 1970 | Love Is a Splendid Illusion | Second Catty Woman | |
| 1971 | On the Buses | Ada | |
| 1973 | Holiday on the Buses | Mrs. Hudson | |
| 1974 | The Cherry Picker | | |
| 1974 | Sex Play | Miss Grimm | |
| 1982 | The Hunchback of Notre Dame | Clergy | TV movie |
| 1990 | Bullseye! | Old Cleaning Lady | (final film role) |
