= On the Buses series 6 =

On the Buses
- Series 6
- DVD cover
- No. of episodes: 7

Release
- Original network: ITV
- Original release: 20 February – 2 April 1972

Series chronology
- ← Previous; Series 5 Next → Series 7

The sixth series of On the Buses originally aired between 20 February 1972 and 2 April 1972, beginning with "No Smoke Without Fire". The series was produced and directed by Derrick Goodwin for episodes one, four and six and Bryan Izzard for the other episodes. The series designer was Alan Hunter-Craig. Episodes one, three, four and five were written by Bob Grant and Stephen Lewis. Episodes two, six and seven were written by George Layton and Jonathan Lynn.

== Cast ==
- Reg Varney as Stan Butler
- Bob Grant as Jack Harper
- Anna Karen as Olive Rudge
- Doris Hare as Mabel "Mum" Butler
- Stephen Lewis as Inspector Cyril "Blakey" Blake
- Michael Robbins as Arthur Rudge
- Maurice Bush as Basher

== Episodes ==
| No. overall | No. in series | Title | Written by | Original release date |
|---|---|---|---|---|
| 55 | 1 | "No Smoke Without Fire" | Bob Grant & Stephen Lewis | 20 February 1972 |
Stan makes a bet with Jack that he can quit smoking, and within minutes is struggling. His new smoke-free life results in him having a ravenous appetite. When Arthur mocks Stan's attempt to quit smoking, Stan makes a bet with him that he can, Arthur states that they will both give up smoking, and the first one to have a cigarette will lose the bet. Arthur has Stan burn his supply of duty-free cigarettes, whilst sneakily hiding his own share in Olive's knitting bag, burning the empty box. That night, Arthur catches Stan attempting to have secret smoke, whilst Stan catches Arthur attempting to do the same when Mum unknowingly flushes his cigarettes down the toilet, Arthur having hidden them in the cistern. Blake orders Stan and Jack to take an unreliable old bus out, which breaks down on a country lane. Stan attempts to have a secret cigarette, but is forced to sneakily throw it away. He unknowingly disposes of it in a used ticket bin, resulting in the bus being gutted by fire, and the pair having to save Blake from the upper deck via the use of a garden fence. The fire is officially ruled as an electrical fault, Blake is forced to thank the pair for saving him, and Jack reminds Stan that he has lost his bet.
| 56 | 2 | "Love Is What You Make It" | George Layton and Jonathan Lynn | 27 February 1972 |
It is another bright morning in the Butler household as Olive and Arthur can be heard loudly arguing and throwing things at each other upstairs, with both coming down as if nothing has happened. Stan is at the end of his tether with it, and takes Olive to see a marriage councillor, who suggests that she should attempt to do something special. Stan and Mum help Olive organise a romantic candle-lit dinner for her and Arthur, whilst Olive gets dressed up specially for the occasion. Arthur comes home from work, rebuffs her attempts at romance, mocks and insults her appearance, and leaves for the pub, hurting Olive's feelings. Jack comes up with a plan to make Arthur jealous by having him encounter Olive entertaining another man, he selects Blake as his victim. He arranges for Blake to come around to the Butler home that evening, supposedly to discuss the RSPCA with Mum, and Blakey gets into a compromising situation with Olive, quickly leaving as Arthur arrives and loses his temper. The following evening Stan swears to Arthur that he won't get involved again, whilst Arthur confesses that he thought he had lost Olive. The two burst in on Olive entertaining a window cleaner who she had accidentally assumed to be Jack's victim the previous evening. Arthur promises to punish her if she does it again, resulting in an overjoyed Olive, happy that Arthur is jealous, and clearly loves her.
| 57 | 3 | "Private Hire" | Bob Grant & Stephen Lewis | 5 March 1972 |
Stan's bets on the Greyhound racing have fallen through, and he has lost his wages, meaning no housekeeping money for Mum. Jack talks "Basher", a burly man known for threatening violence on those who borrow from him until they pay him back, into lending Stan £5, putting Stan in a situation of potentially being beaten up unless he can repay him by Monday, in two days time. Blake is unhappy over the amount of complaint letters he has been receiving over Stan and Jack, he attempts to get them to take a bus out on a test drive, they refuse, changing their minds after they learn that Iris, an employee at the bus depot, is moving home and the removal men have let her down. Stan and Jack use the bus meant for a test drive as a removal van, an act caught by Blake, resulting in him getting into a situation with a runaway piano. At home, Mum and Olive are preparing the cake for Aunt Maud's birthday, which ends in disaster after Olive reveals she accidentally put milk in the cake mixture, resulting in a sloppy mess, and a mix-up results in Stan putting Arthur's tiling cement on it instead of icing, whilst all of Arthur's tiles fall off the kitchen walls when Mum slams the back door a little too hard. Jack plans to take out a coach for an old folk's outing, charging them, Blake overhears them and agrees to work tomorrow, what would have been his day off. Blake catches them attempting to take the coach without permission, and give the Butlers a free ride to Aunt Maud's house. In order to save Stan's job, Jack informs Blake that Stan was hiring it for the day. Blake seemingly accepts this, appearing to be overcome by the pair's noble deed of taking out the old folk's on their own initiative, then reveals that it costs £30 to hire a coach, taking Stan's £20 and promising to take the rest out of his wages, and also reveals that the coach is only licensed to hold 40, meaning the Butlers will have to find their own way to Aunt Maud's.
| 58 | 4 | "Stan's Worst Day" | Bob Grant & Stephen Lewis | 12 March 1972 |
| 59 | 5 | "Union Trouble" | Bob Grant & Stephen Lewis | 19 March 1972 |
| 60 | 6 | "Bye Bye Blakey" | George Layton & Jonathan Lynn | 26 March 1972 |
| 61 | 7 | "The Prize" | George Layton & Jonathan Lynn | 2 April 1972 |

== See also ==
- 1972 in British television
