= Kate Williams (actress) =

English actress (born 1941)

- Born: 12 December 1941 (age 84); London, England
- Education: East 15 Acting School
- Occupation: Actress
- Years active: 1967–present

Kate Williams (born 12 December 1941) is an English actress best known for playing Joan Booth in Love Thy Neighbour (1972–1976) and Liz Turner in EastEnders (2006–2010).

She has also played Dorothy Burgess in May to December (1989–1994), Myra Costello in Family Affairs (2003–2005) and Auntie Vera in Birds of a Feather (2015–2016) as well as roles in the films Holiday on the Buses (1973) and Quadrophenia (1979).

== Career ==
Williams is known for three television roles: Joan Booth in the 1970s sitcom Love Thy Neighbour; Teresa in the 1971 BBC play Edna, the Inebriate Woman; and Audrey Withey in the crime drama Widows. She reprised the role of Audrey in both Widows 2 (1985), and 1995 sequel She's Out. In addition to her appearance in Holiday on the Buses, in which she played the Holiday Camp nurse, she had previously appeared as Wendy, a brassy conductress, in the fourth episode of the fourth series of On the Buses, the episode entitled "The Other Woman"', and in an earlier episode titled "Late Again"' as a different character called Doreen.

Williams starred in the film version of Love Thy Neighbour (1973), and played Mrs Perkins in the film Melody (1971). Her other film credits include: Poor Cow (1967), Till Death Us Do Part (1969), Holiday on the Buses (1973), What's Up Nurse! (1977), Quadrophenia (1979), Party Party (1983) and Little Dorrit (1987).

Her guest roles on TV include: Dixon of Dock Green, On the Buses, Please Sir!, Minder, The Gentle Touch, Just Good Friends, C.A.T.S. Eyes, Only Fools and Horses, May to December, Murder Most Horrid, Lovejoy, Doctor At Large, Born and Bred, The Bill and Unforgotten.

Williams also appeared in the BBC soap opera EastEnders, playing Liz Turner. Williams returned as a regular character in 2009, but in 2010, it was announced that the character was to be dropped. Williams was last seen in the role in August 2010.

In January 2016, Williams played the role of Sharon and Tracey's 'Auntie' Vera on Birds of a Feather, a role which she went on to reprise in later episodes. In November 2019, she appeared in an episode of the BBC soap opera Doctors as Peggy Sampson. In 2023, she was cast in the BBC medical drama series Casualty, in the recurring role of Stella Lawson.

== Filmography ==
=== Film ===
Year	Title	Role	Notes
1967	Poor Cow	Beryl	
1969	Till Death Us Do Part	Sergeant's Girlfriend	
1971	Edna, the Inebriate Woman	Teresa	
1971	Melody	Mrs Perkins	
1973	Love Thy Neighbour	Joan Booth	
1973	Holiday on the Buses	Red Cross Nurse	
1975	The Golden Cage	Girl in Disco	
1978	What's Up Nurse!	Matron	
1979	Quadrophenia	Mother	
1983	Party Party	Mum	
1987	Little Dorrit	Mrs Greasby	
1993	The Mystery of Edwin Drood	Opium Woman	
2001	Hot Money	Molly Stern	

=== Television ===
Year	Title	Role	Notes
1967	Love Story	Jeopardy	Episode: "Love in a Geary Suit"
1967–1968	The Wednesday Play	Janice, Valerie Chapman	Episodes: "An Officer of the Court", "Mrs. Lawrence Will Look After It"
1969	The Newcomers	Jane Tompkins	2 episodes
1969–1970	On the Buses	Doreen, Wendy	Episode: "Late Again", "The Other Woman"
1969–1971	Dixon of Dock Green	Connie Lester, Jane Simpson, Billie Rogers	Episodes: "Obsession", "The Lag's Brigade", "No One Loses"
1971	Doctor at Large	Mrs Temple	Episode: "Congratulations- It's a Toad!"
1971	Please Sir!	Mrs Davis	Episode: "Identitwit"
1971	Play for Today	Teresa	Episode "Edna, the Inebriate Woman"
1972–1976	Love Thy Neighbour	Joan Booth	54 episodes
1972	All Star Comedy Carnival	Joan Booth	Television film
1976	No Hard Feelings	Elsie	Television film
1977	I'm Bob, He's Dickie		Episode: #1.1
1978–1980	Born and Bred	Marge Benge	12 episodes
1980	Belle Starr	Woman	Television film
1981	A Sharp Intake of Breath	Juliet	Episode: "The Weekend"
1982	Shine on Harvey Moon	Mrs Gold	Episode: "Safe as Houses"
1982	Young at Heart	Alice	2 episodes
1983	The Lady Is a Tramp	Mrs Platt	Episode: "Episode 3"
1983–1985	Widows	Audrey Withey	11 episodes
1983	R.H.I.N.O.	Care Assistant	Television film
1984	Miracles Take Longer	Mrs Anderson	3 episodes
1984	Bottle Boys	Traffic warden	Episode: "Fools Rush In"
1984	The Gentle Touch	Sheila Oates	Episode: "Do It Yourself"
1984	Minder	Mary	Episode: "A Number of Old Wives Tales"
1984	Just Good Friends	Geraldine	Episode: "Special"
1984	Young Ones	Neighbour	Episode: "Cash"
1985, 1992, 1996, 1997	The Bill	Mrs Mullins, Mrs Hunt, Ruth Walker, Rose	Various roles
1985	C.A.T.S. Eyes	Christabel	Episode: "The Double Dutch Deal"
1986	Prospects	Bess	Episode: "Frying Tonight"
1986	Only Fools and Horses	Mrs Miles	Episode: "A Royal Flush"
1988	The Storyteller	Chief Maid	Episode: "Sapsorrow"
1989–1994	May to December	Dorothy Burgess	27 episodes
1989	The Jim Henson Hour	Maid	Episode: "Garbage"
1989	Alas Smith and Jones		2 episodes
1990	Perfect Scoundrels	Brenda	Episode: "Blue Kisses"
1990	This is David Harper	Shirley English	Episode: "Partners in Crime?"
1991	Murder Most Horrid	Woman on bus	Episode: "The Case of the Missing"
1992	Lovejoy	Bella	Episode: "Scotch on the Rocks"
1992	KYTV		Episode: "Talking Heads"
1993	Seekers	Beryl Sinclair	Episode: "Episode 2"
1993	Outside Chance	Ma Conway	Television film
1993	London's Burning	Landlady	Episode: #6.9
1994–1995	Time After Time	Ma Conway	7 episodes
1994	She's Out	Audrey Withey	4 episodes
1995	Dressing for Breakfast	Joan	Episode: "Hospital"
1996	Porkpie	Sheila	Episode: "Birth Rites"
1998	Berkeley Square	Mrs McClusky	10 episodes
2000	Randall & Hopkirk (Deceased)	Mrs Coles	Episode: "Mental Apparition Disorder"
2001	Best of Both Worlds	Brigitte	2 episodes
2002	Silent Witness	Bea Johnson	Episode: "Tell No Tales: Part 2"
2003	In Deep	Rose	4 episodes
2003	Danielle Cable: Eyewitness	Neighbour	Television film
2003–2005	Family Affairs	Myra Costello	64 episodes
2006–2010	EastEnders	Liz Turner	69 episodes
2008	Hughie Green, Most Sincerely	Mrs Carr	Television film
2010	Silent Witness	Glenda Carmody	Episode: "Run: Part 2"
2011	Holby City	Catherine Salter	Episode: "Too Much Monkey Business"
2014	Casualty	Rosie Cornwall	Episode: "The Quiet Man"
2014	Doctors	Dora Harrington	Episode: "Golden Boy"
2015–2016	Birds of a Feather	Auntie Vera	3 episodes
2015	Man Down	Rachel	Episode: "Dennis"
2017	Call the Midwife	Ivy Jackson	Episode: #6.5
2018	Hetty Feather	Mrs. Whittock	6 episodes
2019	Doctors	Peggy Sampson	Episode: "Every Dog Has Its Day"
2021	Unforgotten	Mary Quinn	Episode: #4.5
2023	Casualty	Stella Lawson	Recurring role
