= On the Buses series 4 =

On the Buses
- Series 4
- DVD cover
- No. of episodes: 13

Release
- Original network: ITV
- Original release: 27 November 1970 – 21 February 1971

Series chronology
- ← Previous; Series 3 Next → Series 5

The fourth series of On the Buses originally aired between 27 November 1970 and 21 February 1971, beginning with "Nowhere to Go". The series was produced and directed by Stuart Allen and designed by Alan Hunter-Craig. All the episodes in this series were written by Ronald Chesney and Ronald Wolfe.

Due to the ITV Colour Strike, episodes 5, 8, 9, 10, 11, 12 and 13 of Series 4, were recorded in black-and-white.

== Cast ==
- Reg Varney as Stan Butler
- Bob Grant as Jack Harper
- Anna Karen as Olive Rudge
- Doris Hare as Mabel "Mum" Butler
- Stephen Lewis as Inspector Cyril "Blakey" Blake
- Michael Robbins as Arthur Rudge

== Episodes ==
No. overall	No. in series	Title	Written by	Original release date
27	1	"Nowhere to Go"	Ronald Chesney & Ronald Wolfe	27 November 1970
28	2	"The Canteen Girl"	Ronald Chesney & Ronald Wolfe	4 December 1970
29	3	"Dangerous Driving"	Ronald Chesney & Ronald Wolfe	11 December 1970
30	4	"The Other Woman"	Ronald Chesney & Ronald Wolfe	18 December 1970
31	5	"Christmas Duty"	Ronald Chesney & Ronald Wolfe	25 December 1970
32	6	"The 'L' Bus"	Ronald Chesney & Ronald Wolfe	1 January 1971
33	7	"The Kids' Outing"	Ronald Chesney & Ronald Wolfe	10 January 1971
34	8	"The Anniversary"	Ronald Chesney & Ronald Wolfe	17 January 1971
35	9	"Cover Up"	Ronald Chesney & Ronald Wolfe	24 January 1971
36	10	"Safety First"	Ronald Chesney & Ronald Wolfe	31 January 1971
37	11	"The Lodger"	Ronald Chesney & Ronald Wolfe	7 February 1971
38	12	"The Injury"	Ronald Chesney & Ronald Wolfe	14 February 1971
39	13	"Not Tonight"	Ronald Chesney & Ronald Wolfe	21 February 1971

== See also ==
- 1970 in British television
- 1971 in British television
