= Rep (TV series) =

British television series

- Genre: Sitcom
- Written by: Ray Taylor; Digby Wolfe
- Directed by: Bryan Izzard
- Starring: Iain Cuthbertson; Stephen Lewis; Patsy Rowlands; John Fraser
- Country of origin: United Kingdom
- Original language: English
- No. of series: 1
- No. of episodes: 4

Production
- Running time: 30 minutes
- Production company: Granada Television

Original release
- Network: ITV
- Release: 9 July – 30 July 1982

Rep is a 1982 British sitcom television series starring Iain Cuthbertson, Stephen Lewis, Patsy Rowlands and John Fraser. Four episodes were produced for Granada Television.

== Episodes ==
No.	Title	Directed by	Written by	Original release date
1	"The Angry Twilight"	Bryan Izzard	Ray Taylor and Digby Wolfe	9 July 1982
2	"No Tears for McTavish"	Bryan Izzard	Ray Taylor and Digby Wolfe	16 July 1982
3	"She Knew Her Onions"	Bryan Izzard	Ray Taylor and Digby Wolfe	23 July 1982
4	"Frippery Tip"	Bryan Izzard	Ray Taylor and Digby Wolfe	30 July 1982
