= On the Buses (film) =

1971 British comedy film by Harry Booth

- Theatrical release poster
- Directed by: Harry Booth
- Written by: Ronald Chesney; Ronald Wolfe
- Produced by: Ronald Chesney; Ronald Wolfe
- Starring: Reg Varney; Doris Hare; Stephen Lewis; Michael Robbins; Bob Grant; Anna Karen
- Cinematography: Mark McDonald
- Edited by: Archie Ludski
- Music by: Max Harris
- Production companies: Hammer Film Productions; EMI Elstree
- Distributed by: MGM-EMI Film Distributors
- Release date: 8 August 1971 (UK)
- Running time: 88 minutes
- Country: United Kingdom
- Language: English
- Budget: £90,000
- Box office: £2,500,000

On the Buses is a 1971 British comedy film directed by Harry Booth and starring Reg Varney, Doris Hare, Michael Robbins, Anna Karen, Stephen Lewis and Bob Grant. The film was written and produced by Ronald Chesney and Ronald Wolfe for Hammer Films.

It was the first spin-off film from the TV sitcom On the Buses (1969–1973) and was followed by two further films, Mutiny on the Buses (1972) and Holiday on the Buses (1973). The films are set within a slightly different canon from the TV series: Stan and Jack work for a different bus company (Town & District instead of Luxton & District), and the three films form a loose story arc where Arthur and Olive become parents (despite their apparently sexless marriage).

== Plot ==
Stan Butler, a bus driver for the Town & District bus company, worries that the overtime pay he makes will soon end when the company rectifies its current lack of employees. His concerns become justified when the company decides to revoke a long-standing rule that prevents women from being employed as bus drivers, much to the chagrin of both Stan and his long-time colleague and friend, Jack. Stan's loss of his overtime forces him to persuade his sister Olive to work in the company's canteen. Following a disastrous start, she and her husband, Arthur, soon discover that she is pregnant, resulting in her losing her job. At the same time, Stan gets into trouble with the company while attempting to recover something of Jack's from a woman he had been seeing, when he manages to inadvertently demolish both a telephone kiosk and a bus shelter in trying to avoid being caught by the woman's jealous husband. Blakey, the bus company's Inspector, takes delight in informing Stan that he has to undertake a driving test on a bus skid pan in order to keep his job. However, Blakey soon regrets supervising the test when Stan gets his own back by beginning the test with Blakey still on the training bus.

Stan manages to pass the test, but he soon becomes worried that the employment of women drivers will affect both his and Jack's layabout lifestyle at the company. It would also reduce their pay and prevent Jack from conducting amorous flings with women on the company's time. The pair decide that the best way to prevent this from happening is to sabotage the company's new employment scheme by making the women drivers look bad, and initially pull off small pranks. Later, Stan and Jack plant spiders in the cabs of the women's buses, causing further disruption with their driving. These, however, have little effect, until Stan comes up with the idea of lacing their tea with a diuretic. This results in the women drivers being forced to make frequent toilet stops whilst on their routes resulting in multiple delays.

As Olive's pregnancy draws closer to term, Arthur requests Stan's help in fixing the springs on his motorcycle's sidecar to prepare it for the trip to the hospital. At the depot, he and Jack discover that the company recently ordered a number of road diversion signs. Deciding to take advantage of this, the pair arrange for more signs to be made and plant them out on the women's routes. One such false diversion causes a woman driver to get forced onto a motorway, causing her and Blakey, who was on board, to get in trouble with the police.

Olive gives birth to a baby son, but the joyful arrival soon brings disruptions to the Butler household as they struggle to cope with the new child. Meanwhile, Stan and Jack are delighted to learn their sabotage efforts were a success when the company announces its decision to no longer employ women bus drivers. Their celebration is short-lived, however, when they learn that Blakey re-hired the women drivers they tormented as inspectors, and they promptly separate the two onto different routes. Although the pair are not happy about this and intend to quit their jobs, Stan soon sees a silver lining to their situation when he is twinned with Sandra, a new attractive female clippie for his route, whom he gets along well with.

== Cast ==
- Reg Varney as Stan Butler
- Doris Hare as Mum
- Michael Robbins as Arthur Rudge
- Anna Karen as Olive Rudge
- Stephen Lewis as Inspector Cyril 'Blakey' Blake
- Bob Grant as Jack Harper
- Brian Oulton as manager
- Andria Lawrence as Betty
- Pat Ashton as Sally
- Jeanne Varney (daughter of Reg Varney) as Mavis
- Pamela Cundell as Ruby
- Pat Coombs as Vera
- Eunice Black as Ada
- Wendy Richard as housewife
- Peter Madden as Mr. Brooks
- David Lodge as Fred the busman
- Brenda Gogan as Bridget
- Caroline Dowdeswell as Sandra
- Nosher Powell as Betty's husband
- Terry Duggan as Nobby
- Norman Mitchell as London Transport official
- Claire Davenport as Peggy
- Maggie Rennie as Gladys
- Tex Fuller as Harry
- Anna Michaels as Eileen
- Ivor Salter as First Policeman
- George Roderick as second policeman
- Gavin Campbell as motorcycle cop
- David Rowlands as parson
- Hilda Barry as old woman
- Moira Foot as Katy
- Reginald Peters as medical orderly
- Caroline Munro as poster girl (uncredited)

== Production ==
Hammer signed a deal with EMI Films to make a series of movies, mostly horror films but one comedy, On the Buses. The film was reportedly the idea of Brian Lawrence, Hammer executive. It was Hammer's first comedy in a decade.

The film was made on location and at Elstree Studios at Borehamwood, Hertfordshire. Stage 5 at Elstree was used for the exteriors of the bus station both in this film and in the sequels.

The film includes shots of a London AEC Routemaster RM200 (VLT 200) undergoing the skid tests at the Chiswick Works skidpad. Stephen Lewis performed part of the stunt himself where Blakey is hanging off the rear platform of the bus while it skids at high speed. Lewis was attached to the inside of the bus with a hidden rope while the camera filmed him from inside. Only the exterior shots where he finally falls off was performed by a stuntman.

The buses used in road shots were Eastern National Bristol KSW5Gs numbered 2359 (VNO857), 2367 (VNO862), 2371 (VNO866) and 2376 (WNO476).

== Music ==
The lyrics to the "On The Buses" theme song (composed by Geoff Unwin and Roger Ferris) were written by Ferris, who produced the recording at Abbey Road Studios. Quinceharmon's vocal performance was released in 1971 on EMI's Columbia label.

== Release ==
The film opened at the ABC Ardwick & Studio 2 cinemas, both in Manchester, on 1 August 1971.

== Reception ==
=== Box office ===
The film was the second most popular movie at the British box office in 1971 and had earned EMI a profit of £106,000 by June 1972. It eventually earned £1,500,000 in the UK and £1,000,000 overseas, making a profit to Hammer of £532,000. Its box office gross was nearly 28 times its budget.

In 1994 Bryan Forbes claimed the film had made a profit of over £1 million.

=== Critical reception ===
The Monthly Film Bulletin wrote, "The latest film to exploit the success of a TV comedy series, On the Buses reaches a new low in British production standards. Most of it is in medium shot, flatly lit, edited and directed with little indication of pace or structure, and processed in extraordinarily bad colour. The attitudes informing the script – of idiot sexuality and rabid anti-feminism – are unpleasant in the extreme, with all the women drivers depicted as stupid cows of the butch Lesbian school, for no reason other than their take-over of men's work. The script is simply a series of old situation jokes and bad puns. By comparison, there is suddenly a lot to be said for the cheerful, vulgar knockabout of the Carry On... series."

Reviewing On the Buses in The Spectator, Christopher Hudson called it "a dullish adaptation of the ITV series".

The Radio Times Guide to Films gave the film 1/5 stars, writing, "Nostalgia masochists should account for the bulk of those tuning in to this atrocious film, in which women drivers are taken on at Blakey's depot, much to the frustration of those 'lovable' misogynists Reg Varney and Bob Grant."

Film critic Leslie Halliwell wrote, "Grotesque, ham-handed farce from a TV series which was sometimes funny; this is merely vulgar."
