= Holiday on the Buses =

1973 British comedy film by Bryan Izzard

- Directed by: Bryan Izzard
- Written by: Ronald Chesney; Ronald Wolfe
- Produced by: Ronald Chesney; Ronald Wolfe
- Starring: Reg Varney; Doris Hare; Bob Grant; Anna Karen; Michael Robbins; Stephen Lewis
- Cinematography: Brian Probyn
- Edited by: James Needs
- Music by: Denis King
- Production company: Hammer Films
- Distributed by: MGM-EMI
- Release date: 26 December 1973
- Running time: 85 minutes
- Country: United Kingdom
- Language: English

Holiday on the Buses is a 1973 British comedy film directed by Bryan Izzard and starring Reg Varney, Doris Hare, Michael Robbins, Anna Karen, Stephen Lewis and Bob Grant. It was produced by Ronald Chesney and Ronald Wolfe for Hammer Films, and is the third and final spin-off film from the ITV sitcom On the Buses. It succeeded the films On the Buses (1971) and Mutiny on the Buses (1972). A fourth film had been planned, but was cancelled.

== Plot ==
The negligent bus driving of Stan Butler, a driver for the Town & District bus company, finally causes a major accident in the garage forecourt. The first one injures Blakey, this being caused by Stan not focusing on the road after a woman suffered a wardrobe malfunction with her top and almost running into a car brakes hard with Blakey falling off. The second accident (thanks to Jack not looking behind) being damaging the manager's car from accidentally reversing into it and trapping the manager underneath the bonnet. The final accident once again after not concentrating on the road being the wrecking of two of the company's buses after another crashes into the side of Stan's bus. As a result of this, both he and Blakey are sacked, along with Stan's close friend and conductor, Jack. Forced to look for new jobs, after failing to find work at the labour exchange and being out of work for weeks, Jack comes across an advert in a newspaper looking for a bus crew and suggests that both he and Stan go for an interview to see if they can get the advertised job. Stan and Jack manage to secure the job and started work at a Pontins holiday camp in Prestatyn, North Wales, as a bus crew for its tour bus. But their joy is short-lived when they discover that Blakey, whose foot is still recovering, also has a job at the camp as its new security inspector. Despite this, Stan decides to invite his family to stay there for a holiday on his staff discount, though his tight-fisted brother-in-law, Arthur, refuses to pay for the train fare, instead relying on his motorcycle and sidecar to transport the Butler family, consisting of himself, Stan's Mum, his wife and Stan's sister Olive, and his son Little Arthur. However, a mishap while travelling to the camp leads to them losing most of their luggage in the river, while one case they recover is so filled with mud that the clothes inside are ruined.

Meanwhile, as the Butler family try to begin enjoying their holiday, Blakey decides to keep a watchful eye on Stan and Jack as they get up to their usual tricks and misadventures, all while spending time with the camp's nurse, whom he loves, and using his spare time to teach an old-time dancing class to some of the camp's guests. At the same time, Mum encounters an Irish widower by the name of Bert, whom she forms a close friendship with upon learning he is holidaying at the camp. While working the tour bus, Stan makes attempts to snare the affections of a female guest by the name of Mavis, but is repeatedly thwarted by her overbearing mother. One occasion being when her mother asked Mavis to join her for a bicycle ride, the second when acting as lifeguards when they had no driving to do on the day & the third being her mother interrupting them when Stan asked Mavis to join him for a drink (her mother decides to join the two of them). Stan then attempts to woo a member of staff, Sandra, despite this being against his terms of employment. When he does manage to secure some time with her, he becomes obliged by the family to babysit Little Arthur, but is so focused with Sandra, he inadvertently allows his nephew to get hold of a water pistol which Little Arthur fills with ink and he sprays around one of the bedrooms of the Butlers' chalet. Horrified, knowing that they would have to pay for the damage as it wasn't minor, the Butlers become forced to redecorate the chalet before Blakey or the management find out as Stan would get sacked.

Seeking to make up for the disaster, Stan takes the family on a boat cruise, using it as a final attempt to seduce Mavis, but this fails when he struggles with the stormy seas, eventually succumbing to seasickness while Jack takes advantage to steal his love. Although the repainting goes well upon the Butler's return the paintwork is still wet requiring six hours to dry, as a result of Olive not being able to find the light switch as there wasn't a bedside lamp, she ruins it during the night by leaving handprints over the painted walls while trying to find the room's light switch. This forces Arthur and Stan to redo the work the next day with Stan telling them not to mess it up again as they'd now used up all the paint. Once finished, Arthur decides to use petrol from his motorcycle to clean the brushes, yet in doing so, neglects to tell anyone that Olive poured it down the toilet, resulting in it being blown up when Stan carelessly discards a cigarette into it. Needing to once again repair the damage, Stan and Jack steal a new toilet from the camp's stores, while having Olive and Arthur join Blakey's old-time dancing class in order to divert the Inspector's attention. Olive however manages to break her glasses and because the toilet in their chalet is not finished she loses her way and winds up going into the wrong chalet and another man's bed by mistake.

Shortly after repairing the damage, Stan attempts to win the affections of Maria, an Italian woman who works at the staff canteen and cleans the manager's chalet, unaware that her brother Luigi, a chef in the staff canteen, is overprotective of her, but on the night that he tries to seduce her in the manager's chalet, he is forced to hide when the manager and his wife return earlier than he expected. The next morning, Blakey jumps to conclusions about Stan's fling and informs Luigi of what he misheard. At first Luigi doesn't believe Blakey but will have a talk with Stan, however after he sees Maria kiss Stan he grabs hold of Stan pulling him into the kitchen and promptly leading beats up Stan. However, the Inspector's joy is short-lived when Luigi angrily accuses him of lying, after the manager, unaware of the truth, reveals that no such amorous event occurred in his chalet as he and his wife were only out for a few minutes. Later that day in the nurses office, after Stan had been seen to after his injuries received in the beat-up, Jack visits the nurse for a quick fling, having been doing so behind Blakey's back, but is forced to leave through the window when Blakey comes to see her, accidentally leaving behind his jacket in her office. When the Inspector finds them, he wrongly believes Stan is seeing her and, in a fit of rage, chases him. This proves to be the final straw for the manager who sacks Blakey for having romantic liaisons with the nurse against staff policies.

For the Butler family, their holiday ends with reasonable success despite the mishaps, though as they return home, they suffer one more mishap when they lose their luggage once again in the same river (mainly thanks to Olive). Meanwhile, Stan and Jack, delighted that Blakey is now gone, set their sights on two new female guests, and borrow the bus for an evening trip to the beach. However, the pair panic when the bus sinks into wet sand and cannot be moved, leading them to decide to wait until morning to try moving it again believing that the sand will have dried out by then. When they first return to move the bus next morning they find that the tide is partly in and believing the tide is going out choose to return an hour later, this later decision however leads to the bus being completely submerged by the tide and the pair are promptly sacked for their actions. Left on the dole again Stan and Jack return to the labour exchange for new jobs, only to find that Blakey to their horror is now a clerk at the exchange. Although he initially gloats over Stan's predicament, he eventually provides him a job appropriate for someone who is "always smashing things up". The story ends with Stan as the driver of a wrecking ball for a demolition company, bringing down a building.

== Cast ==
- Reg Varney as Stan Butler
- Doris Hare as Mabel "Mum" Butler
- Michael Robbins as Arthur Rudge
- Anna Karen as Olive Rudge
- Stephen Lewis as Inspector Cyril "Blakey" Blake
- Bob Grant as Jack Harper
- Wilfrid Brambell as Bert Thompson
- Kate Williams as Red Cross nurse
- Arthur Mullard as Wally Briggs
- Queenie Watts as Lily Briggs
- Henry McGee as holiday camp manager
- Adam Rhodes as Little Arthur
- Michael Sheard as depot manager
- Hal Dyer as Mrs. Coombs
- Franco De Rosa as Luigi
- Gigi Gatti as Maria
- Maureen Sweeney as Mavis
- Eunice Black as Mrs Hudson (Mavis' mum)
- Sandra Bryant as Sandra
- Carolae Donoghue as Doreen
- Annette Long as Betty
- Tara Lynn as Joyce
- Harry Fielder as busman
- Alex Munro as patient

== Production ==
It was filmed on location at The Pontin's Holiday Camp, Prestatyn, North Wales. Interiors were completed at EMI-MGM Elstree Studios, Borehamwood. Scenes were also filmed at Dyserth, at the Waterfall Shop. Other locations include Rhuddlan and Rhyl.

The open top bus was XFM 229, a Bristol LD new to Crosville Motor Services which was scrapped in 1982.

The film marked the final appearances of Reg Varney and Michael Robbins in the On the Buses franchise, the actors having already left the TV series in its final season which aired the same year of the film's release.

== Critical reception ==
The Monthly Film Bulletin wrote: "Dire third spin-off from the television series, in which Queenie Watts and Arthur Mullard eventually crop up in a guest capacity to demonstrate that the art of getting a laugh is not yet, as one had begun to think, quite dead. For the rest, Anna Karen once more sacrifices all human dignity for the part of Olive, while Reg Varney, Bob Grant, and in particular Stephen Lewis, all grunt, groan and emit dirty sniggers every time a 'piece of skirt' comes into view."

The Radio Times Guide to Films gave the film 1/5 stars, writing: "After 1971's On the Buses and Mutiny on the Buses (1972), this third movie culled from the hit TV series is one of the worst films you'll ever see. Having been sacked from the bus depot, Stan and Jack fetch up at a Welsh holiday camp. The film's only achievement is the sheer amount of smutty sniggering it manages to cram into 85 minutes. Absolutely abysmal."

Hugh Leonard writing in the Sunday Independent gave the film zero stars out of four, commenting "This one should be buried in unhallowed ground."
