= The Rag Trade =

British TV sitcom (1961–1978)

- Actresses Sheila Hancock, Esma Cannon and Miriam Karlin
- Created by: Chesney and Wolfe
- Starring: Peter Jones; Miriam Karlin; Sheila Hancock; Barbara Windsor; Reg Varney; Esma Cannon; Wanda Ventham; Ann Beach; Christopher Beeny; Anna Karen; Gillian Taylforth; Deddie Davies; Diane Langton
- Country of origin: United Kingdom
- Original language: English
- No. of series: 5
- No. of episodes: 58 (16 missing)

Production
- Producers: Dennis Main Wilson (BBC); Bryan Izzard (LWT)
- Running time: 30 minutes
- Production companies: BBC (Series 1–3); LWT (Series 4–5)

Original release
- Network: BBC
- Release: 6 October 1961 – 30 March 1963
- Network: ITV
- Release: 11 September 1977 – 20 October 1978

The Rag Trade is a British television sitcom broadcast by the BBC between 1961 and 1963 and by ITV between 1977 and 1978. Although a comedy, it shed light on gender, politics and the "class war" on the factory floor.

The scripts were written by partners Chesney and Wolfe, who later wrote Wild, Wild Women, Meet the Wife and On the Buses. Wild, Wild Women was a period variation of The Rag Trade.

== Synopsis ==
The action centred on a fictional small clothing workshop (the title is a reference to the textile industry), Fenner's Fashions in London. Although run by Harold Fenner (Peter Jones) and the foreman and pattern cutter Reg Turner (Reg Varney), the female workers are led by militant shop steward Paddy Fleming (Miriam Karlin), ever ready to strike, with the catchphrase "Everybody out!" Other cast members included Sheila Hancock (as Carole Taylor), Esma Cannon (as Lily Swann), Wanda Ventham (as Shirley) in series 2 and Barbara Windsor (as Gloria, during series 1, who later returned as Judy in series 3) replacing Sheila Hancock.

In 1975, a colour pilot was made; with only Peter Jones reprising his role; this pilot featured a young Tony Robinson (replacing Reg Varney), Gaye Brown (briefly replacing Karlin), Jumoke Debayo, Diane Langton, Annabel Leventon, Jamila Massey, Mollie Maureen (replacing Esma Cannon) and Trixie Scales.

The theme tune for this colour pilot was performed by Alex Welsh and his Band. However, this was never transmitted, as the BBC rejected the colour revival of the series.

Two years later, the series was revived by ITV company LWT, with Jones and Karlin reprising their roles. The 1977–78 version ran for two series, most of the scripts being based on the BBC episodes from the 1960s, and featured Anna Karen (reprising her role as Olive from On the Buses) and future EastEnders star Gillian Taylforth as factory workers.

The theme tune for the LWT series was written and performed by Lynsey de Paul (credited as Joan Brown and listed in the closing credits as "The Rag Trade Rag"). It was released as a track on an album of TV themes that also featured another de Paul-penned theme "Hi Summer".

In 1990, the series was remade as Fredrikssons Fabrikk by NRK in Norway. The cast comprised both Norwegian and Swedish actors, and the series was broadcast by SVT in Sweden as well. It ran for three seasons (1990–93, with 17 30-minute episodes and one 45-minute special) and a feature film version Fredrikssons Fabrikk – The Movie in 1994 with a script credited to Chesney and Wolfe, and Norwegian series writer Andreas Markusson.

== Cast ==
=== All series ===
- Peter Jones as Harold Fenner
- Miriam Karlin as Patricia "Paddy" Fleming

=== 1961–1963 ===
- Reg Varney as Reg Turner
- Esma Cannon as Lily Swann (series 1–2)
- Sheila Hancock as Carole Taylor (series 1–2)
- Barbara Windsor as Gloria (series 1) and Judy (series 3)
- Ann Beach as Brenda (series 1)
- Rita Smythe as Rita (series 1)
- Wanda Ventham as Shirley (series 2–3)
- Patricia Denys as Betty (series 3)
- Stella Tanner as Olive (series 3)
- Carmel Cryan as Gloria (series 3)
- Amanda Reiss as Janet (series 3)
- Irene Handl as Mrs Turner (series 3)

=== 1977–1978 ===
- Anna Karen as Olive Rudge
- Christopher Beeny as Tony
- Gillian Taylforth as Lyn
- Diane Langton as Kathy
- Deddie Davies as Mabel
- Lucita Lijertwood as Jojo
- Rowena Cooper as Mrs Fenner (series 4)
- Joy Stewart as Mrs Fenner (series 5)

== TV episodes ==
On original transmission many episodes of the original BBC TV series of The Rag Trade were not given titles, so some are from production notes and repeat screenings.

=== Original BBC TV series ===
==== Series 1 (1961) ====
Title	Airdate	Description	Notes
"The Baby"	6 October 1961	Fenner is far from happy when factory girl Brenda (Ann Beach) brings her baby to work.	
"Getting Married"	13 October 1961	Paddy must find Carole a wedding dress.	
"Early Start"	20 October 1961	Fenner finds himself up against new factory Parks & Spicer	Guest Stars: Frank Thornton and Raymond Glendenning
"French Fashions"	27 October 1961	Carole stands for a modelling competition	Guest Star: Peter Gilmore
"The Sample"	3 November 1961	Paddy gives Carol a dress to go on a date with, but soon realizes the dress was specially made for a customer	
"Unhappy Customer"	10 November 1961	Fenner bans food in the workroom when an unhappy customer complains about Fenners Fashion	Guest Star: Brian Oulton
Episode 7	17 November 1961	Fenners Fashion stands to win a contract with the biggest clothes store in London	Guest Star: Hugh Paddick
"Doctor's Orders"	24 November 1961	Fenners Fashion are hired to design TV costumes	Guest Stars: Roy Stephens and Monte Landis
"The Italian Designer"	1 December 1961	To win a contract with a female buyer Reg masquerades as Roberto, an Italian designer.	
"Christmas Box"	8 December 1961	In a bid to make more money for Christmas, Paddy and the girls go behind Fenner's back and start working for another company making Golliwogs	Guest Stars: Terry Scott, Colin Douglas and Edward Caddick

==== Series 2 (1962) ====
Title	Airdate	Description	Notes
"The Thief"	6 April 1962	There's a thief at Fenners Fashion and Paddy is determined to find out who	
"The Dog"	13 April 1962	Lily's dog runs riot at Fenners Fashion	Guest Stars: Patrick Cargill and Betty Huntley-Wright
"Locked In"	20 April 1962	Reg gets locked in the workroom just as an inspector arrives	Guest Stars: June Whitfield and Alec Ross
"The Flat"	27 April 1962	With Fenner still in Amsterdam, Paddy and Reg are given the task of painting his flat	
Episode 5	4 May 1962	Paddy and Carole take the day off but soon find themselves in trouble when Fenner unexpectedly returns	This is a missing episode Guest Star: Norman Mitchell
"The Client"	11 May 1962	An important rich client is coming to Fenners Fashion and the girls decide to take him out for the day	Guest Stars: Bill Shine and Willoughby Goddard
"Stay-In Strike"	18 May 1962	Fenner's new assistant forces the staff to go on strike	Guest Stars: Lynda Baron and Barry Linehan
"The Fish And Chip Shop"	25 May 1962	Reg and Paddy agree to take over a fish and chip shop	This is a missing episode Guest Stars: Charlie Bird, William Kendall, Frank Peters and Harry Landis
"Safety Precaution"	1 June 1962	Fenner faces money troubles when Reg destroys a load of dresses	Guest Stars: Dilys Laye and Jean Conroy
"Stainproofer"	8 June 1962	The girls end up ruining Fenners' new coat and have to work fast to replace it	Guest Stars: Fabia Drake and Jean Conroy
"Doctor"	15 June 1962	The arrival of a handsome doctor causes trouble for Fenner and Carole	Guest Stars: Noel Trevarthen, Richard Caldicot and Jean Conroy
"Barber's Shop"	22 June 1962	When Fenner refuses the girls a raise, they decide to start running a laundry cleaning service from inside Fenner's Fashions, their source of dirty laundry coming from a barber shop owner.	Guest Stars: George Roderick, Barbara Keogh and Jean Conroy
"The Bank Manager"	29 June 1962	A bank manager threaten to close Fenners Fashion	Guest Stars: Ronnie Barker, Hugh Paddick and Jean Conroy

Christmas Night with the Stars 25 December 1962 – featured a short sketch. (Has been lost)

==== Series 3 (1963) ====
Title	Airdate	Description	Notes
"The Australian"	5 January 1963	Fenner and Paddy try to find Reg a woman	This is a missing episode Guest Stars: Aubrey Morris, Philip Grout, Sheena Marshe and Claire Davenport
"Triplets":	12 January 1963		This is a missing episode
Episode 3	19 January 1963	Fenners hires Reg's mother as his new assistant	This is a missing episode
Episode 4	26 January 1963		This is a missing episode Guest Stars: Sheena Marshe and Claire Davenport
"Baby Dolls"	2 February 1963	Fenner becomes obsessed with horse racing	This episode was rediscovered in 2018, and is currently the only surviving episode of Series 3
"Mistaken Tax"	9 February 1963	Reg's lies over his tax forms come back to haunt him	This is a missing episode
"After The Ball"	16 February 1963	Fenner has to pretend Judy is his daughter when they go to represent Fenners Fashion at a ball	This is a missing episode Guest Star: Jack Smethurst
"The Budgie"	23 February 1963		This is a missing episode Guest Star: Peter Howell
Episode 9	2 March 1963		This is a missing episode
"The Italian Girl"	9 March 1963	Judy accuses Reg of having an affair	This is a missing episode
"Babysitters Unlimited":	16 March 1963	Fenner finds himself in debt with only the girls to help him	This is a missing episode Guest Star: Frank Coda
"National Productivity Year"	23 March 1963	Paddy's job is on the line when another strike attempt sadly backfires	This is a missing episode
"The Engagement Ring"	30 March 1963	Reg and Judy's engagement party is ruined when the engagement ring is stolen	This is a missing episode Guest Star: Patrick Newell

==== Colour pilot (1975) ====
Title	Airdate	Description	Notes
Colour pilot	Unaired		Only Peter Jones reprised his role from the 1961–63 BBC series in this untransmitted BBC colour pilot, which featured a young Tony Robinson (replacing Reg Varney), Gaye Brown (briefly replacing Miriam Karlin), Jumoke Debayo, Diane Langton, Annabel Leventon, Jamila Massey, Mollie Maureen (replacing Esma Cannon) and Trixie Scales

=== LWT relaunch series ===
==== Series 4 (1977) ====
Title	Airdate	Description	Notes
"Stay-In Strike"	10 September 1977	A new arrangement in the workroom sparks off confrontation between Fenner and Paddy	Aired 10 September in Granada region only. Aired 11 September in all other regions.
"The Sample"	18 September 1977	Kathy steals a new dressing gown to impress her new boyfriend	
"Fixing The Rate"	25 September 1977	Fenner becomes obsessed with Time and Money, giving Paddy an idea of money making	
"The Lunch Problem"	2 October 1977	When Fenner refuses to open a canteen, the girls decide to run their own canteen	
"The Export Order"	9 October 1977	Fenner's Fashion is falling fast and Fenner is determined to make some changes	
"The Italian Line"	16 October 1977	A handsome Italian threatens to drive everyone out of Fenner's Fashion	
"Olive's Baby"	23 October 1977	The staff go on strike in a bid to help Olive look after her baby son	
"The Wedding Dress"	30 October 1977	Fenner discovers the work force are making their own clothes	
"The Sideline"	6 November 1977	Paddy gets attacked by a dishonest man and struggles to hold the workforce together	
"The Guv'nor's Wife"	13 November 1977	Mrs Fenner's dreams of meeting Margaret Thatcher land Fenner's Fashion in trouble	
"The New Girl"	20 November 1977	Fenner's new assistant takes a shine to the girls	
"The Bet"	27 November 1977	The workforce decide to make their own money on horse racing	
"The Accident"	4 December 1977	Fenner's Fashion faces closure when an inspector is injured whilst touring the factory	
"The New Brother"	11 December 1977	A diligent new Indian employee finds himself a victim of the girls' jokes	

==== Christmas special (1977) ====
Title	Airdate	Description	Notes
"Christmas Rush"	24 December 1977	The workforce are forced to work during the Christmas Holidays. Mrs Fenner returns to Fenner's Fashion	

==== Series 5 (1978) ====
Title	Airdate	Description	Notes
"The Annual Ball"	8 September 1978	The creation of a dress for Mrs Fenner causes chaos at Fenner's Fashion	
"The Leather Line"	15 September 1978	Another argument between Paddy and Fenner could cost Fenner's Fashion their best customers	
"Stress"	22 September 1978	Fenner's attempt to secure a loan results in a heath scare	
"A Bad Patch"	29 September 1978	Fenner has lost all his customers. The Girls think of a way of making money	
"Come Back Paddy"	6 October 1978	Paddy leaves Fenner's Fashion for another firm	
"Self-Defence"	13 October 1978	Paddy attempts of a defence program have disastrous consequences	
"Fenner's Folly"	20 October 1978	The possibility of a large order prompts Fenner to think about his future	

== Missing episodes ==
Because of the BBC's wiping policy of that era, of the 36 episodes made only 20 episodes of the original BBC Television version (1961–63) still exist in the BBC archives.

Series 1 of the original BBC TV version of the show has eight episodes surviving and two episodes missing from the archive. The DVD release of Series 1 has the episodes out of broadcast order. Series 2 of the original BBC TV version of the show has 11 episodes surviving and two episodes missing from the archive, with the episodes in their correct broadcast order on the Series 2 DVD release. Only one of the 13 episodes of the third (and final) BBC TV series (1963) currently exists – "Baby Dolls", which was confirmed to have been unearthed by Philip Morris of the Television International Enterprises Archive and returned to the BBC in 2018.

== Music ==
"The Rag Trade" was the theme song to the 1977 revival of The Rag Trade, The song was written by Lynsey de Paul, but the vocals are credited to Joan Brown singing "It's the rag trade" over a quirky tune, sounding remarkably like de Paul. Indeed, some sources credit the vocal performance of the song to de Paul. The recording was arranged by John Bell and the conductor was Denis King. It was released on an album of TV themes on the DJM Records subsidiary label Weekend Records. The DVD set featuring all 22 episodes of the LWT episodes, with the theme music at the beginning and ending of every episode, was released by Network. The original version of "The Rag Trade" can be heard on de Paul's official website.

== DVD release ==
Eight of the ten surviving episodes from Series 1 (broadcast in 1961) were released on DVD by DD Home Entertainment in March 2006, although they were out of broadcast order. The 11 existing episodes of Series 2 (broadcast in 1962) were released on DVD by Simply Media 7 months later in October 2006, in their correct broadcast order.

A 4-disc set consisting of the 19 surviving episodes from the first two series of the show were later released on 23 October 2017 by Simply Media, although Series 1 episodes remained out of broadcast order.

All 22 episodes of both colour series 4 and 5 of the (1977–78) LWT version of the series, including the 1977 Christmas special, have been released on DVD by Network, under the titles "The Rag Trade: The Complete First LWT Series" and "The Rag Trade: The Complete Second LWT Series", and then all re-released under the title "The Rag Trade: The Complete LWT Series".
