= Chesney and Wolfe =

British TV comedy screenwriters

- Occupation: Television screenwriting duo
- Notable work: The Rag Trade; Meet the Wife; On the Buses; Romany Jones
- Ronald Chesney
- Birth Name: René Lucien Cadier
- Born: 4 May 1920 London, England, United Kingdom
- Died: 12 April 2018 (aged 97); Kingston upon Thames, London, England, United Kingdom
- Ronald Wolfe
- Birth Name: Harvey Ronald Wolfe-Luberoff
- Born: 8 August 1922; London, England, United Kingdom
- Died: 18 December 2011 (aged 89); London, England, United Kingdom

Chesney and Wolfe, were a British television comedy screenwriting duo consisting of Ronald Chesney (born René Lucien Cadier; 4 May 1920 – 12 April 2018) and Ronald Wolfe (born Harvey Ronald Wolfe-Luberoff; 8 August 1922 – 18 December 2011). They were best known for their sitcoms The Rag Trade (1961–1963, 1977–1978), Meet the Wife (1963–1966), On the Buses (1969–1973) and Romany Jones (1972–1975). When their partnership began in the mid-1950s, Chesney was already known to the public as a harmonica player.

== Early life ==
=== Ronald Chesney ===
Chesney, was born in London of French descent, the son of Marius, a silk trader, and Jeanne (née Basset). He left the French Lycée school in London at the age of 16, and began using his English name.

Chesney initially learned piano, but decided instead a career as a chromatic harmonica player, performing professionally from the age of 17. Touring the ABC Cinema chain, he played on BBC Radio broadcasts from 1937, the first being Palace of Varieties. Declared unfit to serve in the Second World War because of the removal of a tuberculosis-infected kidney, he taught the harmonica to troops in a BBC radio series, which ran for 42 weeks, beginning in 1940. After the war, he began to diversify into the classical repertoire.

Chesney became a well-known performer, entertaining troops, performing at the London Palladium and Royal Albert Hall, and working with Duke Ellington and Gracie Fields. He was President of the National Hohner Song Band League (later the National Harmonica League) from 1951.

=== Ronald Wolfe ===
Wolfe was born in London, a cousin of actor Warren Mitchell, and the grandson of Russian Jewish immigrants. His parents ran a kosher restaurant in Whitechapel, which served performers from the variety theatre across the road. He was educated at the Central Foundation Boys' Grammar School in Islington. For a while he was a stand-up comedian. "I came from vaudeville and music halls", he once said. During the Second World War, he was an army radio operator, and after being demobbed he worked as a radio engineer for Marconi.

In the early 1950s, he began to write for the Jewish comedian Max Bacon; after Bacon introduced him to the BBC, Wolfe contributed material for radio shows. Starlight Hour (1951), broadcast on the BBC Light Programme, was a series which featured Beryl Reid. Wolfe became Reid's regular writer, providing material for her characters, Brummie Marlene and the naughty schoolgirl, Monica. After Reid joined the cast of the radio comedy series Educating Archie, Wolfe joined the writing team for the series which Eric Sykes had created. The series featured ventriloquist Peter Brough and his dummy Archie Andrews.

== Chesney and Wolfe's projects ==
=== Early collaborations ===
Chesney's harmonica playing was featured as a musical interlude on Educating Archie; this led to his first meeting with Wolfe in 1955. They wrote the show's last four seasons, initially with another of the show's writers, Marty Feldman. A one-off special for BBC Television in 1956, entitled Here's Archie, was written by Wolfe, but still featured Chesney with his harmonica act. It also starred Irene Handl.

The first regular television work for Chesney and Wolfe, writing in partnership with Feldman, was in 1958 when ITV franchise holder Associated-Rediffusion made a television version of Educating Archie. Persuaded by Wolfe, Chesney soon gave up performing professionally, so that they could form a writing partnership. He did, however, tutor Sylvia Syms for her harmonica-playing role in the film No Trees in the Street (1959). By this time, they had also written material for Tommy Steele and Ken Dodd, including pantomimes for both. The sitcom It's A Deal (1961) turned out to be their last work for radio. It starred Sid James as a dishonest property developer, with Dennis Price as his partner, but lasted for only a single series of 13 episodes.

=== The Rag Trade ===
Around the same time, the two men created The Rag Trade (1961–63), starring Peter Jones as Harold Fenner, ungenerous head of Fenner Fashions, Miriam Karlin as the shop steward, Paddy, and Reg Varney as the foreman trying to mediate the conflict between employer and employed in a London East End sweat-shop. Sheila Hancock and Barbara Windsor were also in the cast, plus the diminutive Esma Cannon. Directed (and produced) by Dennis Main Wilson, Karlin wrote in her autobiography that Main Wilson had an "amazing capacity for picking the right people" for a cast.

Rejected by Associated-Rediffusion, who thought factory workers would not watch it, the pitch was picked up by Frank Muir and Denis Norden who were then comedy advisers for BBC Television. Unusually for the time, the series featured strong female roles, who it has been said gained the best lines, and it was a popular and critical success, being watched by more than 11 million viewers. Karlin's chain-smoking character had the catchphrase "Everybody out!" "I know all about working people and the struggles of the small businessman," Ronald Wolfe once said. "Writers who come from orthodox middle-class backgrounds can’t write The Rag Trade-type show. They just don’t know what makes the man in the street laugh." The show was turned into a stage version which had a run in London's West End at the Piccadilly Theatre in 1962.

=== Later 1960s shows ===
Chesney and Wolfe repeated their success with the BBC sitcom Meet the Wife (1964–66) starring Thora Hird and Freddie Frinton. It was originally a one-off Comedy Playhouse pilot called "The Bed" (1963). Again, this featured working-class characters and humour. Frinton's character was a plumber, while Hird's had social aspirations. It ran for five series. In 1964, for Australian television, they wrote the first six episodes of a 13-episode comedy series, Barley Charlie, concerning the inheritance by two sisters of a run-down garage with one lazy employee.

The partnership wrote The Bed-Sit Girl (1965–66) for Sheila Hancock, who played a young typist frustrated by her current life. One of the series' characters, a neighbour (played by Derek Nimmo) of Hancock's title character, carried over to a follow-up series: Sorry I'm Single (1967) starred Nimmo as a callow mature student sharing a house with three young women. Wild, Wild Women (1969), starring Barbara Windsor and Pat Coombs and set in 1902, was effectively a period-drama variation on The Rag Trade, but only one series was produced.

=== On the Buses ===
Their next series was ITV's On the Buses, which ran from 1969 to 1973, leading them to be called the Other Two Ronnies. Rejected by the BBC, it was commissioned by Frank Muir, Head of Entertainment at the then recently established London Weekend Television, who said it was "rather at the baked beans end of my menu". The series had an audience of up to 20 million, and was more popular at the time than Dad's Army.

It starred Reg Varney as bus driver Stan Butler, with Bob Grant as his bus conductor Jack Harper. Doris Hare was his Mum (originally played by Cicely Courtneidge), Michael Robbins his brother-in-law Arthur, and Anna Karen his plain sister Olive. Stephen Lewis, as bus inspector Cyril Blake, usually referred to as 'Blakey', delivered the series' catchphrases "I 'ate you, Butler" and "I'll get you for this, Butler". Both Varney and Grant's characters were womanisers. As David Stubbs wrote for The Guardian in 2008, Grant and Varney were playing "two conspicuously middle-aged men" pursuing "an endless array of improbably available 'dolly birds'".

The series, although a ratings success, was nevertheless critically derided at the time of its first broadcast. It led to three film spin-offs, which Chesney and Wolfe both co-wrote and co-produced. The first of these was more successful at the British box office than the year's James Bond film Diamonds Are Forever (1971). On the Buses' American remake, Lotsa Luck (1973–74), ran for a season on NBC. When On the Buses ended, Wolfe and Chesney followed it with Don't Drink the Water (1974–75), which starred Stephen Lewis's Blakey character abroad in Spain with his sister (played by Pat Coombs). It lasted for two series.

=== Later work ===
The ITV sitcom Romany Jones ran from 1973 to 1975, with an initial pilot in 1972, was set on a caravan site. Originally it starred Dad's Army actor James Beck (who died in 1973, after recording the second series) with Jo Rowbottom and Jonathan Cecil also appearing. It lasted four series, being the most successful in the ratings of their series after On the Buses. It led to a sequel, featuring the characters played by Arthur Mullard and Queenie Watts moving into a council house, entitled Yus, My Dear (1976). The latter series, which had comparatively low ratings, has a reputation, shared with Romany Jones, of being one of the worst-ever sitcoms.

In 1977, following the BBC's rejection of a new pilot episode, The Rag Trade was revived by LWT for the ITV network, with Peter Jones and Miriam Karlin returning; it lasted for two series. Anna Karen was "transplanted" into the cast (as Anthony Hayward expressed it in 2011) to play her Olive character from On The Buses. Karlin, however, encouraged to return to the role by a promise from Chesney and Wolfe of a more ethnically diverse cast, ultimately regretted her involvement, believing the sole black character was merely a token.

Their last two series as a comedy scriptwriting partnership were Watch This Space (BBC 1980) set in an advertising agency with Liza Goddard, Peter Blake and Christopher Biggins, and Take a Letter, Mr. Jones (Southern 1981), a role-reversal comedy created for John Inman, which also starred Rula Lenska.

An episode of 'Allo 'Allo! (1989) and Fredrikssons Fabrik – The Movie (1994) were the partnership's last scripts.

== Later life ==
From the 1980s, Wolfe taught comedy writing at London's City University in 1986 and 1988. His text book Writing Comedy first appeared in 1992. He was also a contributor to The Stage newspaper. Ronnie Wolfe – My Life in Memoirs appeared in 2010. Written 20 years earlier, it was launched at BAFTA in November 2010. Chesney was no longer a regular harmonica player in his last years; he preferred to play jazz on his grand piano at home.

Wolfe died on Sunday 18 December 2011, aged 89, three days after sustaining head injuries from a fall at a care home in London. He had married Rose Krieger in 1953; she served as his secretary and estimated that she had typed 95% of his scripts. The couple had two daughters. "He was the most incredible husband and we had 58 years of superb marriage harmony", his wife said in tribute.

Chesney died at Kingston Hospital on 12 April 2018, aged 97. He was survived by his wife Patricia, to whom he was married for 70 years, and their two children, Marianne and Michael.

== Television credits ==
- Here's Archie (1956) BBC
- Educating Archie (1958–59) Associated-Rediffusion/ITV
- The Rag Trade (1961–1963, 1977–1978) BBC, LWT/ITV
- Comedy Playhouse – "The Bed" (1963, pilot for Meet the Wife) BBC
- Meet the Wife (1964–1966) BBC
- Barley Charlie (1964) Nine Network, Australia
- The Bed-Sit Girl (1965–66) BBC
- Sorry I'm Single (1967) BBC
- According To Dora (1968–69) BBC
- Comedy Playhouse (Series 7) – "Wild, Wild Women" (1968, pilot) BBC
- Wild, Wild Women (1969, series) BBC
- On the Buses (1969–1973) LWT
- The Other Reg Varney (1970, repeated as The Reg Varney Comedy Hour in 1972) LWT
- Romany Jones (1972, pilot) Thames Television/ITV
- Romany Jones (1973–75, series) LWT/ITV
- Don't Drink the Water (1974–75) LWT/ITV
- Yus, My Dear (1976) LWT/ITV
- Comedy Special – "The Boys and Mrs B" (1977) BBC
- Watch This Space (1980) BBC
- Take a Letter, Mr. Jones (1981) Southern/ITV
- 'Allo 'Allo! (1989, episode "Down the Drain", series 5) BBC

== Film credits ==
- I've Gotta Horse (1965)
- On the Buses (1971)
- Mutiny on the Buses (1972)
- Holiday on the Buses (1973)
- Fredrikssons Fabrikk – The Movie (Norway 1994)

== Bibliography ==
- Goodwin, Cliff (2001). Sid James: A Biography. London: Virgin. ISBN 9780753546826.
- Hancock, Sheila (2004). The Two of Us: My Life with John Thaw. London: Bloomsbury. ISBN 9781408806937.
- Irwin, Mary (2016). "The Rag Trade: 'Everybody Out!' Gender, Politics and Class on the Factory Floor". In Kamm, Jürgen; Neumann, Birgit (eds.). British TV Comedies: Cultural Concepts, Contexts and Controversies. Basingstoke & New York City: Palgrave Macmillan. ISBN 9781137552952.
- Karlin, Miriam; Sargent, Jan (2007). Some Sort of Life. London: Oberon. ISBN 9781783194605.
