= On the Buses =

British TV sitcom (1969–1973)

- Title card used from series 3 to 6; the animated titles were introduced in series 2.
- Genre: Sitcom
- Created by: Ronald Chesney; Ronald Wolfe
- Written by: Ronald Chesney; Ronald Wolfe; Bob Grant; Stephen Lewis; George Layton; Jonathan Lynn
- Directed by: Stuart Allen; Howard Ross; Derrick Goodwin; Bryan Izzard
- Starring: Reg Varney; Bob Grant; Anna Karen; Cicely Courtneidge (1969); Doris Hare (1969–73); Stephen Lewis; Michael Robbins (1969–72)
- Opening theme: "Happy Harry"
- Composer: Tony Russell
- Country of origin: United Kingdom
- Original language: English
- No. of series: 7
- No. of episodes: 74 (list of episodes)

Production
- Running time: 25 minutes
- Production company: London Weekend Television

Original release
- Network: ITV
- Release: 28 February 1969 – 20 May 1973

Related
- Don't Drink the Water

On the Buses is a British television sitcom that was broadcast on ITV from 1969 to 1973. It was created by Ronald Chesney and Ronald Wolfe, who wrote most of the episodes. It spawned three spin-off feature films and a stage version. Despite the writers' previous successes with The Rag Trade and Meet the Wife with the BBC, the corporation rejected On the Buses, not seeing much comedy potential in a bus depot as a setting. The comedy partnership turned to Frank Muir, head of entertainment at London Weekend Television (LWT), who loved the idea; the show was accepted, and despite a poor critical reception became a hit with viewers.

The series is centred on the working-class life of Stan Butler and Jack Harper, who are the crew of the Number 11 bus at the Luxton and District Motor Traction Company. The action mostly takes place at the Butler home and at the bus depot. Network On Air describes the show as having a "bawdy, comic postcard humour and resolutely working-class outlook", and notes the series became "one of the most popular British comedy series of its era, if not all time."

== Episodes ==
Series	Episodes	Originally released	
Series	Episodes	First released	Last released
1	7	28 February 1969	11 April 1969
2	6	31 May 1969	5 July 1969
3	13	2 January 1970	27 March 1970
4	13	27 November 1970	21 February 1971
5	15	19 September 1971	26 December 1971
6	7	20 February 1972	2 April 1972
7	13	26 February 1973	20 May 1973

== Cast and characters ==
Character	Played by	Series						
Character	Played by	1	2	3	4	5	6	7
Stan Butler	Reg Varney	Main	Main	Main	Main	Main	Main	Main
Mabel "Mum" Butler	Cicely Courtneidge	Main						
Mabel "Mum" Butler	Doris Hare		Main	Main	Main	Main	Main	Main
Arthur Rudge	Michael Robbins	Main	Main	Main	Main	Main	Main	
Olive Rudge	Anna Karen	Main	Main	Main	Main	Main	Main	Main
Jack Harper	Bob Grant	Main	Main	Main	Main	Main	Main	Main
Inspector Cyril "Blakey" Blake	Stephen Lewis	Main	Main	Main	Main	Main	Main	Main

=== Main characters ===
The main characters of On the Buses (left to right): Arthur, Olive, Stan, Mum (Doris Hare), Jack and Blakey

- Reg Varney as Stanley "Stan" Butler – a bus driver who works for the Luxton and District Traction Company along with Jack and Blakey. He lives with his mother Mabel, sister Olive and brother-in-law Arthur. Stan frequently chats up the clippies at the bus depot and his antics often include concocting schemes to bunk off work, gain favour from women or solve predicaments caused by his family. Though he is rarely serious, has a disregard for authority and is rude to women he deems unattractive, Stan is ultimately good-natured at heart and tries to help those he cares for. While he loves his family, he frequently subjects sister Olive and brother-in-law Arthur to jokes at their expense, and is frequently irritated by his mother's traditional morals and rules. Due to his playboy attitude towards women and carefree approach to life, he is often blind or ignorant of his own issues such as his health, appearance and success. He mostly triumphs over his rival Inspector Blake, but on occasion has fallen foul of the inspector's wrath.
- Cicely Courtneidge (series 1) and Doris Hare (series 2–7 & films) as Mabel Butler ("Mum"), Stan's mother. She is a maiden in distress when it comes to money. The Butler household is forever losing money and regularly getting the electricity cut off. Mabel is frequently caught up in arguments between Arthur, Olive and Stan but manages to retain a sense of maternal order over them. She is moral, believing in the sanctity of marriage and family, as well as criticising licentious behaviour in women. Despite her strong moral compass however, she sometimes turns a blind eye to Stan's ways and near-criminal high jinks at his job.
- Anna Karen as Olive Rudge, Stan's sister. Olive is always being criticised by her husband Arthur, even though she helps her mum with household jobs and frequently helps Stan with the decorating. Olive also held jobs in the bus depot - as a clippie in the TV series and as canteen cook in the first film - both times being unsuccessful. She is always wanting "an early night" with Arthur, much to his displeasure. Anna's real-life husband Terry Duggan appeared in a series 1 episode and in the first film as "Nobby".
- Michael Robbins as Arthur Rudge, Stan's brother-in-law. Somewhat aloof and stuck-up, he frequently resists Olive's intimate advances. His hospital operation is a frequent source of ridicule from Stan and Jack. Although the nature of the procedure is never disclosed, it is implied to have been a vasectomy or a hernia. Arthur is always tampering with his motorbike, which usually falls apart. Arthur has a mother (played by Gillian Lind) and a younger sister called Linda (played by Helen Fraser) who both appeared in the episode "Boxing Day Social". In the first two series, Arthur worked in a ticket office in a train station. But in the rest of the show, he was in training to be a hospital doctor before marrying Olive.
- Bob Grant as Jack Harper, Stan's scheming, workshy conductor and best friend, who also happens to be his next-door neighbour (although throughout the series he regularly attempts to discredit Stan by underhanded means, such as innuendo, accusation or the like, and steals Stan's girlfriends on several occasions). He and Stan are always getting into trouble and getting reprimanded by Inspector Blake. Whether it is tampering with radio controls, putting "diversion" road signs in the wrong places or going on dates with the buxom clippies, they are always getting into scrapes. Jack is also the shop steward of the bus depot, and frequently abuses his position to thwart Blakey's schemes, usually with the catchphrase "As shop steward I am here to tell you.....".
- Stephen Lewis as Cyril "Blakey" Blake – the inspector at the bus depot. Whenever there is a "brilliant idea" at the bus depot, it is usually Blakey's. These are usually elaborate schemes to temper Stan's and Jack's frequent insubordination, or to entrap them in their misadventures in a bid to get them fired. However, Blakey's schemes typically backfire with hilarious consequences, and land him either in trouble with the general manager or in hospital. On occasion, Blakey sometimes scores a minor victory over Stan and Jack, outsmarting their attempts to deceive or bunk off work, but these are usually short-lived and the pair gain the upper hand in the end.

=== Recurring characters ===
- Michael Sheard as the general manager of the bus depot who is seen frequently throughout the seventh and final series. He often argues with Blakey about something that the latter has done. He was also the judge at the gardening competition in the episode "Gardening Time". Sheard also played the general manager in the Holiday On The Buses film.
- Madeleine Mills and Sandra Miller as the inspector's niece. She was played twice by Mills and twice by Miller. In her first two appearances, she and Stan are in a relationship; in the second they are engaged, but split up after a tea party at Stan's house. In her third appearance she married Bill, a bus driver at the depot. She also appeared in the episode "The New Nurse".
- Sandra Bryant as Sandra, a clippie at the bus depot. Her character is seen frequently throughout the seventh and final series. In the first episode of the seventh series, she goes on a date with Stan to the cinema, until Olive comes along too, she also appears in Holiday On The Buses.
- Terry Duggan and Norman Mitchell as Nobby – one of the bus depot's mechanics. (Duggan also made an appearance as a passenger in some episodes of the TV series, and reprised the role of Nobby in the first On The Buses film). He often assists Stan and Jack in their typical schemes and misadventures. In real-life Duggan was married to Anna Karen (Olive).

== Series production ==
A total of 74 episodes of On the Buses were broadcast over seven series. Three spin-off films were also released.

All episodes and films of On The Buses were set in the fictional town of Luxton.

At the beginning of the seventh series Arthur, who is not seen, has left Olive and they are divorced. Olive again gets a job as a clippie on the buses as they are short of money. Stan takes a job in the north of England in a car factory in the "Goodbye Stan" episode midway through the series, and the inspector takes Stan's old room as a lodger.

In addition, two five-minute Christmas specials were made by LWT as part of an All Star Comedy Carnival in 1969 and 1972, ITV's answer to the BBC's Christmas Night with the Stars programme. The 1969 edition has been lost, but the 1972 edition – featuring a goose that the cast are chasing for Christmas dinner – exists in the Thames Television archive, which is now owned by FremantleMedia.

Reg Varney undertook a PCV driving test in order to be filmed driving the bus for the exterior scenes. Stephen Lewis also performed some of his own stunt work, such as Blakey hanging off a low bridge after the bus he was on almost collides with it, and in the first film when he is trapped on Stan's bus whilst carrying out high speed skid training.

The earlier series were recorded at London Weekend Television's original studios in Wembley (later Fountain Studios). In late 1972, LWT relocated to new studios on the South Bank of the River Thames; here the outside doors to the main and secondary studios were too small to accommodate the double-decker buses used in the series. Therefore, single decker buses were used and a plywood mock-up of an upper deck was lowered from a lighting rig.

Filmed external shots were part of the series. LWT arranged with the now defunct Eastern National Omnibus Company to use its buses at Wood Green bus garage in North London. They were shown as belonging to Luxton and District. Luxton is supposed to be in Essex, and actual Essex towns including Southend-on-Sea, Basildon, Braintree and Tilbury are all mentioned. One of the bus route termini was "Cemetery Gates", for which LWT used the entrance to Lavender Hill Cemetery. A different Lavender Hill in Battersea also features in the last episode of the last series, featuring the town hall (now the Battersea Arts Centre).

The fourth series was affected by the ITV Colour Strike, with seven of the 13 episodes being made in black and white.

Characters from On The Buses appeared in two other series. A spin-off, Don't Drink the Water (1974–75), ran for 13 episodes, featuring Blake retiring to Spain with his sister Dorothy (Pat Coombs - who also played one of the female bus drivers in the first On The Buses film). Anna Karen reprised her role as Olive in LWT's revival of The Rag Trade, which ran for two series in 1977–78.

== Theme music ==
The theme music for the series, entitled "Happy Harry", was written by Tony Russell.

== Featured buses ==
The red Town & District buses were Bristol KSWs with Eastern Coach Works bodies. These were former Eastern National. Stan's and Jack's "regular" bus appeared to be VNO 857.

The green Luxton & District buses were Bristol Lodekkas with bodywork by Eastern Coach Works of Lowestoft. In reality these were Eastern National buses (in some episodes buses could be seen with Eastern National on the side), although as mentioned earlier, the later interior depot shots were in fact 'dummy' buses. Some 'dummy' buses were real single-deck buses with a wooden frame on top, such as in the Series 3 episode "Radio Control", when the bus has crashed into the bridge. The most commonly used bus in the series was AVW 399F. In later episodes the ENB symbol appears next to Luxton & District.

Stan's usual buses, AVW 399F and AEV 811F, are both still extant; one is in Lille, France, the other in Los Angeles, California.

In the first episode of series 6, former London Transport bus Leyland Titan PD2 RTL1557 (OLD 666) is featured and burnt out.

== Broadcast and repeats ==
The original series was repeated on Granada Plus in 1996 and until the channel closed in 2004, and was later repeated on UK Gold and then from 2004 onward on ITV3, where it was still seen as of May 2026. Fox Classics on the Australian Fox cable network and New Zealand's Jones channel on Sky regularly show the series. As of August 2018, the series is broadcast by Dutch 'oldies' cable channel ONS.

== Home media ==
=== Region 1 ===
Visual Entertainment released On the Buses: The Ultimate Collection, an 11-disc box set featuring the complete series on DVD on 12 September 2006.

=== Region 2 ===
Network released On the Buses: The Complete Series box set on DVD on 13 November 2006 for the first time, then again on 25 May 2008 in a new repackaged version. It has also released each series individually.

=== Region 4 ===
Beyond Home Entertainment released the entire series on DVD in seven series sets between 2 July 2007 and 8 April 2009. Between 2008 and 2009 Series 1 to Series 5 were repacked into standard DVD cases as original releases were in gatefold digipaks with a slip box. In 2010 they released The Complete Series 11-DVD box set. In 2010, the individual series were re-released through ITV Studios. Season 1 and Season 2 were released separately (previously released together) on 5 September 2012, and Seasons 4 and Season 5 on 6 February 2013; it is unknown whether remaining seasons will be issued. The complete Series was repackaged and re-released on 7 August 2013. On 21 November 2018, On The Buses: The Complete Collection was reissued and distributed by Shock Entertainment.

== Critical reception ==
Despite the popularity of On the Buses with sections of the public, TV reviewers and historians have generally held the show in lower regard. In its section on situation comedies, The Guinness Book of Classic British TV describes On the Buses as ITV's "longest running and most self-consciously unfunny series". TV reviewer Victor Lewis-Smith later criticised the then head of London Weekend Television, Frank Muir, for green-lighting the programme, which Lewis-Smith called "the wretched On the Buses". The Daily Telegraph journalist Max Davidson, discussing 1970s British comedy, listed On the Buses as one of the "unfunny sitcoms of the time", while The Guardian's David Stubbs referred to On the Buses as "a byword for 70s sitcom mediocrity".

On The Buses is sometimes used as an example of the sort of sexism that was rife in society in the late 1960s and early 1970s, occurring after the freedoms of sexual liberation, but before the rise of feminism; in particular, the derision towards one of the main female characters (Olive Rudge) for being unattractive. Some episodes of the show also featured a black character humorously referred to as Chalky, which would be construed as racist by modern standards.

== Films ==
The three spin-off films were produced by Hammer Film Productions. They are On the Buses (1971), Mutiny on the Buses (1972), and Holiday on the Buses (1973), the latter set in a holiday camp. On the Buses became Britain's top box office film of 1971.

The films were set in a different canon to the TV series. In the films, Arthur and Olive manage to have a child despite their mostly sexless marriage and Arthur's 'operation' – the exact nature of which was never explicitly revealed. Arthur's operation is mentioned in the first film, but later Olive gives birth to their baby son in the same film. The three films follow a loose story arc which shows their son (Little Arthur) growing up. Olive is pregnant with a second child at the end of the second film Mutiny on the Buses, but no mention was made of Olive's second child in the third film, Holiday on the Buses, which was set mainly in a holiday camp. In the films canon, the bus depot becomes that of The Town & District Bus Company instead of The Luxton & District Traction Company. The buses in the films are mostly red ones, with one green one (not including the Windsor Safari Park tour bus in Mutiny On The Buses).

== American adaptation ==
The format of On the Buses was sold to America, where it was remade by NBC as Lotsa Luck, starring Dom DeLuise as Stanley Belmont with Kathleen Freeman as Iris Belmont, his mum, Wynn Irwin as Arthur Swann, Beverly Sanders as Olive Swann and Jack Knight as Bummy Pfitzer, his best friend. Episodes based on the original On The Buses scripts were adapted by such American writers as Carl Reiner, Bill Persky and Sam Denoff. Inspector Blake did not have a counterpart in the American version; and, in another significant change to the storyline, Stan worked at the lost property office at the bus depot rather than being a driver. After a pilot was made, the sitcom ran for one series of 22 episodes in 1973–74. It was not a success, and has never been screened in Britain.

== In popular culture ==
Look-in, a UK children's magazine, serialised On the Buses in comic strips from August 1971 to May 1974. They were drawn by cartoonist Harry North and the TV series' often bawdy humour was diluted for a younger audience. A board game of On the Buses was released by Denys Fisher games in 1973. Harry Enfield and Paul Whitehouse did several sketches using the characters of On the Buses to lampoon the humour of the show.

Reece Shearsmith and Steve Pemberton created a fake episode titled "Hold On Tight!" for their anthology series Inside No. 9 that was seemingly based on On the Buses.

The British recording artist Morrissey used the character Blakey as the theme of his October 1990 single Oh Phoney from the Kill Uncle sessions. The song was later included on his 1990 compilation album Bona Drag.

== See also ==
British sitcom
