= Bob Grant (actor) =

English actor (1932–2003)

- Bob Grant as Jack Harper in On the Buses
- Born: Robert St Clair Grant; 14 April 1932; Hammersmith, London, England
- Died: 8 November 2003 (aged 71); Twyning, Gloucestershire, England
- Occupations: Actor; comedian; writer
- Years active: 1952–1998
- Spouses: Jean Hyett (m. 1954, divorced); Christine Sally Kemp (m. 1962, divorced); Kim Benwell (m. 1971)

Robert St Clair Grant (14 April 1932 – 8 November 2003) was an English actor and writer, best known for playing bus conductor Jack Harper in the television sitcom On the Buses, as well as its film spin-offs and stage version.

== Early life ==
Grant was born in Hammersmith, West London, on 14 April 1932, the son of Albert George Grant (1909–1985) and Florence, née Burston (1909–2001). He was educated at Aldenham School.

== Career ==
=== Early career ===
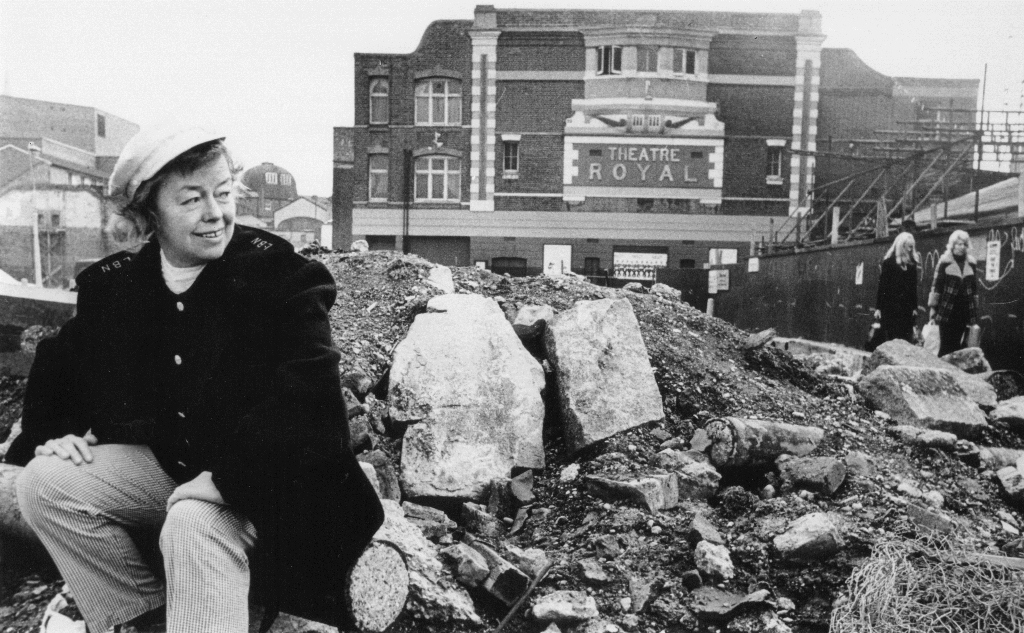
Joan Littlewood directed Grant, as Kitely, in Every Man in His Humour, at the Fourth International Season of the Theatre of the Nations Festival in 1960.

Grant trained as an actor at the Royal Academy of Dramatic Art, working in his spare time as a frozen food salesman and also (coincidentally, in view of his later career) as a bus driver. After doing national service in the Royal Artillery, he made his stage debut in 1952 as Sydney in Worm's Eye View at the Court Royal, Horsham. (Note: Anthony Hayward in Grant's obituary, and Ian Herbert in Grant's Who's who entry, both state that Grant's stage début was in Worm's Eye View at the Court Royal, Horsham, in November 1952. However, there was no advertised production of Worm's Eye View at the Court Royal for that year and it is doubtful that this was Grant's début. A production of the play was staged at the theatre from the 4 May 1953 for six days.)

Grant's first London appearance was in The Good Soldier Schweik at the Duke of York's Theatre in 1956, and he spent several years at the Theatre Royal Stratford East before getting the lead role in the musical Blitz! at the Adelphi Theatre in the West End for two years. In 1964, he appeared at the Piccadilly Theatre in Instant Marriage, a musical farce, for which he wrote the book and lyrics, with music by Laurie Holloway.

Grant had by now started to make film appearances, including Sparrows Can't Sing (1963), (Note: The screen version of a play written by his future On the Buses co-star Stephen Lewis, in which he had previously acted on stage.) and the film version of Till Death Us Do Part (1969). (Note: He appeared with Michael Robbins, another future On the Buses co-star.) He returned to the Theatre Royal, Stratford, in 1967, and starred in the satirical play Mrs Wilson's Diary as George Brown, the Foreign Secretary in Harold Wilson's Labour government; this play later transferred to the West End. After George Brown's resignation from the Government on 15 March 1968, the character of George Brown was switched with Barbara Castle, as the plot required a cabinet minister.

In January of that year, Grant appeared as The Major in a six-part radio comedy drama The 17-Jewelled Shockproof Swiss-Made Bomb, featuring Peter Coke. It was written by Roy Clarke and produced by Alan Ayckbourn. The programne was transmitted on the BBC Light Programme.

=== On the Buses ===
Grant played the bus conductor Jack Harper in the television sitcom On the Buses, which ran for 74 episodes between 1969 and 1973; he co-wrote 11 episodes and one special, with co-star Stephen Lewis (who played Blakey, the Inspector). It was an instant success with the viewers, and led to three feature films On the Buses (1971), Mutiny on the Buses (1972) and Holiday on the Buses (1973). The series was the peak of his career.

=== Later career ===
When On the Buses finished, Grant found himself heavily typecast as Jack Harper and struggled to get other parts. He toured Australia in the farce No Sex Please, We're British, and continued to appear in musicals and pantomimes. In 1975, he wrote and starred in a one-off pilot, Milk-O, alongside his On the Buses co-star Anna Karen, an attempt to reinvigorate his career by means of a similar character, a milkman who spent his time fighting off amorous housewives he was delivering to. However, this did not lead to a series, and Grant never acted for television again. In 1981, he appeared in a touring production of the once-controversial revue Oh! Calcutta!, accompanied by a chorus line of naked men and women less than half his age.

In 1980, Grant played the title role in John Arden's BBC radio adaptation of Don Quixote, with Bernard Cribbins as Sancho Panza. In 1986, he played a cockney detective inspector in The Red Telephone Box, a comedy thriller by Ken Whitmore on BBC Radio 4. On stage he later played Autolycus in Shakespeare's The Winter's Tale for the Birmingham Repertory Theatre.

In 1990, it was announced that On the Buses would be revived as a new show called Back on the Buses, and the entire cast, including Grant, Reg Varney, Stephen Lewis, Doris Hare, Michael Robbins and Anna Karen would appear on Wogan. Back on the Buses eventually fell through when funding from STV was not forthcoming. The project was to have been backed by STV's executive producer Bryan Izzard who had produced seven episodes of the series and the final spin-off film, Holiday on the Buses.

His last acting role was in Funny Money at Devonshire Park Theatre from July 1998.

== Personal life ==
In 1954, he married Jean Hyett; the marriage would later end in divorce.

In 1962, he married for the second time, to Christine Sally Kemp; they also divorced.

He was in a relationship with On the Buses guest star Gaye Brown, until he broke up with her to date (and eventually marry) Kim Benwell. When Grant married for the third time in 1971, with his On the Buses co-star Stephen Lewis as Best Man, there were huge crowds outside the register office. Consequently the couple had to abandon their hired Rolls-Royce and walk to the reception. A double-decker bus had been provided for the guests, but they had to walk as well.

=== Mental illness ===
In the 1980s, he suffered from depression, bipolar disorder and other mental health problems, because of a lack of work and his considerable debts. This eventually led to a suicide attempt. In 1987, he disappeared from his home in Leicestershire for five days; it later emerged that he had taken the ferry to Dublin intending to kill himself. "I was in a horrible state", Grant said during an interview with Pamela Armstrong after the event, "I just had to get out of the house. I left the house and thumbed a lift to Melton Mowbray, and then got a train to Birmingham New Street where I sat sobbing in a station buffet. Everyone ignored me. Normally I get asked in the street something like 'When you back on telly then?', but not this time".

Grant started to write his first note to his wife Kim, intending her to receive it after he had killed himself. "Tears streamed down my face as I wrote", he recalled. After hours of pounding the streets of Birmingham, Grant instead caught the ferry to Dublin, "It was a horrible night on that boat", he continued. "I'd been to Dublin before and it seemed such a nice place. I wanted to end it all, either by jumping in the River Liffey or ironically under a bus." Grant stayed at a guesthouse in Dublin to think things over. He called Kim, but there was no answer; she was at the time filming an appeal to find him. On the strength of the appeal, Grant eventually returned to England, where his absence had caused a small stir, which allowed him to gain a few more acting jobs.

A further long gap in employment led to another suicide attempt in 1995, this time by carbon monoxide poisoning. Grant was discovered just in time, slumped over the steering wheel of his car, which was filled with exhaust fumes, and admitted to hospital for treatment. He and Kim took a holiday to Goa in India to recover and on their return, it seemed things were finally going right again. They moved to a small cottage in Church End, Twyning, about a mile south of Twyning, near Tewkesbury in Gloucestershire with the ambition of making a fresh start. Grant lived very reclusively and neighbours would only see him when he was trimming his hedge.

== Death ==
His 'new life' did not last, as once more substantial bills continued to arrive and work did not. Grant made a third and final suicide attempt in 2003. This time he succeeded, and was found dead soon after.

== Selected filmography ==
=== Film ===
Film credits
Year	Title	Role	Notes	Ref.
1959	I'm All Right Jack	Card player	Uncredited: Four workers playing cards behind the pallets. Grant is on the left and nearest the camera. The other three card players were played by David Lodge, Keith Smith and Kenneth J. Warren.	
1960	The Criminal	Prisoner	Uncredited	
1963	Sparrows Can't Sing	Perce		
1965	Help!	Cameo	Grant's scenes were cut from the film.	
1969	Till Death Us Do Part	Man in Pub		
1971	On the Buses	Jack Harper		
1972	Mutiny on the Buses	Jack Harper		
1973	Holiday on the Buses	Jack Harper		

=== Television ===
The following is a list of television programmes in which Grant was involved.

Television appearances of Grant
Year	Title	Episode	Station	Role	Notes	Ref.
1959	Quatermass and the Pit	The Wild Hunt	BBC One	Ted (Electrical technician – uncredited)	Series 1, Episode 5	
1959	Quatermass and the Pit	Hob	BBC One	Ted (Electrical technician – uncredited)	Series 1, Episode 6. He was electrocuted while laying a power cable inside the chamber.	
1961	Sir Francis Drake	The Doughty Plot	Independent Television	Clements		
1963	No Hiding Place	Solomon Dancey's Luck	Independent Television	Alexander Mudgeon		
1964	Armchair Theatre	A Jug of Bread	Independent Television	Ben		
1964	The Plane Makers	Appointment in Brussels	Independent Television	Antique Dealer	Series 3, Episode 11	
1965	Merry-Go-Round	The Incredible Adventures of Professor Branestawm	BBC One	Professor Branestawm	Broadcast as part of the Merry-Go-Round children's education series	
1967	Softly, Softly	James McNeil, Aged 23	BBC One	Napier	Series 2, Episode 12	
1968	Z-Cars	Punch-Up: Part 1	BBC One	Ted Griffin	Series 6, Episode 157	
1968	Z-Cars	Punch-Up: Part 2	BBC One	Ted Griffin	Series 6, Episode 158	
1969	Mrs. Wilson's Diary		Independent Television	George Brown	It was scheduled originally to be broadcast on 23 November 1968. (Note: The Independent Television Authority (ITA) objected to certain scenes that characterised George Brown, the former Foreign Secretary, as a drunk. London Weekend Television refused to make the cuts requested by the ITA, but eventually backed down, and the scenes were reshot.)	
1969–1973	On the Buses		Independent Television	Jack Harper	Grant appeared in all 74 episodes and as a writer with Stephen Lewis for a number of episodes from series 5 onwards.	
1969	All Star Comedy Carnival		Independent Television	Jack Harper		
1970	Comedy Playhouse	The Jugg Brothers	BBC One	Robert Jugg	Written by Grant and Stephen Lewis. Comedy pilot for series 9 of Comedy Playhouse	
1970	The Borderers	The Quacksalver	BBC Two	William Peck	Series 2, Episode 7	
1970	This Is Your Life	Reg Varney	Independent Television	Himself	Series 10, Episode 25	
1971	This Is Your Life	Doris Hare	Independent Television	Himself	Series 12, Episode 7	
1972	All Star Comedy Carnival		Independent Television	Jack Harper	The On the Buses segment was written by Grant and Stephen Lewis.	
1975	It's a Celebrity Knockout	Craven Cottage	BBC One	Himself		
1975	Comedy Premiere	Milk-o	Independent Television	Jim Wilkins	Written by Grant and Anthony Marriott	
1987	Daytime	The price of fame: in and out of the public eye	ITV	Himself	Discussion show with Sarah Kennedy	
1990	Wogan	Interview	BBC One	Himself	Interview with the former cast of On the Buses about plans to revive the series as "Back on the Buses"	

== Publications ==
=== Plays ===
- Marriott, Anthony; Grant, Bob (1978). Darling Mr. London: a farce. London: Samuel French. ISBN 978-0-573-11113-6. OCLC 1038431648.
- Marriott, Anthony; Grant, Bob (1978). No room for love: a farce. London: Samuel French. ISBN 978-0-573-11310-9. OCLC 5379828.
- Marriott, Anthony; Grant, Bob (1991). Home is where your clothes are: a comedy in two acts. London: Samuel French. ISBN 978-0-573-01789-6. OCLC 26310819.

== See also ==
- Stephen Lewis
- Joan Littlewood
- On the Buses
- Pitlochry Festival Theatre
- Reg Varney
- Theatre Workshop
