= Michael Robbins =

English actor (1930–1992)

- Robbins as Arthur Rudge in On the Buses
- Born: Michael Anthony Robbins; 14 November 1930; Croydon, England
- Died: 11 December 1992 (aged 62); Surrey, England
- Occupation: Actor
- Years active: 1957–1992
- Notable work: On the Buses
- Spouse: Shirley Hal Dyer (m. 1960)

Michael Anthony Robbins (14 November 1930 – 11 December 1992) was an English actor best known for his role as Arthur Rudge in the television sitcom On the Buses (1969–1973) and its film spinoffs.

== Early life ==
Michael Robbins was born in Croydon, Surrey, to Percival W. Robbins (1899–1956) and Bertha May née Sindall (1900–1997). From 1939 to 1944 Robbins was a pupil at St Michael's College, a Catholic school for boys, in Hitchin, Hertfordshire. He then went on to work as a bank clerk and later became an actor after appearing in amateur dramatic performances also in Hitchin, where he and his family lived at the time.

== Career ==
Robbins made his television debut as the cockney soldier in Roll-on Bloomin' Death. Primarily a comedy actor, he is best remembered for the role of Arthur Rudge, the persistently sarcastic husband of Olive (Anna Karen), in the popular sitcom On the Buses (1969–73). Robbins and Karen provided the secondary comic storyline to Reg Varney's comedy capers at the bus depot. Robbins appeared in the first six series but left before what would become the final season because he wanted to return to theatre work. He appeared in the series film spin-offs, On the Buses, Mutiny on the Buses, and Holiday on the Buses (which came out after he had left the series in 1973).

Robbins' other comedy credits include non-recurring roles in How's Your Father, Man About the House, Oh Brother!, The Good Life, One Foot in the Grave, The New Statesman, George and Mildred, Hi-de-Hi!, You Rang, M'Lord?, and the radio series Share and Share Alike (radio series). He appeared as a rather humorously portrayed police sergeant in the TV adaptation of Brendon Chase.

As well as these comic roles, Robbins assumed various straight roles in some of the major British television shows of the 1960s and 1970s, including that of the hard-drinking old sea dog Harry Baxter in The Saint episode The People Importers. He made appearances in Minder, The Sweeney, Z-Cars, Return of the Saint, Murder Most English, Rumpole Of The Bailey, The Avengers, Dixon of Dock Green, The Bill, and the 1982 Doctor Who story The Visitation.

Robbins' film credits included The Whisperers, Up The Junction, Till Death Us Do Part, The Looking Glass War, Zeppelin, The Great Muppet Caper and Blake Edwards' films The Pink Panther Strikes Again and Victor/Victoria. He also had an extensive career as a radio actor, including a role in the soap opera Waggoners' Walk.

Robbins appeared as a councillor in EastEnders in June 1989.

== Personal life ==
Robbins was married to actress Hal Dyer (1935–2011), from 1960 until his death from prostate cancer in 1992 aged 62. Dyer died in 2011 from a brain haemorrhage.

Robbins was an indefatigable worker for charity. He was active in the Grand Order of Water Rats (being elected "Rat of the Year" in 1978) and the Catholic Stage Guild. In 1987 he received the Pro Ecclesia et Pontifice medal, a papal award, for his services. In one of his last television appearances, in A Little Bit of Heaven, he recalled his childhood visits to Norfolk and spoke of his faith and love of the Shrine of Our Lady at Walsingham.

== Partial filmography ==
=== Film ===
- Lunch Hour (1961) – Harris
- A Prize of Arms (1962) – Orford
- What a Crazy World (1963) – Percy
- Act of Murder (1964) – van driver
- The Bargee (1964) – Bargee (uncredited)
- Rattle of a Simple Man (1964) – George – Organiser
- The Whisperers (1967) – Mr. Noonan
- Up the Junction (1968) – Figgins
- Till Death Us Do Part (1968) – Pub Landlord (Fred)
- Crossplot (1969) – Garage attendant
- The Looking Glass War (1970) – Truck Driver
- All the Way Up (1970) – Taxi Driver
- Zeppelin (1971) – Cockney Sergeant
- Villain (1971) – Barzun
- On the Buses (1971) – Arthur Rudge, Stan's brother-in-law
- Mutiny on the Buses (1972) – Arthur Rudge, Stan's brother-in-law
- That's Your Funeral (1972) – 2nd Funeral Director
- No Sex Please, We're British (1973) – Car Driver
- Holiday on the Buses (1973) – Arthur Rudge, Stan's brother-in-law
- Man About the House (1974) – Second Doorman
- The Pink Panther Strikes Again (1976) – Ainsley Jarvis
- The Saint and the Brave Goose (1979) – Beeky
- The Great Muppet Caper (1981) – Security Guard
- Victor/Victoria (1982) – Manager of Victoria's Hotel
- Lost In London (1985) – Bill
- Just Ask for Diamond (1988) – The Fat Man

=== Television ===
- A Chance of Thunder (1961) – Mills
- Deadline Midnight (1961) – first man
- Edgar Wallace Mysteries, "Dead Man's Chest" (1965) – Sergeant Harris
- Gideon's Way, "Fall High, Fall Hard" (1965) – George
- On the Buses (1969–1972) – Arthur Rudge
- How's Your Father (1974–1975) - Eddie Cropper
- The Sweeney, "Big Brother" (1974) – Kevin Lee
- The Good Life, "Whose Fleas Are These?" (1976) – Mr Bulstrode
- The Fuzz (1977) – Det. Sgt. Sidney Marble
- Leave it to Charlie, "...And Harry's Just Wild About Me" (1979) – Mr. Sowerbutts
- George and Mildred, "The Last Straw" (1979) – Alf
- Minder, "All Mod Cons" (1980) – Jack McQueen
- Doctor Who, "The Visitation" (1982) – Richard Mace
- Fairly Secret Army (1984) – Sgt. Major Throttle
- Dempsey and Makepeace, "Jericho Scam" (1986) – Simmons
- Rumpole of the Bailey, "Rumpole’s Last Case" (1987) – Cyril Timson
- Strong Poison (1987) – Bill Rumm
- Hi-de-Hi! (1988) – Roger
- EastEnders (1989) – councillor
- The New Statesman
- You Rang M'Lord? (1990) – Twelvetrees Senior
- Let them Sniff Cake (1991) – Mad Eddie
- The Winjin' Pom (1991) – The Winjin' Pom
- One Foot in the Grave – "The Man in the Long Black Coat" (1991) – Mr Killick
- The Bill, "Something Personal" (1991) – Tobin
- In Sickness and in Health (1992) – rail worker
