= Stephen Lewis (actor) =

English actor and writer (1926–2015)

- Lewis as Inspector Cyril Blake in On the Buses, 1969
- Born: 17 December 1926; Poplar, London, England
- Died: 12 August 2015 (aged 88); Wanstead, London, England
- Resting place: St Patrick's Roman Catholic Cemetery, Leytonstone, London, England
- Other name: Stephen Cato
- Occupations: Actor; comedian; director; screenwriter; playwright
- Years active: c. 1958–2007

Stephen Lewis (17 December 1926 – 12 August 2015), credited early in his career as Stephen Cato, was an English actor, comedian, director, screenwriter, and playwright. He is best known for his roles as Inspector Cyril "Blakey" Blake in On the Buses, Clem "Smiler" Hemmingway in Last of the Summer Wine and Harry Lambert in Oh, Doctor Beeching!, although he also appeared in numerous stage and film roles.

== Early life ==
Lewis was born at All Saints Maternity Hospital in Poplar, London, England on 17 December 1926. He worked as a bricklayer, electrician's mate and carpenter, and also joined the Merchant Navy, before turning to acting. He was persuaded to go to a performance by the Theatre Workshop, under its director Joan Littlewood. It was common, after these performances, to invite members of the audience to meet the cast. He was invited to an audition, landed the part, and left the sea to become a member of the company.

== Career ==
=== Stage ===
Lewis made his West End theatre debut with the transfer of Brendan Behan's The Hostage in 1958. In 1960 he wrote Sparrers Can't Sing with the Theatre Workshop, which was made into the film Sparrows Can't Sing in 1963, starring Barbara Windsor, Roy Kinnear and Lewis himself, as well as his future On the Buses co-star Bob Grant. He used the surname Cato in his early stage career, but after writing Sparrows Can't Sing he was urged by his agent to use his real name.

=== Television ===
From 1969 Lewis starred in his best-remembered role as the gruff inspector Blakey in the British sitcom On the Buses, which ran for 74 episodes and spawned three films: On the Buses (1971), Mutiny on the Buses (1972), and Holiday on the Buses (1973). He co-wrote 12 episodes with fellow star Bob Grant. Lewis was made up to look much older than his actual age with heavy make-up; he was only 42 when the programme began. A spin-off series, Don't Drink the Water (1974–1975), ran for two series. This featured Blakey retiring to Spain with his sister Dorothy (played by Pat Coombs). In the 1990s, Blakey appeared regularly on Jim Davidson's version of The Generation Game on BBC One. In addition, Lewis played a coach driver with very similar characteristics to Blakey in a 2000 edition of ITV's 1970s-set sitcom The Grimleys. He also appeared in Manhunt in a rare villainous role, as a Milice in episode 2. He and Bob Grant starred in a TV show called Jugg Brothers (1970), but this never got past the pilot episode.

=== Film ===
The films in which Lewis acted included A Prize of Arms (1962), Sparrows Can't Sing (1963) (which he also wrote), Negatives (1968), Staircase (1969, with Richard Burton and Rex Harrison), Some Will, Some Won't (1969), The Magnificent Seven Deadly Sins (1971), The Last Remake of Beau Geste (1977), Personal Services, Out of Order (both 1987), and The Krays (1990). He also appeared in two British sex comedies, Adventures of a Taxi Driver (1976) and Adventures of a Plumber's Mate (1978).

=== Later television roles ===
In 1988, he took on one of his longest-running roles, playing Clem "Smiler" Hemingway in the BBC sitcom Last of the Summer Wine. The character appeared in many episodes for 17 years, until ill health forced Lewis to leave the series and retire in 2007. In 1996, Lewis played Harry Lambert, the signalman, in the BBC pilot of sitcom Oh, Doctor Beeching!, which ran to two further series. He appeared as a guest in sitcoms such as One Foot in the Grave, 2point4 Children, Father, Dear Father, London's Burning (1 episode) and The Grimleys. He also played the character of Alf, a comedy writer, in the second series of The All New Alexei Sayle Show (1995).

== Death ==
Lewis died aged 88, on 12 August 2015, in a nursing home in Wanstead, London, where his sister Connie also resided.

== Filmography ==
Year	Title	Role	Notes
1961	The Frightened City	Alf's First Thug	
1962	A Prize of Arms	Military Police Corporal	
1963	Sparrows Can't Sing	Caretaker	Also writer
1966	Kaleidoscope	Truck Driver	Uncredited
1968	Negatives	The Dealer	
1969–1973	On the Buses	Cyril "Blakey" Blake	
1969	Staircase	Jack	
1970	Some Will, Some Won't	Police Constable Arthur	
1971	The Magnificent Seven Deadly Sins	Jarvis	(segment "Wrath")
1971	On the Buses	Cyril "Blakey" Blake	
1972	Mutiny on the Buses	Cyril "Blakey" Blake	
1973	Holiday on the Buses	Cyril "Blakey" Blake	
1974–1975	Don't Drink the Water	Cyril "Blakey" Blake	
1976	Adventures of a Taxi Driver	Doorman	
1977	The Fosters	Mr Wilberforce	
1977	The Last Remake of Beau Geste	Henshaw	
1978	Questo si che è amore	Policeman	
1978	Adventures of a Plumber's Mate	Crapper	
1982	Rep	Royston Flagg	
1987	Personal Services	Mr. Dunkley	
1987	Out of Order	Bus Driver	
1988–2007	Last of the Summer Wine	Clem "Smiler" Hemmingway	
1990	One Foot in the Grave	Vince Bluett	
1990	The Krays	Policeman	
1991	2point4 Children	Driving Instructor	
1993	Inside Victor Lewis-Smith	Man in Lift	
1995	The All New Alexei Sayle Show	Alf	
1995–1997	Oh, Doctor Beeching!	Harry Lambert	
2000	London's Burning	Porter	In series 12 Episode 13.
2004	Revolver	Various characters	
