= Reg Varney =

English actor and entertainer (1916–2008)

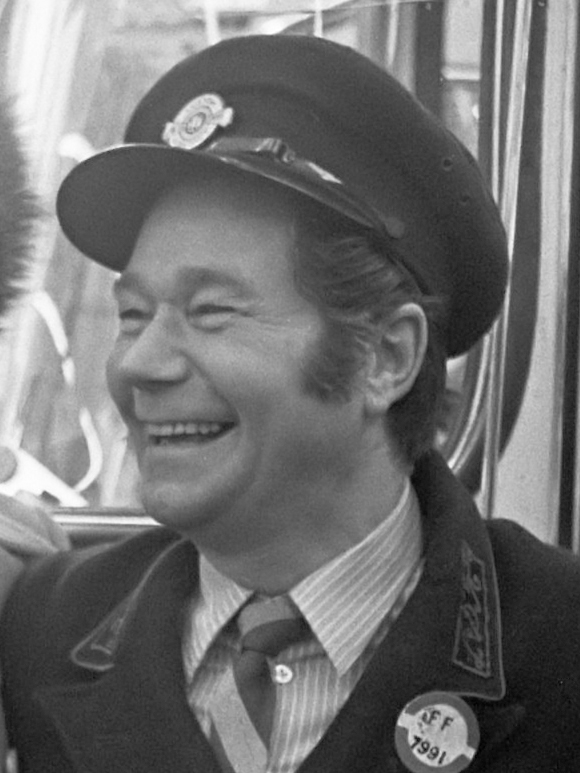
- Varney in 1972
- Born: Reginald Alfred Varney; 11 July 1916; Canning Town, Essex, England
- Died: 16 November 2008 (aged 92); Budleigh Salterton, Devon, England
- Resting place: St Peters Burial Ground, Budleigh Salterton, Devon, England
- Occupations: Actor; comedian; entertainer
- Years active: 1930–1995
- Television: On the Buses
- Spouse: Lilian Flavell (m. 1939; died 2002)
- Children: 1

Reginald Alfred Varney (11 July 1916 – 16 November 2008) was an English actor, entertainer and comedian and sometimes worked as a pianist.

Varney is best remembered for having played the lead role of bus driver Stan Butler in the LWT sitcom On the Buses (1969–1973) and its three spin-off feature films. Having performed as a music hall entertainer, Varney first came to national recognition as factory foreman Reg Turner in the BBC sitcom The Rag Trade (1961–1963). He appeared in further sitcoms including Beggar My Neighbour (1966–1968) and On the Buses stardom facilitated overseas cabaret tours.

== Early life ==
Varney was born in Canning Town, Essex (but now part of the London Borough of Newham), to Sidney Thomas Varney and his wife Annie (née Needham). His father worked in a rubber factory in Silvertown and he was one of five children who grew up in 27 Addington Road, Canning Town. He was educated at the nearby Star Lane Primary School in West Ham and after leaving school at 14, he worked as a messenger boy and a page boy at the Regent Palace Hotel.

Varney took piano lessons as a child and was good enough to find employment as a part-time piano player. His first paid engagement was at Plumstead Radical Club in Woolwich, for which he was paid eight shillings and sixpence. He also played in working men's clubs, pubs and ABC cinemas with his friend George Shears and later sang with big bands of the time. He and his mother decided that show business was the career for him, and he gave up his day jobs. Varney became a solo pianist at the Windmill Theatre in May 1938. In late 1939, he married Lilian Emma Flavell (1915–2002) at East Ham.

During the Second World War, Varney joined the Royal Engineers, but continued his performing career as an army entertainer, touring in the Far East for a time. After being demobilised in the late 1940s, he starred on stage in a comic revue entitled Gaytime, with Benny Hill as his partner in a double act. He then became an all-round entertainer, working his way around the music halls.

== Career ==
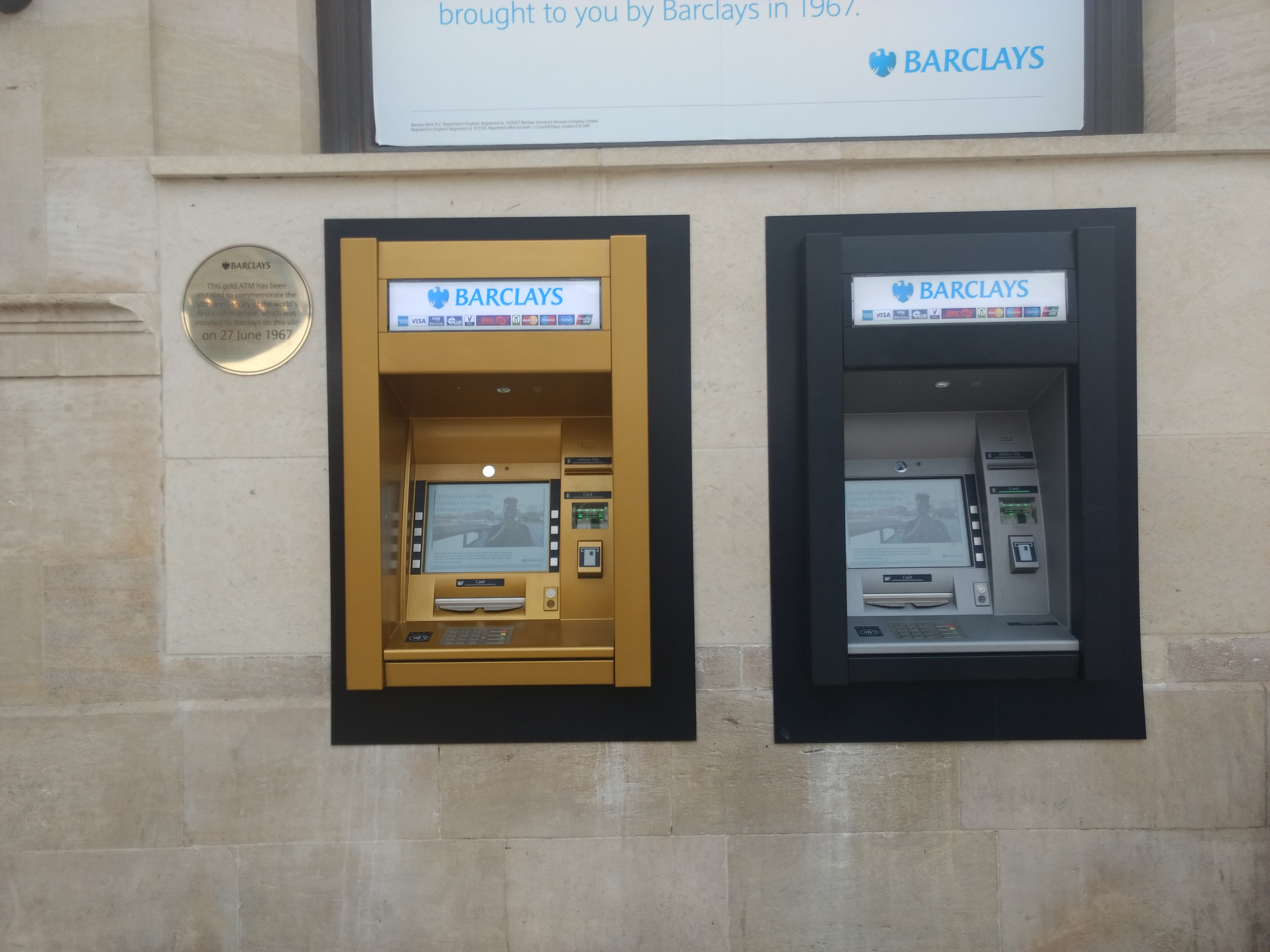
Gold cash dispensing machine (ATM) marking the site of Varney's historic withdrawal

Varney had made only a small number of film and TV appearances prior to being cast in the role of long-suffering factory foreman Reg Turner in the BBC television sitcom The Rag Trade (1961–1963), which made him a household name. He was aware that he was the only performer without West End acting experience and worked hard to make up for it. Slightly later, he starred in a children's show for BBC TV called The Valiant Varneys (1964–65), performing multiple characters in front of a live audience. After that followed another comedy role in Beggar My Neighbour (1966–1968); this also starred Pat Coombs, June Whitfield and Peter Jones. Pat Coombs played the wife of Varney's character. Varney featured in The Great St Trinian's Train Robbery (1966) with Frankie Howerd, Dora Bryan and George Cole.

The world's first voucher-based cash dispensing machine (ATM) was installed at the Enfield Town branch of Barclays Bank. Varney was living in Enfield at the time and for publicity purposes he was photographed making the first withdrawal from the machine on Tuesday 27 June 1967.

Varney's most successful lead role was in the LWT sitcom On the Buses (1969–1973) as bus driver Stan Butler. Varney took considerable lengths to prepare for the role, even attempting to gain a public service vehicle licence so that he could be filmed driving on the open road. However, Varney was not insured so LWT had to employ professional drivers for these scenes. Three spin-off films were made — On the Buses (1971), Mutiny on the Buses (1972) and Holiday on the Buses (1973). Varney was 52 when the first series was recorded, although his character Stan, who lived with his mother and often tried to attract young women, was implied to be aged around 35. Varney was only 11 years younger than Doris Hare, the main actress who played Stan's mother, and 20 years older than Anna Karen who played his sister.

Varney left the series midway through its last season, hoping to move on to films and other projects. Ultimately, he only appeared in one further non-Buses film, The Best Pair of Legs in the Business (1973), and two television series, both made by ATV for the ITV network: an eponymously titled sketch show (1973–74) and another sitcom, Down the 'Gate (1975–76), which was set in Billingsgate Fish Market. However neither series replicated his success with On the Buses, and after Down the Gate was dropped after 12 episodes, Varney did not star in another television series. LWT revived The Rag Trade in 1977 but Varney did not reprise his role, though Anna Karen did play Olive.

He later worked as an entertainer on cruise ships and toured Australia with his one-man show. He told an interviewer, "Whatever I did after On the Buses, nobody wanted to know about it. But I can't knock the programme because it brought me offers to do concert tours in Australia, New Zealand and Canada."

At the height of his fame he was a subject of the television programme This Is Your Life on 20 May 1970 when he was surprised by Eamonn Andrews, making further appearances in programmes featuring Doris Hare, Douglas Bader, June Whitfield and Anthony Newley.

Varney released several LP albums during his career.

== Retirement ==
Varney had a heart attack in 1965, and in 1981 he suffered a more serious one. He then contracted a severe viral infection, which for three years made working difficult for him. In 1989, he suffered a stroke, which left him with an uneven heartbeat. Subsequently, he divided his time between his home in a small village (Stoke Fleming) near Dartmouth and a villa in Malta.

Varney moved to Devon in the late 1980s and lived alone after his wife died in East Devon in 2002.

In his retirement years, Varney painted local landscapes in oil, with many to professional standard; some of his works were exhibited in London.

== Death ==
Varney died at a nursing home in Budleigh Salterton, Devon, on 16 November 2008, following a chest infection. He was 92.

In 2016, 100 years after Varney was born, an exhibition called "Before the Buses" was commissioned by his only child, his daughter Jeanne.

== Filmography ==
=== Film ===
Year	Title	Role	Type
1952	Miss Robin Hood	Dennis	Feature film
1965	Joey Boy	Rabbit Malone	Feature film
1966	The Great St. Trinian's Train Robbery	Gilbert	Feature film
1971	Too Close For Comfort (short)	The motorist	Public Information Film for the Central Office of Information
1971	On the Buses	Stan Butler	Feature film
1972	Mutiny on the Buses	Stan Butler	Feature film
1972	Go for a Take a.k.a. Double Take	Wilfred Stone	Feature film
1973	The Best Pair of Legs in the Business	Sherry Sheridan	Feature film
1973	Holiday on the Buses	Stan Butler	Feature film

=== Television ===
Year	Title	Role	Type
1947	Variety	Performer	Series (BBC)
1948	The Boltons Review	Performer	Variety special (BBC)
1948	Crock Of Gold	Harry Pickering	Movie (BBC)
1953	Showcase	Performer	Series (BBC)
1954	Stars at Blackpool	Performer	Series (BBC)
1955	Easter Spree	Performer	Variety special (BBC)
1956	Here's to the Next Time	Performer	Series (BBC)
1956	It's Magic	Performer	Series (BBC)
1958	The Saturday Show	Performer	Series (BBC)
1960	The Good Old Days	Performer	Series (BBC)
1961–1963	The Rag Trade	Reg Turner	Series (BBC)
1961	Puss in Boots	Jolly the Jester	Movie (BBC)
1962	It's a Square World	Performer	Series (BBC)
1963	Dick Whittington	Capt. Reginald Fitzwarren	Movie (BBC)
1966	Ninety Years On	Performer	Variety special (BBC)
1964, 1966	Juke Box Jury (two episodes)	Self	Series (BBC)
1966	Emergency Ward 10, Episodes 1.880 and 1.882	Harry Binns	Series (ATV)
1966	Comedy Playhouse, "Beggar My Neighbour" (pilot)	Harry Butt	Play (BBC)
1967–1968	Beggar My Neighbour	Harry Butt	Series (BBC)
1964–1965	The Valiant Varneys	Various characters	Children's series (BBC)
1966	The Good Old Days	Performer	Series (BBC)
1966	David Nixon's Comedy Bandbox	Performer	Series (ABC)
1967	Hooray for Laughter (pilot)	Performer	Sketch show (ABC)
1968	Humpty Dumpty	Simple Simon	Play (BBC)
1968	The Wakey Wakey Tavern	Performer	Series (ABC)
1968	Lulu's Back in Town, Episode 5	Performer	Series (BBC)
1968	ITV Playhouse, "The Best Pair of Legs in the Business"	Sherry Sheridan	Play (ITV)
1969–1973	On the Buses	Stan Butler	Series (LWT)
1969	The Rovers, "The Odyssey of Reginald Peck"	Reginald Peck	Series (0-10 Network, Australia)
1968	The Rose and Crown	Performer	Series (Air Media, Australia)
1969	All Star Comedy Carnival, On the Buses segment	Stan Butler	Special (ITV)
1970	The Other Reg Varney a.k.a. The Reg Varney Comedy Hour	Self, performer	Special (LWT)
1970	Holiday Startime Special	Performer	Variety special (LWT)
1970	This is Your Life, Series 10 Episode 5	Subject of show	Series (Thames)
1972	The Reg Varney Revue	Self, performer	Series (LWT)
1973–1974	Reg Varney	Self, performer	Series (ATV)
1973	Whose Baby?	Self, guest	Series (Thames)
1974	Look Who's Talking	Self, interviewee	Series (Border TV)
1974	Looks Familiar	Self, guest	Series (Thames)
1975–1976	Down the 'Gate	Reg Furnell	Series (ATV)
1976	Summer Night Out	Self, performer	Variety special (ATV)
1977	Tell Me Another	Self, guest	Series (Southern TV)
1978	Capriccio!	Self, performer	Series (Australian Broadcasting Commission)
1979	The Plank	Window cleaner	Movie (Thames)
1980	The Mike Walsh Show	Self, guest	Series (Nine Network Australia)
1980	Night of One Hundred Stars	Self, performer	Variety special (LWT)
1985	Super Troupers	Self, guest	Series (Tyne-Tees)
1990	Wogan	Self, guest	Series (BBC)
1990	This Morning	Self, guest	Series (ITV)
1991	Tonight at 8.30, "Red Peppers"	Bert Bentley	Play (BBC)
1995	Paul Merton's Life of Comedy, "Marital Bliss"	Bingo caller	Series (BBC)
1996	Noel's Telly Years, 1969	Self, guest	Series (BBC)
1998	Heroes of Comedy, "Benny Hill"	Self, guest	Series (Thames)
2001	Biography, "Benny Hill"	Self, guest	Series (ITN)
2003	Living Famously, "Benny Hill"	Self, guest	Series (BBC)

== Discography ==
This list is partially sourced from discogs.

Year	Title	Format	Label
1962	The Rag Trade (TV cast, spoken word)	LP	Parlophone, PMC 1188
1968	Jingling Rag b/w Reg's Rag	7" single	CBS, 3742
1972	This Is Reg Varney On The 88's At Abbey Road	LP	Columbia, SCX 6518
1973	Best Pair Of Legs In The Business b/w Come On And Tickle My Fancy	7" single	Columbia, DB 8977
1973	Reg's Party – Reg Varney Plays And Sings	LP	EMI, OU 2029
1976	A Variety Of Varney (reissued in 1985 as Reg Varney Orchestra Conducted By Harry Robinson – A Variety Of Varney, Flash Backs, FBLP 8100)	LP	Pye, PKL 5544
1998	The Very Best Of On the Buses (TV cast, spoken word)	Cassette	MCI Spoken Word, GAGDMC 063
