= Doris Hare =

Welsh actress, comedian, singer, and dancer (1905–2000)

Doris Hare MBE
- Born: Doris Breamer Hare; 1 March 1905; Bargoed, Wales
- Died: 30 May 2000 (aged 95); Northwood, Middlesex, England
- Occupations: Actress; comedian; singer; dancer
- Years active: 1908–1995
- Spouse: John Roberts (m. 1941; div. 1973)
- Children: 2

Doris Breamer Hare (1 March 1905 – 30 May 2000) was a Welsh actress, comedian, singer, and dancer best known for portraying "Mum" Mabel Butler in the British sitcom On the Buses and its film spin-offs, after replacing the original actress Cicely Courtneidge.

== Early life ==
Hare was born in Bargoed, Glamorgan. Her parents had a portable theatre in South Wales and it seemed inevitable that she would become a part of it, making her debut at the age of three in Queen's Evidence and appearing in juvenile troupes all over Britain as a child, before going solo as 'Little Doris Hare', appearing in music hall, variety, cabaret, revues and pantomimes. One of five, her brother, Bertie Hare and her sisters, Betty Hare and Winifred Breamer, were also actors and performers.

== Career ==
In 1930, the actress toured in The Show's the Thing, taking the part previously performed by Gracie Fields. In 1932, she appeared in the West End in Noël Coward's show Words and Music, alongside John Mills. In 1936, she made her Broadway debut in Night Must Fall. During World War II, she joined Evelyn Laye to put on a revue for the troops and compered Shipmates Ashore on the BBC Forces Programme for the Merchant Navy. She was subsequently appointed Member of the Order of the British Empire (MBE) in the 1946 Birthday Honours "for services to the Merchant Navy".

In 1958, she created the role of Grannie Tooke in the original production of Sandy Wilson's musical version of Valmouth at the Lyric Hammersmith, which transferred to the West End. She also performed on the recording of this production made by Pye Records in 1959, where she duetted with Cleo Laine, who was standing in for Bertice Reading. In 1982, the musical was revived at the Chichester Festival Theatre and Hare, Bertice Reading, Fenella Fielding and Marcia Ashton all reprised the roles they had played in the original production.

In 1963, she joined the Royal Shakespeare Company and in 1965 she joined the National Theatre Company at the Old Vic. She acted in plays by Shakespeare, Shaw, Pinero, and Pinter.

She was offered the role of Ena Sharples in the serial Coronation Street in 1960, but she turned it down and it was given to Violet Carson. Hare did however play a smaller role in the series in 1968–69 as Alice Pickens, who was due to marry Albert Tatlock, but the wedding never took place.

That same year Hare came to national attention in the role of Mabel Butler in On the Buses, taking over the part from Cicely Courtneidge in the second series of the ITV comedy. The series ran until 1973 and spawned three spin-off films On the Buses (1971), Mutiny on the Buses (1972) and Holiday on the Buses (1973) in which Hare reprised her small-screen role. The cast also performed a stage version of the series in Vancouver, British Columbia, Canada, in 1988.

In 1974, Hare spent a year in the West End farce No Sex Please, We're British and made her final stage appearance, aged 87, at the London Palladium alongside Sir John Mills in a tribute show to Evelyn Laye.

Hare received a Variety Club of Great Britain Special Award for her contributions to showbusiness in 1982.

== Death ==
Hare died on 30 May 2000, aged 95, at Denville Hall, in Northwood, London.

== Filmography ==
| Year | Title | Role | Notes |
|---|---|---|---|
| 1935 | Night Mail | | Uncredited |
| 1935 | Jubilee Window | | Uncredited |
| 1935 | Opening Night | | |
| 1938 | Luck of the Navy | Mrs. Maybridge | |
| 1939 | Discoveries | Bella Brown | |
| 1939 | She Couldn't Say No | Amelia Reeves | |
| 1948 | It's Hard to Be Good | Minor Role | Uncredited |
| 1948 | Here Come the Huggetts | Mrs. Fisher | |
| 1949 | The History of Mr. Polly | May Pant | |
| 1950 | Dance Hall | Blonde | |
| 1953 | Thought to Kill | Agnes | |
| 1954 | Double Exposure | WPC | |
| 1955 | Tiger by the Tail | Nurse Brady, hospital property clerk | |
| 1955 | No Smoking | Customer | |
| 1957 | Strangers' Meeting | Nellie | |
| 1958 | Another Time, Another Place | Mrs. Bunker | |
| 1960 | The League of Gentlemen | Molly Weaver | |
| 1964 | A Place to Go | Lil Flint | |
| 1964 | Esther Waters | Mrs. Randall | 1 episode |
| 1969–1973 | On the Buses | Mabel "Mum" Butler | 67 episodes |
| 1971 | On the Buses | Mabel "Mum" Butler | |
| 1972 | Mutiny on the Buses | Mabel "Mum" Butler | |
| 1973 | Holiday on the Buses | Mabel "Mum" Butler | |
| 1975 | Confessions of a Pop Performer | Mrs. Lea | |
| 1976 | Confessions of a Driving Instructor | Mrs. Lea | |
| 1977 | Confessions from a Holiday Camp | Mrs. Lea | |
| 1980 | Why Didn't They Ask Evans? | Rose Pratt | TV movie |
| 1986 | Never the Twain | | |
| 1990 | Nuns on the Run | Sister Mary of the Sacred Heart | |
| 1994 | Second Best | Mrs. Hawkins | (final film role) |
