= Terry Duggan =

British actor (1932–2008)

- Born: Terence A. Duggan; 15 April 1932; Hoxton, London, England
- Died: 1 May 2008 (aged 76); London, England
- Occupations: Actor, comedian
- Years active: 1966–2000
- Spouses: Pat Lyons (m. 1956; div. 1964) Anna Karen (m. 1967)
- Children: 1

Terence A. Duggan (15 April 1932 – 1 May 2008) was a British comedian and actor who had a successful career in cabaret and variety, and played numerous character roles on television.

== Early life ==
Duggan was born in Hoxton, London. From the 1960s through the 1980s, he appeared on such television series as Are You Being Served?, The Bill, Bob Martin, Only Fools and Horses, Please Sir! and Randall and Hopkirk (Deceased). He also performed pantomime, frequently teaming with his wife, the actress Anna Karen. He also appeared in different roles with her on six occasions in the ITV sitcom On the Buses, as well as in the spin-off movie On the Buses (1971).

He was also a stand-up comedian who was noted for his drunk sketches in which he portrayed an inebriated man, a concept earlier popularised by Freddie Frinton and Jimmy James. Besides practising theatrical performance from childhood, he learned acrobatics which led to film stuntman roles. Duggan was also a member of the entertainers' charity The Grand Order of Water Rats.

== Personal life and death ==
Duggan died on 1 May 2008, aged 76, following a long illness.

== Filmography ==
=== Film ===
Year	Title	Role	Notes
1967	Poor Cow	2nd Prisoner	
1967	The Mini-Affair	1st Witness	
1968	Touch of Leather	Pete	
1969	The Nine Ages of Nakedness	The Policeman	Segment "The Theatre"
1969	A Nice Girl Like Me	Radio Cab Driver	Uncredited
1970	Clegg	3rd Torpedo	
1970	Performance	Pully	Uncredited
1970	The Horror of Frankenstein	First Bandit	
1971	On the Buses	Nobby	
1971	Family Life	Unknown	
1976	Schizo	Editor	
1977	What's Up Nurse!	Old Salt	
1979	Murder by Decree	Danny	
1991	Riff-Raff	Boss in Office	
1996	Beautiful Thing	Kevin	
1999	Weak at Denise	Hostile model flyer	

=== Television ===
Year	Title	Role	Notes
1961	Knight Errant Limited	Horace Mendoza	Episode: "The Pocket Atlas"
1967	Adam Adamant Lives!	Villain (uncredited)	Episode: "The Tunnel of Death"
1967	The Informer	Book Reader	Episode: "Let Sleeping Dogs Lie"
1967	The Wednesday Play	2nd Prisoner Jean the Undertaker	2 episodes
1968	Doctor Who	I E Guard (uncredited)	2 episodes
1969	The Newcomers	Tompkins	2 episodes
1969	Wink to Me Only	2nd Man	Episode: "The Lost Chord"
1969	The Gold Robbers	Bailey	Episode: "The Cover Plan"
1969	Randall and Hopkirk (Deceased)	Jackson	Episode: "The House on the Haunted Hill"
1969	Please Sir!	Harry	Episode: "Mixed Doubles"
1969	Rembrandt	Rembrandt's brother	Television film
1970	Manhunt	Verdon	Episode: "One More River"
1971	An Apple a Day	Unknown	Television film
1971	The Fenn Street Gang	Barman	2 episodes
1971	The Basil Brush Show	Unknown	Episode: "Basil in Pantoland"
1969–1972	On the Buses	Various	5 episodes
1973	Justice	Robinson	Episode: "One for the Road"
1973	Sykes	Bus Driver	Episode: "Uniform"
1972–1974	Dixon of Dock Green	Various	4 episodes
1974	The Prince of Denmark	Delivery Man	Episode: #1.2
1976	A Place to Hide	Bruno Valenta	5 episodes
1976	Yus, My Dear	George	2 episodes
1977	Are You Being Served?	The Red Indian Father	Episode: "A Change Is as Good as a Rest"
1977	The Fosters	Belligerent Man	Episode: "Home and Away"
1977	Mr. Big	Thug	Episode: "Vote for Rocksburgh"
1978	The Mike Reid Show	Unknown	Episode: #1.5
1978	Return of the Saint	Rex	Episode: "Tower Bridge Is Falling Down"
1979	Play for Today	Caretaker	Episode: "Billy"
1979	Mind Your Language	Man in Park	Episode: "Guilty or Not Guilty"
1982	Father Charlie	Man in car	Episode: "Miracles Take a Little Longer"
1982	Only Fools and Horses	Council cleansing lorry driver	Episode: "Ashes to Ashes"
1983	Potter	2nd Motorist	Episode: #3.3
1983	Just Good Friends	the Workman	Episode: "Fatherly Advice"
1984	Dream Stuffing	Charlie	Episode: #1.8
1992	The Camomile Lawn	Taximan	Episode: #1.1
1991–1992	The Bill	Caretaker Park Attendant	2 episodes
1994	Class Act	Fred	Episode: #1.1
1995	Poirot	Butcher	Episode: "Hickory Dickory Dock"
1995	London's Burning	Roy	Episode: #8.4
2000	Bob Martin	Duke	Episode: "The X-Files"
