= Dickie Davies =

British television presenter (1928–2023)

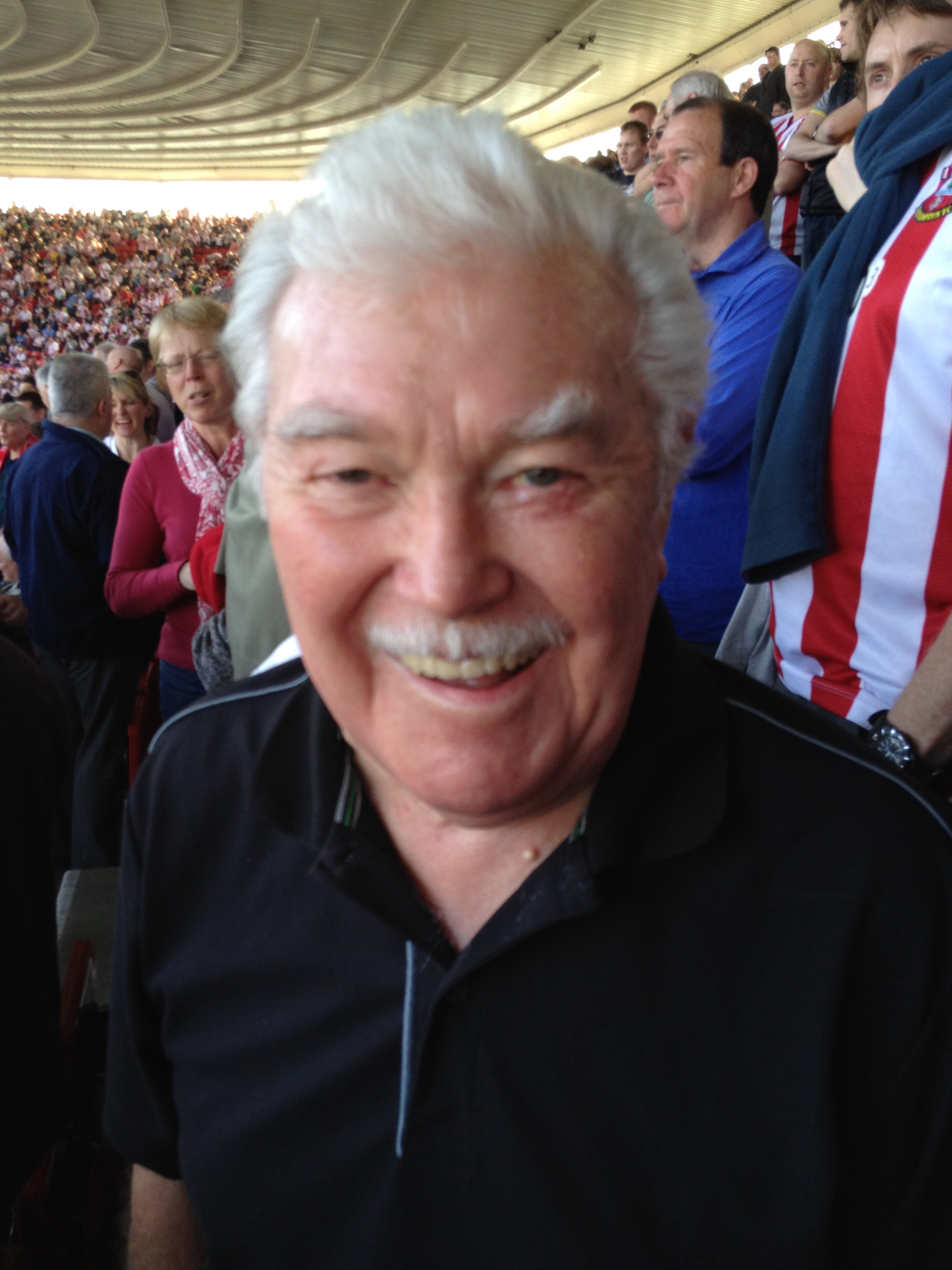
- Davies in 2012
- Born: Richard John Davies; 30 April 1928; Wallasey, Cheshire, England
- Died: 19 February 2023 (aged 94)
- Occupation: Television presenter
- Known for: World of Sport
- Spouse: Liz Hastings (m. 1962)
- Children: 2

Richard John Davies (30 April 1928 – 19 February 2023) was a British television sports presenter who anchored World of Sport from 1968 until 1985.

== Early life ==
Davies attended Oldershaw Grammar School in Wallasey after passing his eleven-plus; he then did National Service in the Royal Air Force, and worked as a purser on the RMS Queen Mary and RMS Queen Elizabeth ocean liners.

== Career ==
His first job in broadcasting was as an announcer for Southern Television. In the early stages of his career, Davies was known by his full name, Richard Davies, but changed to Dickie Davies at the suggestion of his ITV Sport colleague Jimmy Hill. Davies began work on World of Sport (initially called Wide World of Sports) in 1965 as an understudy to Eamonn Andrews, who was paid £40,000 by ITV to present it (about £825,250 at 2022 prices)—taking over the role of presenter in 1968 when Andrews left the show.

After World of Sport ended in 1985, Davies stayed with ITV, presenting boxing, darts, and snooker, as well as playing a part in their coverage of the 1988 Seoul Olympics. He left ITV Sport in August 1989.

After leaving ITV, Davies joined the original incarnation of Eurosport, which was then owned by Sky, and the European Broadcasting Union. He fronted their snooker coverage, including the one-off 1991 Mita World Masters. He presented sports bulletins from his home for Classic FM in its early days as its inaugural sports editor.

In 1995, Davies suffered a stroke, which forced him to give up his work on Classic FM. He eventually made a good recovery, although it was a year or two before his speech fully returned to normal. In the late 1990s, he fronted Dickie Davies' Sporting Heroes.

== Personal life and death ==
Davies married Liz Hastings, a vision mixer at Southern Television, in 1962. They had twin sons.

Davies died on 19 February 2023, aged 94.

== In popular culture ==
Davies is mentioned in the song "Dickie Davies Eyes" by Half Man Half Biscuit.

Davies made a cameo appearance at a racetrack in an episode of Budgie from 1972 ("The Outside Man"), and in a series 3 episode of Mind Your Language ("Guilty or Not Guilty").
