= A Fate Worse Than Death =

A Fate Worse Than Death may refer to:

- "A Fate Worse Than Death" (Mind Your Language), a 1978 television episode
- "A Fate Worse Than Death" (Forever Knight), a 1994 television episode
