= List of The Gentle Touch episodes =

The following is a list of episodes of The Gentle Touch, an ITV crime drama broadcast between 1980 and 1984, starring Jill Gascoine. A total of five series were produced over the course of the series run. All five series have since been released on DVD.

== Series overview ==
series
Series	Episodes	Originally released	
Series	Episodes	First released	Last released
1	7	11 April 1980	23 May 1980
2	10	5 September 1980	7 November 1980
3	13	6 November 1981	5 February 1982
4	13	22 October 1982	28 January 1983
5	13	1 September 1984	24 November 1984

== Episode list ==
=== Series 1 (1980) ===
No. overall	No. in series	Title	Directed by	Written by	Original release date	Viewers (millions)
1	1	"Killers"	Tony Wharmby	Brian Finch	11 April 1980	N/A
The episode starts with Maggie Forbes, who has recently been promoted to Detective Inspector, waking her husband Ray, who is a police constable, to be told that he is on nights, but as he is now awake, he gets dressed. They argue as he had become disillusioned with being a police officer and is considering leaving the force, but they make up before Maggie leaves for work. Her husband pops out and witnesses some robbers who shoot him, and he dies. After the funeral Maggie asks to go back to work but her boss tells her that she remains on compassionate leave until he says so, at home she gets a phone call from an informant called Eskimo about her husband's shooting.
2	2	"Recoil"	Christopher Hodson	Brian Finch	18 April 1980	N/A
Maggie is still off work on compassionate leave but she gets another call from her informant Eskimo, she gets her bosses permission to see what information he has and he passes on a possible lead on the gun used to kill her husband. Maggie passes the information to her boss and also verbally hands in her resignation and is told that he needs it in writing. Maggie goes to see the wife of one of the suspects and gives her contact details to the woman, later the suspect's wife comes to Maggie with the murder weapon. The episode ends with Maggie tearing up her letter of resignation.
3	3	"Help"	David Askey	Roger Marshall	25 April 1980	N/A
A young girl is arrested for trying to proposition a plain clothes police officer, and it is discovered to be a cry for attention following her parents divorce. Meanwhile Maggie's son Stephen gives in to peer pressure, drinking in a pub and being caught shoplifting.
4	4	"Shock"	Tony Wharmby	Roger Marshall	2 May 1980	N/A
Maggie is assigned to investigate the death of a woman discovered in a flat which is used as a love nest, it is discovered that her husband used to use the flat 5 years before whilst having an affair. It turns out to be an accidental electrocution due to faulty wiring on a lamp, the woman had been seeing her son's room mate who ran when he discovered her body.
5	5	"Blade"	Christopher Hodson	Roger Marshall	9 May 1980	N/A
A young gay man is knifed to death on the London Underground. Maggie investigates the crime and she finds herself annoyed with a fellow officer Detective Inspector Croft and his bigoted views. Maggie meets a Doctor Thorne who had been seeing the deceased and agrees to keep his secret from his wife, however Croft maliciously goes to Mrs Thorne and tells her that her husband was being blackmailed by the deceased gay man causing her to leave her husband. The murderer turns out to be one of the deceased's boyfriends and was a crime of passion.
6	6	"Rogue"	David Askey	Pat Hooker	16 May 1980	N/A
A woman is drunk in a restaurant and smashes a bottle of champagne causing her to be arrested, she had been let down by a man called Harry. Maggie remembers a previous case where a woman committed suicide and Harry was the cause. Things take a twist when Harry comes to the police station and Maggie accepts his invitation to dinner. The drunk woman later tries to blackmail Harry to marry her and when he refuses she reports him to the police for fraud. Harry comes to the police station to say good bye to Maggie and to give her the £10,000 Mrs Sanderson had given him.
7	7	"Melody"	Paul Annett	Terence Feely	23 May 1980	N/A
A young prostitute, Melody, is found brutally murdered and suspicion falls on the pimp, Jeremy Miller, the other girls are not willing to speak out against him. Meanwhile the murdered woman's room mate Ruby has run off, she if found and tells Maggie about a man who used to visit and bring a plant, Maggie realizes that the girl was murdered by her Father, he tells Maggie that his daughter had told him that she never wanted to see him again and that was the reason she had to die. At Melody's funeral Maggie realizes that she had been duped, it was the Mother who killed her and the Father had covered for his wife.

=== Series 2 (1980) ===
No. overall	No. in series	Title	Directed by	Written by	Original release date	Viewers (millions)
8	1	"Something Blue"	John Reardon	Tony Hoare	5 September 1980	N/A
Maggie is investigating a group of shoplifters and manages to apprehend them, meanwhile at home Maggie tidies up Steve's room and finds pornographic mags and tries to discuss it with him and later hears him on the phone with a friend who is asking him round to watch a pornographic video, Steve declines the invitation but later Maggie rings him and as he does not pick up the phone she thinks that he has gone to watch the video and goes to his friends house and confiscates the video tape. The friends mother rings Maggie's boss and reports her threatening legal action, her boss tells Maggie to go and apologise, Maggie does visit but does not apologies she puts the woman in her place.
9	2	"Decoy"	John Reardon	Terence Feely	12 September 1980	N/A
A woman is found in the streets crying with her mouth taped and hands tied, she has been raped and beaten. Maggie thinks that it is a serial rapist nicknames The Frog. It is discovered that the victims all look like Maggie so she goes undercover as a barmaid, to try and draw the rapist out, after her first night Maggie is safe but the other barmaid Diane is beaten up but her screams alert the police so she is not raped. On the second night Maggie gets in her car and the rapist is in the back seat with a knife, he takes her to a disused warehouse, where they fight she rips off his mask and the rapist is the local reporter.
10	3	"Break-in"	Tony Wharmby	Terence Feely	19 September 1980	N/A
Maggie investigates a burglary at the offices of a prosecuting solicitor. In addition an old lady came in to say that an antique dealer conned her, he brought an item from her and sold it for far more, Maggie explained that this was not actually a crime but she gets the money back for her. Whilst out Maggie gets a call that her son Steve has had an accident at school and injured his head, he is not seriously hurt. Whilst in the hospital waiting room Maggie chats to a woman who is crying and she tells her that her daughter has a tumor and that her only option is an operation in America which will cost thousands of pounds, her husband works in a solicitors office; the one which was burgled. Maggie know that he must be the thief but does not want to arrest him as it will mean that his daughter dies. In the end she arrests him.
11	4	"Menaces"	Paul Annett	Roger Marshall	26 September 1980	N/A
A man Ivor Stocker and woman are being spied on, they get back to his car which has been broken into and his case stolen. The case contained some topless pictures of his partner. He later receives a blackmail threat, Maggie investigates, the girlfriend works as a hostess in a club and is at first suspected as having some involvement. It turns out that Stocker's daughter was behind the blackmail to break him and his girlfriend up, he says that he will withdraw the charges but is old that if he does the Police will still prosecute. The daughter wins though as they do break up.
12	5	"Hammer"	Tony Wharmby	Tony Parker	3 October 1980	N/A
A woman is dressed as a Nun collecting money, a man stops and goes to hand her some money, she snatches his wallet and beats him up. Maggie investigates as there is soon a spree of men being robbed and beaten up. The woman has just robbed a car showroom at gunpoint and is waiting for a tube, a vicar approaches her things escalate and she pushes him onto the tube track and shoots him. Maggie traces the woman who kills herself before she can be arrested.
13	6	"Chance"	David Askey	Pat Hooker	10 October 1980	N/A
Maggie spends a frustrating day at the law courts, she had been expecting to get back to the station early to go on a raid but missed it. She sat in on another officers case, a boy delivered a washing machine and the old woman said that she gave him the money but he said she never so he was being charged with theft. Maggie has a niggling doubt about the case and the boy is found guilty and given a suspended sentence, in the pub after the case Maggie's Dad joins them and sees the old lady who he calls Old Bertha, he laughs about her trick for getting items delivered for cash on delivery and then never giving the cash, the episode ends with Maggie taking her Dad to the station to take a statement.
14	7	"Loyalties"	James Gatward	Tony Parker	17 October 1980	N/A
Maggie investigates when the wife of a wealthy business man is threatened by a masked man with a knife and the husband taken at gun point. The wife Mrs Berrisford rings to speak to DI Croft and when he tries to return the call the phone is off the hook so he & Maggie go to the home. Mr Berrisford has been kidnapped
15	8	"Maggie's Luck"	Nic Phillips	David Crane	24 October 1980	N/A
Maggie and Steve both find themselves in love, but find themselves asking if they are with the right person.
16	9	"Shame"	Peter Moffatt	Roger Marshall	31 October 1980	N/A
Maggie investigates when a young boy is savagely beaten, but refuses to name his attacker.
17	10	"The Ring"	Paul Annett	Neil Rudyard	7 November 1980	N/A
Maggie embarks on an affair with Dave Connolly, who gives her a Victorian ring.

=== Series 3 (1981–1982) ===
No. overall	No. in series	Title	Directed by	Written by	Original release date	Viewers (millions)
18	1	"Gifts"	Christopher Hodson	Terence Feely	6 November 1981	N/A
Maggie is intrigued when she starts to receive anonymous gifts in the post.
19	2	"Doubt"	Paul Annett	Anthony Biggam	13 November 1981	N/A
Maggie and Jimmy take a severe beating during a robbery.
20	3	"The Hit"	Nic Phillips	Terence Feely	20 November 1981	N/A
Maggie discovers that she has a marksman with a high-powered rifle loose on her patch.
21	4	"Scapegoat"	John Reardon	Roger Marshall	27 November 1981	N/A
Maggie investigates when a Jewish home is vandalised.
22	5	"Knife"	Christopher Baker	Ray Jenkins	4 December 1981	N/A
Maggie goes on the trail of a dangerous young escapee from a remand centre.
23	6	"Protection"	Carol Wiseman	Roger Marshall	11 December 1981	N/A
Maggie investigates a protection racket.
24	7	"Paint it Black"	Nic Phillips	Kenneth Ware	18 December 1981	N/A
A café proprietor is murdered and Maggie is on the case.
25	8	"Affray"	Christopher Baker	James Doran	1 January 1982	N/A
A WPC is in hospital after some youths have started a riot.
26	9	"Black Fox, White Vixen"	Nic Phillips	Jeremy Burnham	8 January 1982	N/A
Maggie investigates when a famous television actress receives death threats.
27	10	"One of Those Days"	Nic Phillips	Neil Rudyard	15 January 1982	N/A
Maggie deals with a drunken bank robber.
28	11	"Vigil"	Peter Cregeen	Tony Parker	22 January 1982	N/A
A New WPC arrives at Seven Dials.
29	12	"Damage"	Carol Wiseman	P.J. Hammond	29 January 1982	N/A
Maggie's progress on a case is stalled by a personal crisis.
30	13	"Solution"	Carol Wiseman	P.J. Hammond	5 February 1982	N/A
Maggie must consider her attitude towards euthanasia when investigating a case.

=== Series 4 (1982–1983) ===
No. overall	No. in series	Title	Directed by	Written by	Original release date	Viewers (millions)
31	1	"Right of Entry"	John Reardon	Neil Rudyard	22 October 1982	N/A
A dead burglar and a case of paranoia add up to a difficult situation for Maggie.
32	2	"Be Lucky Uncle"	Gerry Mill	Geoff McQueen	29 October 1982	N/A
Maggie tries to track down a missing informant.
33	3	"Cause and Effect"	Nic Phillips	Guy James	5 November 1982	N/A
Steve highlights his plan to join the police force.
34	4	"Auctions"	Gerald Blake	Chris Barlas	12 November 1982	N/A
Maggie investigates dodgy dealings in the world of fine art.
35	5	"Dany"	Gerald Blake	Ray Jenkins	19 November 1982	N/A
Maggie tries to win the trust of a beautiful French student to find an important witness who is on the run from the German police and an international network of pornographers.
36	6	"Victims"	Christopher Hodson	P.J. Hammond	26 November 1982	N/A
DS Barratt falls for a mugging victim.
37	7	"The Meat Rack"	Gerald Blake	Roger Marshall	3 December 1982	N/A
Maggie goes undercover as a prostitute to catch the man responsible for a series of knife attacks on women.
38	8	"Joker"	Nic Phillips	Ray Jenkins	10 December 1982	N/A
Maggie investigates when a fellow detective tries to frame an old villain for a jewellery theft.
39	9	"Tough, Mrs. Rudge"	Nic Phillips	Anthony Couch	17 December 1982	N/A
Maggie sets out to nail a gang of teenagers who have been terrorising local pensioners.
40	10	"Private Views"	John Davies	Tony Parker	7 January 1983	N/A
Maggie questions an informant who has information about a gang of thieves. Steve is concerned when a friend of his decides to quit the police college.
41	11	"Pressures"	Nic Phillips	Kenneth Ware	14 January 1983	N/A
Russell begins to suffer from severe stress when faced with a bloody multiple murder.
42	12	"Weekend"	John Davies	P.J. Hammond	21 January 1983	N/A
Phillips and Barratt investigate a bizarre marriage.
43	13	"Who's Afraid of Josie Tate?"	Gerry Mill	Neil Rudyard	28 January 1983	N/A
When a loyal wife becomes determined to help her jailed husband get justice, Maggie is forced to review the evidence.

=== Series 5 (1984) ===
No. overall	No. in series	Title	Directed by	Written by	Original release date	Viewers (millions)
44	1	"Finders, Keepers"	Gerry Mill	Neil Rudyard	1 September 1984	N/A
Maggie returns to Seven Dials as her colleagues investigate a criminal gang.
45	2	"Losers, Weepers"	Gerry Mill	Neil Rudyard	8 September 1984	N/A
Maggie and her colleagues are on the trail of forged bank notes that have fallen into the wrong hands.
46	3	"Do It Yourself"	Bill Turner	Guy James	15 September 1984	N/A
Maggie investigates a case of vigilante justice on a housing estate.
47	4	"The Conference"	Gerry Mill	Tony Hoare	22 September 1984	N/A
The Seven Dials team attend a police seminar about thefts from London hotels.
48	5	"The Good, the Bad and the Rest"	Gerald Blake	Anthony Couch	29 September 1984	N/A
Maggie tries to help when Steve learns of criminal activity at his college.
49	6	"Mad Dog"	Peter Cregeen	Terence Feely	6 October 1984	N/A
A sick dog released from a laboratory by animal rights campaigners and a children's birthday party add up to a traumatic situation for Maggie.
50	7	"Wise Child"	Gerald Blake	Guy James	13 October 1984	N/A
Maggie investigates a con artist.
51	8	"Appearances Can Be Deceptive"	Gerald Blake	Neil Rudyard	20 October 1984	N/A
Maggie thinks that a woman who has killed her abusive husband obviously acted in self-defence, until disturbing new facts emerge.
52	9	"Secrets"	Jonathan Wright-Miller	P.J. Hammond	27 October 1984	N/A
Maggie investigates a woman who harbours an unpleasant secret.
53	10	"Fox and Hounds"	John Reardon	Tony Hoare	3 November 1984	N/A
Maggie is on the case when an old man is mugged and dies from his injuries.
54	11	"Cure"	Gerry Mill	P.J. Hammond	10 November 1984	N/A
Maggie and Jake pose as a couple requiring the services of a faith healer.
55	12	"A Woman's Word"	Gerald Blake	Simon Masters	17 November 1984	N/A
Maggie struggles with keeping her word to an informer.
56	13	"Exit Laughing"	Gerry Mill	Neil Rudyard	24 November 1984	N/A
A minor civil servant is found dead in exotic circumstances, and Maggie tries to protect his widow from publicity.
