= Terence Feely =

British screenwriter and author (1928–2000)

- Born: Terence John Feely; 20 July 1928; Liverpool, England
- Died: 13 August 2000 (aged 72); Lambeth, London, England
- Education: Liverpool Jesuit College
- Occupations: Screenwriter, author
- Spouse: Elizabeth Adams (m. 1953)
- Writing career
- Notable works: The Gentle Touch (TV series); C.A.T.S. Eyes (TV series)

Terence John Feely (20 July 1928 – 13 August 2000) was a British screenwriter, playwright and author. His work spanned five decades and included creating the ITV police drama series The Gentle Touch (1980–84) and its spin-off C.A.T.S. Eyes (1985–87). His theater play script titled “Who Killed Santa Claus” was published by French in 1971.

== Life and career ==
Feely was born into a middle-class Roman Catholic family of Irish descent in Liverpool. After leaving school, he entered Liverpool's Jesuit College where he studied English and psychology.

Upon completion of his university studies, he decided to go into journalism, and got a job with a small local newspaper in Middlesbrough. However, he quickly outgrew the publication, and moved to London where he secured a position in the faster-paced world of Fleet Street, joining the editorial staff of the Sunday Graphic. Around this time he began to write submissions for film scripts; film director Alfred Hitchcock purchased the rights to one of his scripts in 1955, entitled Heartbeat.

Feely ventured into television in 1959, writing several episodes of the police detective series No Hiding Place. Following this, in 1961 he wrote two episodes for the first series of The Avengers. He then moved on to other popular shows of the time, including The Saint and Thunderbirds.

In the mid-1960s he became story editor for Armchair Theatre and Mystery and Imagination, produced by ABC (later by Thames Television). Feely was also instrumental in bringing James Mitchell's Callan to the small screen, for which he is credited as associate producer.

He joined the British subsidiary of Paramount Pictures in 1967, and was partly responsible for ensuring the production of If.... (1968), directed by Lindsay Anderson. Following this, Feely went on to become a co-director of Everyman Films (with Patrick McGoohan and David Tomblin). The company's principal production was allegorical/science-fiction series The Prisoner (1967–68), for which Feely also wrote two episodes.

In the 1970s he worked on shows such as The Persuaders!, Arthur of the Britons, The Protectors, UFO, Space: 1999, Thriller, Within These Walls, and The New Avengers. He also adapted the Henry James novel Affairs of the Heart for television in 1974.

In the late 1970s and early 1980s, he also wrote episodes for the BBC detective series Shoestring and Bergerac, as well as episodes of The Dick Francis Thriller: The Racing Game for ITV.

However, the series for which Feely is perhaps best remembered is the ITV police drama The Gentle Touch, which he created and for which he wrote several scripts. The series was a ratings hit, running for five seasons from 1980 to 1984, and was the first British police series with a female lead character (Det. Inspector Maggie Forbes, played by Jill Gascoine).

In 1985, Feely created the Gentle Touch spin-off series C.A.T.S. Eyes, about a team of female private investigators who covertly work for the British Home Office, which ran until 1987. Also in the 1980s, he co-wrote the screen adaptation of Judith Krantz's novel Mistral's Daughter, which was produced as a US television mini-series in 1984, as well as adapting two of Barbara Cartland's novels for television: A Hazard of Hearts in 1987, and The Lady and the Highwayman in 1989.

Aside from his work as a screenwriter, Feely also penned several novels including Number 10: Private Lives of Six Prime Ministers, which also became an acclaimed drama series in 1983. One of his last works, Limelight, was awarded New York's Book of the Year Prize.

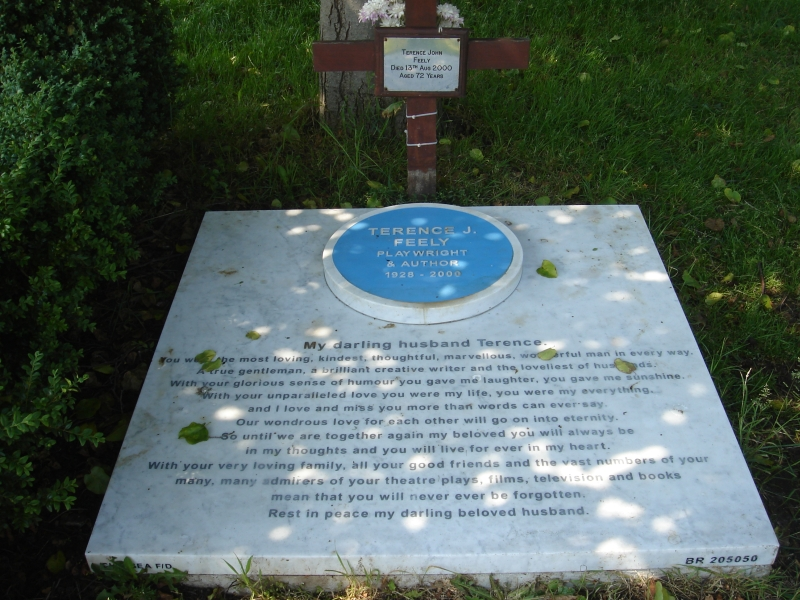
Funerary monument, Brompton Cemetery, London

== Death ==
Feely died on 13 August 2000, aged 72.
