= Nudist Memories =

1961 British naturist film by Arnold Louis Miller

- Opning titles
- Directed by: Arnold Louis Miller
- Produced by: Stanley Long
- Starring: Anna Karen
- Narrated by: Jill Gascoine
- Cinematography: Stanley Long
- Production company: Searchlight
- Distributed by: New Realm
- Release date: March 1961
- Running time: 27 mins
- Country: United Kingdom
- Language: English
- Budget: under £1,000

Nudist Memories is a 1961 British naturist short film directed by Arnold Louis Miller and starring Anna Karen in her screen debut. It was inspired by the success of Nudist Paradise (1959) and was a success at the box office.

== Cast ==
- Jill Gascoine as narrator
- Anna Karen

== Reception ==
Kine Weekly wrote: "Here we have an innocuous Eastman Color featurette giving an unadorned account of four young women's experiences at a nudist camp. It calls for little acting ability, the commentary lacks literary merit, and its 'shots' showing the girls playing, swimming and tête-à-tête in the 'altogether' fail to excite for the simple reason that the feminine form has remained unchanged since the Garden of Eden. There is, however, no limit to male curiosity and gullibility, and the film's titillating title and obvious exploitation angles guarantee it some commercial success. Gimmick offering, expressly made for industrial halls, film clubs and export."

== See also ==
- Nudity in film
