= Brian Gwaspari =

British actor (born 1948)

Brian Gwaspari (born 1948) is a British actor who made frequent guest star roles throughout the 1970s and 1980s.

He also starred in two police drama series, Specials and The Gentle Touch, appeared in The Professionals and starred in the two-part series Trial and Retribution.

== Filmography ==
| Year | Title | Role | Notes |
|---|---|---|---|
| 1977 | A Bridge Too Far | U.S. Engineer | |
| 1977 | The Spy Who Loved Me | Tanker Crewman | Uncredited |
| 1978 | Sweeney 2 | White | |
| 1989 | Spirit | Tony | |
| 1994 | Hercule Poirot's Christmas | Harry Lee | |
