= Don Houghton =

British screenwriter and producer (1930–1991)

- Born: Donald Herbert Houghton; 2 February 1930; Paris, France
- Died: 2 July 1991 (aged 61); Naples, Collier County, Florida, U.S.
- Occupations: Television and film screenwriter and producer
- Spouse(s): Judith Briggs (m. 1953; div. 19??) (1 child); Pik-Sen Lim (m. 1968; div. 198?) (1 child) Carole Ann Jenkins (m. 1991)
- Children: 2
- Writing career
- Period: 1951–1985
- Genres: Drama, adventure, science fiction

Donald Herbert Houghton (2 February 1930 – 2 July 1991) was a British television and film screenwriter and producer.

== Career ==
Born in Paris to Scottish parents, Houghton started writing for radio in 1951 before moving into film and television in 1958. Houghton lived and worked in Australia for a number of years, where his credits included The Astronauts (1960). In the 1970s, he was a primary writer for Hammer Films. His screenplays included Christopher Lee's final films as Dracula for the studio, Dracula A.D. 1972 (1972) and The Satanic Rites of Dracula (1973), as well as The Legend of the 7 Golden Vampires and Shatter (both 1974).

Houghton's television work included two Doctor Who serials, Inferno (1970) and The Mind of Evil (1971), the fifth Sapphire & Steel television story (known informally as Dr McDee Must Die) co-written with Anthony Read, Emergency Ward 10, Crossroads, Ace of Wands, New Scotland Yard, The Professionals, and two episodes of C.A.T.S. Eyes (1985). He served as the executive story editor for the series Hammer House of Mystery and Suspense (1984) and wrote one of the scripts.

Houghton created and wrote for the soap opera Take the High Road (1980). He also wrote three novels, Column of Thieves, Blood Brigade, and Take the High Road: Summer's Gloaming.

== Personal life ==
Whilst living in Australia, Houghton married Judith Briggs on 21 March 1953 when she came out to join him from Britain, not having seen him since he left England in June 1951. They had a son, Christopher.

Houghton married actress Pik-Sen Lim in Penang in 1968. They divorced sometime in the mid-to-late 1980s. Their daughter Sara Houghton is also an actress.

Spending many years travelling between Great Britain and the United States, Houghton decided to settle in Naples, Florida. He spent his last three and a half years there, being hospitalised in his final year with leukaemia. On 21 March 1991, Houghton married for the third time to Carole Ann Jenkins. They were together for the next three months until his death at their Berkshire Village home.

== Writing credits ==
Production	Notes	Broadcaster
Emergency Ward 10	24 episodes (1965–1966)	ITV
Ace of Wands	"Now You See It, Now You Don't" (1970)	ITV
The Flaxton Boys	13 episodes (1969–1970)	ITV
Doctor Who	Inferno (1970); The Mind of Evil (1971)	BBC1
New Scotland Yard	6 episodes (1972–1973)	ITV
Dracula A.D. 1972	Feature film (1972)	N/A
The Satanic Rites of Dracula	Feature film (1973)	N/A
Shatter	Feature film (1974)	N/A
The Legend of the 7 Golden Vampires	Feature film (1974)	N/A
The Doombolt Chase	6 episodes (1978)	HTV
The Professionals	"A Stirring of Dust" (1978); "Backtrack" (1979)	ITV
Take the High Road	"Episode #1.1" (1980); "Episode #1.4" (1980)	ITV; Scottish Television
Sapphire & Steel	"Doctor McDee Must Die" (co-written with Anthony Read, 1981)	ITV
Hammer House of Mystery and Suspense	"Black Carrion" (1984)	ITV
C.A.T.S. Eyes	"Frightmare" (1985)	ITV

== Bibliography ==
- Elder, Michael (1990). Ten Years of Take the High Road. London: Boxtree. ISBN 978-1-85283-109-7.
- Houghton, Don (1982). Take the High Road. Edinburgh: Mainstream. ISBN 978-0-906391-34-1.
