= C.A.T.S. Eyes =

British television series

- Genre: Detective fiction
- Created by: Terence Feely
- Written by: Various
- Directed by: Various
- Starring: Jill Gascoine; Leslie Ash; Rosalyn Landor; Tracy Louise Ward; Don Warrington
- Composers: John Kongos; Barbara Thompson
- Country of origin: United Kingdom
- Original language: English
- No. of series: 3
- No. of episodes: 30

Production
- Executive producer: Rex Firkin
- Producers: Raymond Menmuir; Dickie Bamber; Frank Cox
- Running time: 60 minutes (w/advertisements); 90 minutes (pilot episode)
- Production company: Television South

Original release
- Network: ITV
- Release: 12 April 1985 – 6 June 1987

Related
- The Gentle Touch

C.A.T.S. Eyes is a British television series made by TVS for ITV between 1985 and 1987. The series was a spin-off from The Gentle Touch, and saw Jill Gascoine reprise her role as Maggie Forbes, portrayed as having left the police force to join an all-female private detective agency called "Eyes", based in Kent, that is a front for a Home Office team called C.A.T.S. (Covert Activities Thames Section). The first series of C.A.T.S. Eyes was shown on Friday nights in 1985, before moving to a Saturday night slot for the second and third series. The series was a ratings success, regularly in the top twenty most-watched programmes each week of broadcast.

== Synopsis ==
The C.A.T.S. Eyes team consisted of former police officer Maggie Forbes, refined Oxford graduate Pru Standfast, the leader of the unit, and streetwise computer expert Frederica "Fred" Smith. Nigel Beaumont was the "man from the ministry" overseeing their activities. For the second series onwards, the Eyes detective agency front had been dropped; Pru was replaced by the similarly upper-class but more frivolous Tessa "Tess" Robinson, and Maggie was elevated to team leader.

The only other character from The Gentle Touch to make an appearance in the series was Maggie's love interest, DI Mike Turnbull (Bernard Holley), who appeared in the second episode of the first series, "The Black Magic Man", to help her with a case. Although they had still been a couple at the end of The Gentle Touch, it was implied in C.A.T.S. Eyes that since that time they had ended their relationship but were still good friends. However, their relationship was left somewhat ambiguous and unresolved. In the first episode, "Goodbye Jenny Wren", Maggie refers to her son, Steve Forbes, as having "taken off to Australia". She said that if he had not done so, she would not have volunteered to join the organisation. An ongoing reference throughout the series was whenever Maggie was addressed as "Miss", she would correct it sharply to "Mrs" - referring to her being widowed during the first episode of The Gentle Touch.

== Cast ==
- Jill Gascoine as Maggie Forbes — a former police officer, and leader of the unit following Pru's departure
- Leslie Ash as Frederica 'Fred' Smith — a streetwise computer expert
- Rosalyn Landor as Pru Standfast — The leader of the unit, and a refined Oxford graduate (series 1)
- Tracy Louise Ward as Tessa 'Tess' Robinson — a new recruit to the unit following Pru's departure and Maggie's promotion (series 2—3)
- Don Warrington as Nigel Beaumont — a ministry officer who oversees the work of the unit

== Production ==
The series was filmed in the then-closed Chatham Dockyard, as well as locations in Medway and Maidstone. All filming was done on location, and post-production editing was performed at the TVS Television Centre in Maidstone. The cars used by the regular cast in the series were loaned by the Ford Motor Company. In the first series, Pru drove a 1985 Ford Escort 1.6i Mark III Cabriolet, which was also featured at the end of the first series title sequence. Fred had a 1984 Fiesta XR2 Mark II, and Maggie used 1985 Escort 1.6 Mark III. In the second series, Fred and Tessa drove 1986 white and Azure blue Ford Escort RS Turbos respectively, with the latter being the only one produced in that colour, whilst Maggie now had a 1986 Ford Sierra Mark I. Similar-looking 1987 models of the vehicles were also used in the third series.

== Availability ==
There has been no domestic commercial release of the series on any format, due to ongoing rights issues. After the production company, TVS, dropped out of the ITV network in 1992, it underwent a number of takeovers. During these years much of the original production paperwork and sales documentation was lost, meaning that the distribution rights to the series could not be determined. The same problem affects the majority of the TVS programme archive. However, a VHS video containing the episodes "Goodbye Jenny Wren", "Frightmare" and "The Double Dutch Deal" was released in Germany in 1987. The theme music from the first series by John Kongos was also released as a single in 1985, with a vocal version on the B-side sung by Louise Burton.

== Episodes ==
=== Series 1 (1985) ===
No. overall	No. in series	Title	Directed by	Written by	Original release date
1	1	"Goodbye Jenny Wren"	William Brayne	Terence Feely	12 April 1985
Maggie arrives to join the new unit on the day that Jenny, the third member, is killed while investigating a Russian trawler anchored in the estuary. Fred avenges Jenny's death in a cat-and-mouse game with the Russians. 90-minute pilot episode.
2	2	"The Black Magic Man"	Ben Ringham Terry	Ray Jenkins	19 April 1985
A cat burglar breaks into a Special Branch 'safe house', where two illegal female immigrants are being held for questioning. He helps one of the women to escape and Maggie, on the trail of the thief, has to track them both down.
3	3	"With Vinegar and Brown Paper"	Robert Fuest	Ray Jenkins	26 April 1985
A death on the motorway leads Maggie to a man on the run, in fear of his life, and to a plot involving forged bearer bonds.
4	4	"Under Plain Cover"	William Brayne	Jeremy Burnham	3 May 1985
A man's body is found floating in the river. Pru, investigating the mysterious death, finds that an official "block" has been put on the case. Despite this, she exposes a secret deal to build a new CIA listening post in London, and obtains justice for some defrauded investors in exchange for remaining silent about the deal.
5	5	"Something Nasty Down Below"	John Frankau	Don Houghton	10 May 1985
An elderly woman tells 'Eyes' she has just seen her husband, who was supposed to have perished when a submarine sank nearly forty years ago. Maggie's investigation reveals that the submarine was carrying gold and that the crew mutinied, killing the officers and disappearing with the loot. The murderers, now in their seventies, are willing to kill again to protect themselves.
6	6	"Cross My Palm with Silver"	Robert Fuest	Jeremy Burnham	17 May 1985
A clairvoyant asks Pru to find the location of a "vision" - a place where she is convinced she is going to die. Pru discovers that several other dangerous individuals are also searching for it, and that there is a real pot of gold at the end of the rainbow.
7	7	"Frightmare"	James Hill	Don Houghton	24 May 1985
Fred is in the office at night, guarding a valuable jewel for a rich client. Keeping her company is her latest 'date' - an attractive young man who works for the client. The jewel turns out to be a red herring, and before the night is over, Fred begins to doubt her sanity.
8	8	"The Double Dutch Deal"	Ian Toynton	Martin Worth	31 May 1985
Fred, acting as 'best man' at a friend's registry office wedding, stumbles on a marriage racket run by an unscrupulous organisation for Asian girls wanting EC citizenship. She falls for a Dutch boy used by the organisation, and is devastated when the investigation ends in his murder.
9	9	"My Father Knew Lloyd Mbotu"	William Brayne	Terence Feely	7 June 1985
A hit man is sent from a newly independent African country to kill Pru's father, who had incurred the enmity of the President whilst serving in the British army there. The retired General refuses protection and Pru is sent to guard him. Her father thus learns for the first time of her real job. Meanwhile, Maggie, acting for an insurance company, exposes a chair-ridden accident victim as a fraud.
10	10	"Love Byte"	James Hill	Ben Steed	14 June 1985
A self-made entrepreneur asks 'EYES' to follow an ex-con with whom his young daughter has become involved. Fred unmasks a blackmail sideline run by the entrepreneur's second in command, based on client's personal information fed into the organisation's central computer.
11	11	"Fingers"	Robert Fuest	Anthony Skene	21 June 1985
Pru is asked to investigate the theft of an old Debussy manuscript from an exclusive piano emporium. The thief turns out to be an attractive young music buff - a member of a family of thieves who are not all as harmless as he is. With Osmund Bullock as Sam, Phyllida Law as Jessica Truscott, T. P. McKenna as Billie Truscott, Michael Thomas as Dev Truscott, and Patrick Marley as Mr Pope.
12	12	"Blue for Danger"	Tom Clegg	Jeremy Burnham	28 June 1985
When Mrs. Driscoll asks the 'EYES' operatives to follow her husband, it seems a perfectly straight forward assignment. It turns out to be the most perilous case they have ever handled, leading Maggie into deep waters, where a ruthless and terrifying adversary lurks.

=== Series 2 (1986) ===
No. overall	No. in series	Title	Directed by	Written by	Original release date
13	1	"One Away"	Dennis Abey	Paul Wheeler	5 April 1986
Edward Stone, a Soviet spy serving a life sentence in a top security jail, makes a daredevil escape by posing as an army officer in a jeep. Beth, Stone's illegitimate daughter, is kidnapped by Stone's accomplices - she is unaware of her father's identity. Awaiting his escape to Russia, Stone insists on phoning his estranged wife to arrange a meeting. Tension mounts as Maggie's life is endangered, Stone tries to effect his escape to Russia and persuade Beth to accompany him, and a Home Office contact, O'Donahue's. true allegiance is revealed.
14	2	"Powerline"	Ian Sharp	Terence Feely	12 April 1986
When undercover agent Shirley is killed in some lonely woodland, Fred and Tessa investigate posing as 'travellers' and join a band of nomadic religious freaks camping rough on Lord Leydon's estate. Tessa goes to Manor House to visit the impoverished James Leydon who already suspects her of working with the 'thought police'. A 'friend' of Jamie's, Barbara Dalchley, turns out to be in league with Sergei, a Russian defector, and Seth, one of the 'travellers' whose mission is to take pictures of nuclear missile bases. A security patrol around the estate rescue Fred and Tessa when their camper van is sabotaged, and the episode ends with Tessa involved in a shoot-out.
15	3	"Hit List"	Raymond Menmuir	Gerry O'Hara	19 April 1986
When an Arab prince and a group of foreign associates with Mafia connections are gunned down on a country estate, the 'EYES' team uncover a drug racket fronted by an international casino consortium. The Triads take exception to the Mafia trying to take a slice of their action and innocent and guilty alike fall by the wayside.
16	4	"Good As New"	Carol Wiseman	Paul Wheeler	26 April 1986
When Sara John's, the daughter of a Russian defector is threatened by a Soviet agent while on a school trip, the 'EYES' team is alerted, and warning bells ring in Whitechapel where one employee shows a more than passing interest in their case. Fred and Tessa go undercover, posing as a grounds man and games mistress respectively, to protect the young schoolgirl while Maggie discovers that Sara's estranged parents are desperately close to revealing a major spy scandal, putting their daughter's life at risk.
17	5	"Rough Trip"	William Brayne	Gerry O'Hara	3 May 1986
When a young schoolboy is abducted by a terrorist group, the C.A.T.S.EYES team discover that Simon Maxstead's father has access to some top secret government information for which the boy is being held to ransom. Nigel orders the case 'top priority' and Maggie, Tessa and Fred uncover a major international terrorist ring from Bangladesh posing behind a front of an innocent grocery shop.
18	6	"Passage Hawk"	Anthony Simmons	Barry Appleton	10 May 1986
Jailed in South Africa for bank robbery, Ben Hutchins is released to custody in England as he is supposedly dying of cancer. On arrival, he tries unsuccessfully to escape from his "escort", Kerber, and evade Maggie and Nigel. Further checking by the 'EYES' team reveals that Hutchins health is, in fact, alright but Kerber, a well-known assassin has his own plans for a funeral at which four prominent black African leaders will be present.
19	7	"Freezeheat"	Terry Marcel	Terence Feely	17 May 1986
drug racket, using a refrigerated trucking company, Coldburn, for cover, is exposed when Chas' lorry is attacked and he turns to Fred and the 'EYES' team for help and protection. When Chas is kidnapped and required to 'talk' by the Coldburn men, his silence is punished by being locked in the deep freeze. The 'EYES' team arrive in the nick of time to save Chas from a chilly ending and a top ranking drug squad commander is exposed.
20	8	"Fit"	Terry Marcel	Reg Ford	24 May 1986
During an army training stint for the 'EYES' team, Sir Jack Fenn tells Maggie that they are holding a top Czech spy, Kessler, for debriefing. On investigating the other recruits, she discovers that a number of them do not 'check out', and Fenn suspects that the KGB want Kessler - dead or alive. Events take on an unexpected turn when a kidnap and subsequent murder attempt on Kessler are foiled by the team, and Fenn also has something to hide.
21	9	"Honeytrap"	Robert Fuest	Terence Feely	31 May 1986
Yuri Yevgenev, a Russian secret agent, lands up in the local police station after being set up by Maggie and the Special Branch boys. In the ensuing KGB attempts to have Yuri returned, Maggie's life is threatened, and Tessa and Fred discover that a Home Office secretary supplied information leading to Maggie's capture. Fred and Tessa affect a dramatic rescue and save Maggie from impending torture.
22	10	"Crack-Up"	Edward Bennett	Paul Wheeler	7 June 1986
Following a car bomb, the 'EYES' team's police contact Roddy is seriously injured, and the team are accused of negligence. Maggie feels responsible and after a period of erratic behaviour, she collapses and is diagnosed as being mentally exhausted. During convalescence, her memory starts to return, and then the truth drug is administered, her recollections reveal unexpected double dealing.
23	11	"Tranmere Dan And Tokyo Joe"	Dennis Abey	Jenny McDade	14 June 1986
When two ex-P.O.W's think they recognise a frighteningly familiar face on the front page of a newspaper, they call in the 'EYES' team to investigate. Meanwhile, Tessa goes undercover as the chauffeur to a junior Government Minister with bizarre tastes which lead the team on a calamity course to danger.

=== Series 3 (1987) ===
No. overall	No. in series	Title	Directed by	Written by	Original release date
24	1	"Twelve Bar Blues"	Gerry Mill	Andy de la Tour	25 April 1987
What's the link between the murder of a stripper in a Middle East nightclub, and Jethro Blackstock, who runs a talent agency and lives in luxury on the South coast? The 'EYES' team investigate a number of cases of arms going missing from local military establishments, and Tessa gets a job as a barmaid in a seedy pub, to find out more. Maggie meets an 'old flame', Derek Moore, who warns her of the dangers involved with Blackstock. The girls remain convinced he is connected with the arms smuggling.
25	2	"Carrier Pigeon"	J.B. Wood	Paul Wheeler	2 May 1987
Fred is visiting Amsterdam for a few days break when she recognises an old school friend working with a film crew who are making a commercial. Later in a Dutch disco, Fred meets up with Sara Fields and they remember the old days. Flying back home, Sara is caught smuggling drugs through customs and is arrested. Convinced her friend is innocent; Fred puts her own life on the line to prove it but was it worth it?
26	3	"Country Weekend"	Raymond Menmuir	Paul Wheeler	9 May 1987
Tessa visits her mother in the country for the weekend, accompanied by Fred. Their break is interrupted when three men arrive and hold them all hostage, and the relaxing weekend does not turn out the way anyone expects.
27	4	"The Big Burn"	Alan Bell	Terence Feely	16 May 1987
The discovery of electronic listening 'bugs' on some valuable antiques stolen from a country house, leads Maggie, Fred and Tessa into the world of espionage and petty crime. The bugs are 'foreign' in design, but why should they have been placed in the home of jailed forger Joe McCrewer.
28	5	"A Naval Affair"	Claude Whatham	Francis Megahy	23 May 1987
Ship designer Alan Moss' house burns down and all his work on revolutionary design concept for warships is destroyed. His plans had previously been rejected by the Admiralty and he was successfully going it alone until the fire. The 'EYES' team join Moss on a sailing trip which goes wrong when the rudder breaks, but they manage to get safely back to shore. An explosion at Maggie's flat seems like another attempt to kill Moss and Maggie goes to the Admiralty where she meets Commander Hutchins, a supporter of Moss' designs.
29	6	"Family Tradition"	Raymond Menmuir	Paul Wheeler	30 May 1987
Following an annual lunch with close friend Sir Edward John - who recruited Nigel - the 'EYES' team investigate Sir Edward's son Howard, a civil servant with access to secrets, who is reportedly acting strange. Maggie gets to know the Howard family when she goes to Sir Edward's 70th birthday party with Nigel. After Howard fails in a suicide bid, Maggie discovers Sir Edward's 'secret' and the reason for Howard's behaviour.
30	7	"Backlash"	Francis Megahy	Terence Feely	6 June 1987
Pressed into taking a fortnight's holiday, Maggie looks up an old school friend but within hours they both narrowly escape a hit and run driver. Then while visiting a stately home, tumbling scaffolding seems like another deliberate attempt on Maggie's life. So, when her friend Penny is shot, a guilty Maggie is determined to find out who is responsible and uncovers some disturbing revelations.
