= Specials (TV series) =

- Country of origin: United Kingdom
- Original language: English
- No. of series: 1
- No. of episodes: 12

Production
- Running time: 50 minutes

Original release
- Network: BBC
- Release: 25 September – 18 December 1991

Specials was a 1991 BBC Birmingham television drama series about Special Constables in a fictional Midlands town.

Twelve 50- minute episodes were made.

The series was shot on videotape at Pebble Mill, Birmingham and using locations around West Bromwich and Birmingham, England.

== Cast ==
- Brian Gwaspari as Section Officer John Redwood
- Martin Cochrane as Special Constable Bob Loach
- Ron Donachie as Special Constable Freddy Calder
- Cindy O'Callaghan as Special Constable Viv Smith
- Kim Vithana as Special Constable Anjail Shah
- Lockwood West as George Adams
