= List of Mind Your Language episodes =

The British sitcom Mind Your Language aired a total of 42 episodes across 4 series between 1977 and 1985.

== Series overview ==
Series	Episodes	Originally released	
Series	Episodes	First released	Last released
1	13	30 December 1977	24 March 1978
2	8	7 October 1978	25 November 1978
3	8	27 October 1979	20 December 1979
4	13	30 September 1985	31 December 1985

== Episodes ==
=== Series 1 ===
No.	Title	Original release date
1	"The First Lesson"	30 December 1977
Jeremy Brown starts his new job as teacher of English as a foreign language (EFL), where he is almost immediately dismissed by the school principal, Miss Courtney, as she had specifically requested a female teacher after the former teacher, Mr Warburton, was driven insane from the same role. After some negotiation, he is allowed to stay on a trial basis. He then meets his students for the first time, a diverse group of ten foreign adult students in London, hailing from nine different countries in Europe and Asia: – The Europeans consist of two au pairs: flirtatious and beautiful Danielle Favre from France, and prim and proper Anna Schmidt from West Germany; two young single men, Giovanni Capello from Italy, and Maximilian Papandrious (“Max” for short) from Greece, who both compete regularly for Danielle's affection; and a laid-back middle-aged bartender from Spain named Juan Cervantes, who doesn't speak or understand English. – The Asians consist of Chung Su-Lee, revolutionary-minded secretary at the Chinese Embassy and stern follower of Chairman Mao's teachings; Taro Nagazumi, a Japanese businessman who works at Bushido Electronics; Ranjeet Singh, a devout Punjabi Sikh London Underground worker who speaks excellent English, though in a notably formal manner; Ali Nadim, an unemployed Pakistani Muslim who often clashes with Ranjeet; and Jamila Ranjah, an Indian Urdu-speaking housewife who (like Juan) cannot speak nor understand English. Throughout this first lesson, Mr Brown increasingly struggles to teach the lesson, ending the episode with him running out of the classroom, having suffered more chaos and difficulties than he expected.
2	"An Inspector Calls"	5 January 1978
An inspector named Roger Kenyon, from the local education authority, arrives at the school to observe the classes, and before intending to visit the woodwork class, comes across Taro and Su-Lee in the middle of a spirited argument. Roger then follows them into the EFL class, at which point Brown mistakes him for a new African foreign student. The inspector plays along and spends time in the class pretending to be a student, giving him a "much clearer picture" on the workings of the school. After Mr Brown complains in front of the inspector about the education board's exam papers and syllabus, Roger praises Mr Brown's teaching, describing Mr Brown as a 'remarkable man', with 'revolutionary' teaching methods, which Miss Courtney treats as her own success. Note: The episode marks the first appearance of Iris Sadler as Gladys, the tea-lady.
3	"A Fate Worse Than Death"	12 January 1978
Ranjeet asks Mr Brown and the rest of the class to help him escape an arranged marriage with Surinder, the daughter of his father’s best friend. Once the 10-year-old Surinder was beautiful, but she now has become so fat, with a temperament to match, that Ranjeet would rather commit suicide than marry her.
4	"All Through the Night"	19 January 1978
Upset that his students’ English is not improving, especially in the presence of Miss Courtney who leaves disappointed, Mr Brown keeps them after class, to the extent that they accidentally get locked in the building by Sid. Note: The episode marks the first appearance of Tommy Godfrey as Sid, the caretaker.
5	"The Best Things in Life"	26 January 1978
Jamila is arrested for shoplifting a magazine due to her misunderstanding of the word “free” in promotional material. However, Mr Brown and Ali later discover that Jamila has shoplifted many other items in the past; and soon, they and the rest of the students try to return the stolen items without being noticed.
6	"Come Back All Is Forgiven"	2 February 1978
It is Mr Brown’s birthday, and everyone in the class has brought him a present. But it is not all happy returns when Miss Courtney informs Mr Brown that his trial month is over and she dismisses him, replacing him with a new teacher named Miss Hardacre. However, Miss Courtney finds out that said Miss Hardacre has a more masculine and imposing attitude than many other men and is taking over the school, so she dismisses her and brings Mr Brown back.
7	"The Cheating Game"	9 February 1978
In order to see how prepared they are for their upcoming exam, the students prepare to take a mock exam. But they all make a lot of mistakes and don’t take the lessons seriously, much to Mr Brown’s anger. Seeing that their teacher has no faith in them, they decide to cheat in order to ace the exam and fake their progress.
8	"Better to Have Loved and Lost"	16 February 1978
Ali and Su-Lee announce that they are to marry, and so Mr Brown and his class celebrate. But Mr Brown gets shocked when he finds out that Ali is already married and plans to take Su-Lee as his second wife, so as to have a baby (as he and his first wife, Rehana, have been unable to conceive a child). As for Su-Lee, she tells Mr Brown that she does not want to marry Ali anymore as she doesn’t truly love him, and so the wedding gets cancelled. Later on, Ali’s initial wife, Rehana, informs him that she is pregnant, giving him and the class another reason to celebrate.
9	"Kill or Cure"	23 February 1978
Mr Brown becomes ill and cannot come to class, so Miss Courtney takes charge. The students’ English and lack of seriousness are not up to her expectations, so she sends them away. Soon after, they all visit Mr Brown at his flat, each with their own “remedy” to make him feel better.
10	"Hello Sailor"	2 March 1978
Juan brings his Russian sailor friend Boris Borisovich to Mr Brown’s class. Boris explains that he wants to defect and stay in England after having fallen love with a girl he just met. Everything seems to be going all right until Ivan Ivanovitch, captain of Boris’ ship, shows up and demands to take his roaming sailor home.
11	"A Point of Honour"	10 March 1978
Mr Brown finds himself in a lot of trouble when Danielle tells Mr Jarvis, a pestering Irish woodwork teacher at the school, that she is engaged to her English teacher. He soon finds himself running around the school in an attempt to quash the false rumour, only to leave wrong impressions and end up in the school gymnasium to box against the philandering teacher.
12	"How's Your Father"	17 March 1978
At the beginning of the lesson, Mr Brown asks the students to speak aloud for one minute each on various topics. When Taro is given the subject about childhood, he sadly tells of his lonely childhood after his parents died when he was a child. Mr Brown sympathises with him, telling he too was an orphan, as he was left on an Easter Monday at an orphanage in Jeremy Street. After some time, Mr Brown meets up with Sid at the pub, during which the caretaker tells the EFL teacher that he left his own baby at an orphanage in Jeremy Street on an Easter Monday, which quickly makes Mr Brown assume that the vulgar Sid may be his father.
13	"The Examination"	24 March 1978
The students prepare to take their Lower Cambridge Certificate exam at the end of the first term. Meanwhile, Mr Brown has a disagreement with a couple in the pub, which comes back to haunt him when it turns out that the man (Mr Short, a former principal of the school) will be supervising the exam.

=== Series 2 ===
No.	Title	Original release date
14	"All Present If Not Correct"	7 October 1978
At the start of the new school year, Mr Brown has two new students, Zoltán Szabo from Hungary (who doesn't speak nor understand English) and au pair Ingrid Svenson from Stockholm. Apart from them, all ten of his previous students show up and return to his class, having failed their exams, much to his disappointment as well as Miss Courtney's – with her usual attitude, she threatens him of dismissal if no improvement occurs.
15	"Queen for a Day"	14 October 1978
It is announced that the Queen and The Duke of Edinburgh will be visiting the school, and Miss Courtney gets over-excited about the event, to the extent that the school is redecorated and the EFL students wear their national costumes.
16	"Brief Re-Encounter"	21 October 1978
Albert Collins, who was Miss Courtney's fiancé 25 years ago, phones her at the school and visits her there later that day. He proposes to her, then asks to borrow money from her, which she accepts. However, Sid recognises him as a conman whose speciality is to propose to lonely women before running away with their money. Absent: Pik-Sen Lim as Chung Su-Lee
17	"Many Happy Returns"	28 October 1978
Ranjeet has been saving up money to visit his mother in Punjab as a surprise for her sixtieth birthday. He hands £230 cash in an envelope to Mr Brown for safe keeping, but the EFL teacher accidentally drops it in front of the school later that day, and Sid picks it up before betting £100 of it on a racing horse – though that horse wins, it's disqualified. Eventually, the students, along with Mr Brown and Sid, make £100 in various ways to help Ranjeet.
18	"Don't Forget the Driver"	4 November 1978
Miss Courtney, Mr Brown and their students go on a field trip to a stately home, travelling on a coach that Sid is driving. They then find themselves stranded in the countryside when the coach breaks down due to lack of fuel. After some time, Sid obtains some petrol from a local farm and they continue; but they arrive late, so the Earl of Barclay who owns it sends them away.
19	"A Hard Day's Night"	11 November 1978
Mr Brown tells the class that he is having his flat painted and has to find somewhere else to spend the night. He initially decides to stay at the YMCA, but after Giovanni and Max offer to let him stay at their flat, he goes there, only to get into trouble with locked doors, a paranoid neighbor who thinks he's a burglar, and the police.
20	"Take Your Partners"	18 November 1978
Miss Courtney coerces Mr Brown into buying two tickets for a charity dance. Anna, Ingrid and Danielle all want to be his partner, so Mr Brown has them decide amongst themselves, with Anna winning. Gladys and Miss Courtney both pressure him to take them. He therefore takes Anna, Gladys and Miss Courtney, all taking turns in dancing.
21	"After Three"	25 November 1978
The class have to prepare for the school's talent show. The students individually do various performances in class in front of Mr Brown and Miss Courtney, but they all perform badly and become rejected. In the end, the class sing the Mind Your Language opening theme together, dressed in their traditional outfits. Note: The episode marks the final appearance of Zoltan and Ingrid in the sitcom (Ingrid would later reappear in the fourth season).

=== Series 3 ===
No.	Title	Original release date
22	"I Belong to Glasgow"	27 October 1979
All the students show up for class except for Ingrid and Zoltan, who has left for Hungary. Soon after, an affluent Arab sheikh (Ahmed Khalil) enrolls his Scottish chauffeur (Russell Hunter) in Mr Brown's class, due to not being able to understand the Scots language. But the Glasgow man causes trouble for everyone in the class due to his obnoxious, hostile and confrontational attitude.
23	"Who Loves Ya Baby?"	3 November 1979
Danielle brings her boss' 9-month-old baby to school, and Gladys suggests to leave him in the canteen. Suddenly, the baby goes missing, as Miss Courtney brings him in to her office, assuming he's been abandoned by someone in the school.
24	"No Flowers by Request"	10 November 1979
Juan suffers from a severe stomach ache and is taken to hospital, accompanied by Mr Brown. But once there, the EFL teacher falls down the stairs, breaks his leg and is admitted to hospital, whereas Juan recovers and returns to school.
25	"Just the Job"	17 November 1979
Mr English, the principal of a commercial school, visits Mr Brown and offers him a better-paid EFL teaching position at the school. Excited, Mr Brown leaves the same day, only to learn upon arrival that the vacancy no longer exists. Disappointed, Mr Brown tries to return to his old position, but he finds that it has been filled by a Mr Wilkins. Giovanni suggests to the students that they all act stupidly so that Mr Wilkins quits. The plan works and Mr Brown returns to his old position.
26	"Guilty or Not Guilty"	24 November 1979
All the students are brought to court for causing various acts of mischief at different places in London performing their assigned homework. Miss Courtney oversees the session as one of the magistrates, while Mr Brown acts as their barrister.
27	"Repent at Leisure"	1 December 1979
Anna's visa as au pair is set to expire, and so her friends suggest that she should marry Mr Brown to become a British citizen.
28	"The School Fete"	8 December 1979
The school holds a fete, and Max is held responsible for hiring Arthur Mullard, who plays himself in this episode. Absent: Pik-Sen Lim as Chung Su-Lee
29	"What a Tangled Web"	15 December 1979
Ali suspects his wife, Rehana, of having an affair. Mr Brown follows her and discovers that she is going to Ranjeet's house – it's actually revealed that with Ranjeet's help, Rehana is secretly planning to throw a surprise party for her husband. The next day, Rehana shows up at school, where Mr Brown tells her in code not to cheat, but she gets the wrong idea, thinking that Ali is having an affair, out of which chaos ensues. Note: The episode marks the final appearance of Ali, Su-Lee, Danielle, Jamila, Max, Taro, Gladys and Sid.

=== Series 4 ===
The series was resurrected for the export market by an independent producer in 1985, Shown in the following ITV regions between 30 September 1985 and 6 March 1987

- TSW was the first ITV region to show the series 30 September – 31 December 1985, (Mondays later Tuesdays 6:30pm)
- Channel Television via the TSW network feed on the above dates
- Granada Television: all episodes from 4 January – 12 April 1986, (Saturdays 2:15pm) (no episodes on 15 and 29 March)
- Anglia: all episodes, from 9 January – 3 April 1986. (Thursdays 7:00pm)
- Central: all episodes, shown as one block of four (1 – 22 February 1986) (Saturdays 5:05pm) and one block of nine (13 July – 14 September 1986) (Sundays 4:00pm later 5:00pm)
- HTV: all episodes over a period from 1 February 1986 – 6 March 1987, (1 - 15 February 1986) (Saturdays 5:05pm) (16 November - 7 December 1986) (Sundays 5:00pm) (16 January - 6 March 1987) (Fridays 11:00pm) (no episode on 27 February due to networked Snooker)
- Tyne Tees: nine episodes from 1 February – 29 March 1986 (Saturdays 5:05pm) (4 episodes not scheduled/shown)
- Border: four episodes, from 1–22 February 1986 (9 episodes not scheduled/shown) (Saturdays 5:05pm) (In both Tyne Tees and Border cases some of those unscheduled later episodes could have been shown at short notice due to last minute programme changes as short notice replacements (not billed in newspapers and TVTimes) for originally scheduled programmes i.e. postponed sporting events)

The final HTV screening block between 16 January and 6 March 1987 Fridays at 11:00pm was the latest time that any episode from all 4 series was shown while Granada had the earliest time slot at 2:15pm the other regions screening Series 4 opted to show them in early evening/teatime slots, while Series 1-3 produced by London Weekend Television were all networked.

Grampian, Thames/LWT (London ITV contractors. All series of the show, including the revival, were produced in London.) Yorkshire, TVS, Scottish and Ulster did not broadcast series 4.

No.	Title	Original release date
30	"Never Say Die"	30 September 1985
Mr Brown mistakenly believes that Miss Courtney is dying. Note: This is the first episode in which Farrukh Azzam, Fu Wong Chang, Maria Papandrious, Michelle Dumas, the caretaker Henshawe and the tea-lady Rita appear.
31	"Too Many Crooks"	7 October 1985
Ranjeet is left in charge of his cousin's shop when two crooks rob it. To evade capture, they hide in the school.
32	"Easy Come Easy Go"	14 October 1985
The students have seven draws on the football pools and stand to win thousands of pounds if they get one more draw.
33	"Fifty Years On"	21 October 1985
On her birthday, Miss Courtney finds a mink coat that Ingrid bought for the lady she's au pairing within her office, mistaking it for her birthday present. Mr Brown has to get the coat back before Ingrid loses her job, and give Miss Courtney her actual present – an engraved wind-up clock – instead. However, when Miss Courtney starts receiving threatening letters from an unknown sender and hears ticking coming from a box on her desk, she assumes the worst.
34	"Time and Tide"	28 October 1985
Mr Brown finds himself in deep water when he takes the students down the Thames to improve their knowledge of English history.
35	"Ghoulies and Ghosties"	4 November 1985
Mr Brown scoffs at the suggestion that the school is haunted.
36	"Mama Mia"	11 November 1985
Giovanni's mother visits him at the school.
37	"A Rash Decision"	18 November 1985
Mr Brown and all the students catch a rash and fever, and soon they are admitted to a quarantine ward.
38	"Wedding Fever"	25 November 1985
Juan and Maria have fallen in love and arranged to be married by special licence at the nearby Catholic church. Suddenly, Juan gets himself accidentally locked in the school the night before the wedding.
39	"Everybody's Out"	2 December 1985
There is discontent when the students form their own union.
40	"The First Lady"	9 December 1985
Mr Brown is suffering from flu and has a bizarre dream involving destruction at the school. When he returns to school, he finds his dream has become a nightmare.
41	"Teacher's Pet"	16 December 1985
Mr Brown brings his neighbour's dog to class.
42	"End of Term"	31 December 1985
The school is closed. Miss Courtney is busy preparing for a European tour, while Mr Brown and the students arrive to find out how they have fared in their examinations. Note: Final episode to mark the appearance of Mr Brown, Miss Courtney, Rita, Henshawe and all the rest of the students; the final episode of Mind Your Language.

IMDb for Series 4 lists the Granada dates.
