= Comedy Premiere =

1975 British television series

Comedy Premiere is a British television comedy series that aired in 1975. It is an anthology of six sitcom pilots. It was produced by Associated Television (ATV). All six episodes are believed to have been destroyed.

== Episodes ==
Title	Release date	Starring
What A Turn Up	7 August 1975	Bernard Lee, Diana King, Anton Rodgers, Vivian Pickles, Nina Thomas, Martin Neil
For Richer For Poorer	14 August 1975	George Layton, Ian Ogilvy, Susan Dury, Jane How, Peter Hill
Honey	21 August 1975	Michael Bates, Ronnie Brody, Kathleen Byron, Sandra Dickinson, Barbara Kellerman, Bernard Holley, Frank Coda
The Truth About Verity	28 August 1975	Sylvia Syms, John Carlin, John Savident, Ed Devereaux, Frank Coda
Milk-O	26 November 1975	Bob Grant, Anna Karen, Leslie Dwyer, Alan Curtis, Peter Greene
