= Rooms (TV series) =

- Genre: Drama
- Created by: John Finch
- Developed by: Tony Holland (story editor)
- Written by: Adele Rose; Peter King; Robert Banks Stewart; Fay Weldon
- Starring: Sylvia Kay; Bryan Marshall; William Marlowe; Jill Gascoine; Ian Redford
- Theme music composer: Denis King
- Ending theme: "No Place Like Home" (second series)
- Country of origin: United Kingdom
- Original language: English
- No. of series: 2
- No. of episodes: 120

Production
- Producer: Jacqueline Davis
- Running time: 25 minutes
- Production company: Thames Television

Original release
- Network: ITV
- Release: 5 November 1974 – 8 June 1977

Rooms is a drama series produced by Thames Television for the ITV Network between 1974 and 1977. As the name suggests it focused on the lives of people renting rooms in a rather down-at-heel London house of multiple occupancy.

Set in a Victorian former town house on the fictional Mafeking Terrace, the format of the series differed from soap opera in that the stories were largely distinct, occupying just a few episodes at a time. As a result, and in keeping with the transitory nature of the setting, most of the cast changed after a few appearances, with only a handful of cast members appearing as regulars, sometimes featuring only as secondary characters.

== Semi-regular cast ==
- Sylvia Kay (1974–76)
- Bryan Marshall (1974–76)
- Ian Redford (1975–77)
- Anne Dyson (1977)
- William Marlowe (1977)
- Jill Gascoine (1977)

== Guest cast ==
The guest cast included many actors who went on to find fame in film and television, including Brian Cox, Bernard Hill, Nigel Havers, Lewis Collins, Annette Crosbie, Jan Francis, John Duttine, Maureen Lipman and Tessa Wyatt.

== Writers ==
A number of distinguished writers worked on the series in their early careers, including Fay Weldon, Willis Hall, Christopher H. Bidmead, Leslie Duxbury, Adele Rose, Donald Churchill and Robert Banks Stewart.

== Broadcast ==
It was broadcast twice-weekly in a mid-afternoon slot on ITV, with some scheduling variations in different broadcast regions. Consequently it was never intended to be a huge ratings winner. After it was shown in the 70s it went unrepeated until it was picked up by the Talking Pictures TV archive channel in 2019.
