= George Camiller =

English actor (born 1942)

- Born: 30 November 1942 (age 83); Surrey, England
- Education: Royal Central School of Speech and Drama
- Occupation: Actor

George Camiller (born 30 November 1942) is an English actor. He is best known for playing the role of Giovanni Cupello, an Italian student in Jeremy Brown's EFL class in the popular British sitcom Mind Your Language and one of four students (along with Juan Cervantes, Anna Schmidt, and Ranjeet Singh) to appear in all four series.

He has acted in a number of movies and TV series and has performed alongside Omar Sharif, Anthony Quinn. He studied at Royal Central School of Speech and Drama at the same time as Tony Robinson and Bruce Robinson. Another classmate, Keith Washington, appeared with Camiller in the show Jesus of Nazareth in 1977.

Camiller was born in 1942 to Italian parents. He now lives in Hampstead.

== Credits ==
=== Film ===
- Three Men in a Boat (1975) as Shelley
- The Message (1976) as Walid ibn Utbah
- The Hunger (1983) as Eumenes
- Harem (1986) as Vizier boy
- Slipstream (1989) as 2nd man at table
- The Visual Bible: Gospel of John (2003) as Pharisee #2
- Love's Kitchen (2011) as Brian
- Arifa (2019) as George Cameron

=== Television ===
- Broome Stages (1966) as Dickson
- Hadleigh (1969) as Len
- Who-Dun-It (1969) as Guido
- Manhunt (1970) as Phillipe
- Jason King (1972) as Cafe waiter
- New Scotland Yard (1973) as Receptionist
- Wessex Tales (1973) as Robert Trewe
- Play of the Month (1974) as Pedro
- Mind Your Language (1977–1985) as Giovanni Capello
- Jesus of Nazareth (1977) as Hosias
- The Other One (1977) as Spaniard
- Strangers (1978) episode "Marriages, Deaths and Births" as Johnny Carmos
- The Borgias (1981) as Juan Borgia
- Minder (1982) as Angelis
- The Forgotten Story (1983) as Ned Pawlyn
- Hart to Hart (1983) as Victor
- Duty Free (1984–1986) as Manager
- Crossbow (1987) as John Geshman
- Chris Cross (1993) as El Jefe Del Puercos
- Mike and Angelo (1997) as Antony
- Peak Practice (1998) as Mario
- The Bill (2000) as Solicitor
- The Knock (2000) as Meltin
- Judge John Deed (2001–2005) as Clive Kadans
- Paradise Heights (2002) as Stefan Tradot
- ChuckleVision (2007) as Spanish king
- The Omid Djalili Show (2007)
