= Anna Karen =

British actress (1936–2022)

- Karen as Aunt Sal in EastEnders
- Born: Ann Harrison McCall; 19 September 1936; Durban, South Africa
- Died: 22 February 2022 (aged 85); Ilford, London, England
- Resting place: Golders Green Crematorium
- Education: London School of Dramatic Art
- Occupation: Actress
- Years active: 1959–2017
- Television: On the Buses; The Rag Trade; EastEnders
- Spouses: Richard Smart (m. 1957, divorced) Terry Duggan (m. 1967; died 2008)

Ann Harrison McCall (19 September 1936 – 22 February 2022), professionally known as Anna Karen, was a British actress best known for playing Olive Rudge in the ITV sitcom On the Buses from 1969 to 1973 including its film spin-offs and stage version and Aunt Sal in the BBC soap opera EastEnders on a recurring basis from 1996 to 2017. She also reprised the role of Olive Rudge in The Rag Trade from 1977 to 1978, while her film roles included parts in two Carry On films: Carry On Camping (1969) and Carry On Loving (1970).

== Early life ==
Karen was born in Durban, South Africa, on 19 September 1936 as Ann Harrison McCall to John and Muriel McCall (née Harrison). Her father was an accountant from Ireland, while her mother was English. Karen developed an interest in acting at a young age, and joined the South African National Theatre at the age of fifteen. She starred in several touring productions over the next two years. According to Karen, the South African National Theatre Company had hired a black stage manager and Karen broke apartheid-era laws by visiting the manager's home to see his sick daughter.

Advised to leave South Africa, Karen moved to London at the age of 17. She shared a room with two other girls in a girls' hostel in Paddington and enrolled at the London School of Dramatic Art. She began working as a kitchen porter, washing up at a local restaurant in the evenings to help pay for her rent and drama school fees, however she learnt that she could earn twice as much money if she worked as a striptease dancer at London's Panama Club, which she did.

== Career ==
Making her debut in the naturist film Nudist Memories (1961), Karen began her career as an extra in the comedy film The Sandwich Man (1966) and had a small role as Carol White's neighbour in Ken Loach's kitchen sink drama film Poor Cow (1967). She then had a role as a schoolgirl in Carry On Camping (1969) in which she has a fight with Barbara Windsor at the start of the film, although she can be clearly seen in later scenes, including the "bikini flying" sequence; Karen and Windsor became good friends. Windsor's next acting job was in the BBC sitcom Wild, Wild Women; Windsor encouraged Karen to audition for a role. Karen played the part of Maude in the series.

During the production of Wild, Wild Women, Karen was approached by Ronald Wolfe and Ronald Chesney. Impressed with her performance, they offered her the role of Olive, the dowdy, overweight, bespectacled, sexually frustrated younger sister of Stan (Reg Varney), and wife of Arthur Rudge (Michael Robbins) in their forthcoming sitcom On the Buses. Karen played the part of Olive, the role for which she is best remembered, in all 74 episodes of the series. Karen, who was actually a model in her spare time, donned an unstylish wig, an unflattering pair of thick glasses, and large amounts of padding to become Olive, whom she described as the "ugliest woman on television".

Karen maintained a successful acting career alongside On the Buses. Shortly after the series began, she had a role in another Carry On film, Carry On Loving (1970) in the final "food fight" scene as a woman who gets cake down her shirt, and appeared in an episode of Dixon of Dock Green. By this time, On the Buses, produced by LWT, had become a huge success leading Karen to reprise her role in a spin-off film, On the Buses (1971). This also was hugely popular and was the highest-grossing film of 1971, beating the James Bond film Diamonds Are Forever which was released the same year.

Two further spin-off films were made, Mutiny on the Buses (1972), and Holiday on the Buses (1973) with Stan working as a bus driver at a holiday camp in Prestatyn, Wales. By the time the third film was made, On the Buses had come to an end, having just broadcast its seventh series. Karen and co-stars Bob Grant and Stephen Lewis were the only members of the cast to appear in all seventy-four episodes of the series, as well as the three feature films.

After On the Buses ended, Karen returned to theatre in 1974 and toured as Minnie in Who Goes Bare? and in Not Now, Darling as Miss Tipdale with Ian Lavender. In 1975 however, Karen starred alongside her On the Buses co-star Bob Grant in a comedy pilot called "Milk-O" released under the Comedy Premiere series. Revolving around a milkman (played by Grant) trying to fend off amorous housewives, Karen played Rita Wilkins, the wife of Grant's character Jim. The pilot was also written by Grant aiming to reinvigorate his declining career due to the typecasting he received from On the Buses, however it was not commissioned for a series. After this, Karen had roles in the sitcom ...And Mother Makes Five and in comedy sketch shows such as The Kenneth Williams Show and The Dick Emery Show.

From 1977 to 1978, Karen reprised the role of Olive in the LWT revival of the sitcom The Rag Trade created by the same writers as On the Buses. The series depicted a group of female workers in a clothes factory; Karen appeared in all 22 episodes. She also made a cameo appearance in the sex-comedy film What's Up Nurse! (1977). Much of Karen's work in the 1980s and 1990s consisted of roles in the theatre. In 1981, Karen had a main role in the sci-fi children's film Stainless Steel and the Star Spies about a group of robots intending to invade Earth to claim a crystal ball with extraterrestrial qualities. From 1985 to 1986, Karen had a main role in the sitcom Troubles and Strife alongside Annette Badland, however the series was not a success. She also appeared in several children's television series towards the late 1980s, including Roland Rat and The Sooty Show.

In 1996, she played a supporting role in the film Beautiful Thing, as a neighbour of the main characters, Ste and Jamie. That same year, she reunited with Barbara Windsor, this time in the BBC soap opera EastEnders. Karen played Aunt Sal, the sister of Windsor's Peggy Mitchell. Although she was never a permanent cast member in the soap, she appeared as Aunt Sal occasionally, usually for only one or two episodes at a time. Alongside EastEnders, in the late 1990s, Karen appeared in a number of educational films as well as an episode of Goodnight Sweetheart.

In 2006, Karen used her experience as a striptease dancer to act as a judge in the final edition of Channel 4's reality television documentary Faking It. In 2008, she was a guest on the Channel 4's Sunday Night Project, again with Barbara Windsor.

Karen was also a regular in pantomimes over the years, and played the Wicked Stepmother in Cinderella at the Millfield Theatre, in Edmonton, London, at Christmas 2008.

In 2014, Karen had a role in an episode of Doctors while she later starred in the thriller film No Reasons (2016). In 2017, Karen and several other members of the cast of Holiday on the Buses returned to the holiday camp in Wales where the movie was filmed as part of a On the Buses Fan Club trip; this included revisiting filming locations.

Karen regularly appeared at fan conventions until at least 2019.

== Personal life ==
In 1957, Karen married Richard Smart with whom she lived in Italy for several years while he trained to be an opera singer. However, the pair divorced and Karen returned to England.

Karen was married to actor/comedian Terry Duggan from 1967 until his death in 2008 and lived in Ilford, east London. Although Karen had no children of her own, she raised Gloria, Duggan's daughter from his first marriage.

Karen was best friends with Barbara Windsor, having met her during the filming of Carry On Camping. Windsor left Karen £1,000 in her will. Karen kept in regular contact with Windsor's husband Scott Mitchell after Windsor's death, with the two speaking on the phone for the last time just weeks before Karen's death.

Karen regularly taught drama on Saturday mornings at Brewers Academy in Hornchurch, Greater London.

In January 2016, she had a fall at her home in Ilford and broke her back, leaving her sofa-bound for eight weeks to recover. She still filmed scenes for Peggy's death in EastEnders in March 2016 and again in May 2016; when the scenes were broadcast, she was seen with a walking frame. She was later seen in a wheelchair during her final scenes in EastEnders in January 2017 and also at Windsor's funeral in January 2021, which would be her final public appearance.

== Death ==
Shortly after 22:30 GMT on 22 February 2022, the London Fire Brigade were called to a fire at Karen's Ilford home, where she was pronounced dead at the scene. She was 85. Metropolitan Police said her death was not suspicious and later concluded that the fire started after she fell asleep with a lit cigarette.

Karen's funeral took place on 18 March 2022 at Golders Green Crematorium and was attended by many of her co-stars, including John Altman, Jamie Borthwick, Peter Dean, Linda Lusardi, Kate Williams and Vicki Michelle. Barbara Windsor's widower, Scott Mitchell, was also in attendance.

== Filmography ==
=== Film ===
Years	Title	Role	Notes
1961	Nudist Memories	Anne	Uncredited
1965	He Who Rides a Tiger	Extra	Uncredited
1966	The Sandwich Man	Lady with dog	Uncredited
1967	Poor Cow	Neighbour	
1969	Lock Up Your Daughters!	Extra	Uncredited
1969	Carry On Camping	Schoolgirl	
1970	Carry On Loving	Wife	
1971	On the Buses	Olive Rudge	
1972	Mutiny on the Buses	Olive Rudge	
1972	Top Gear	Mrs Redway	
1973	Holiday on the Buses	Olive Rudge	
1977	What's Up Nurse!	Knitter	
1996	Beautiful Thing	Marlene	
1998	Cash in Hand	Unknown	
2001	Possessions	Fanny Gapp	
2005	Together Alone	Mrs Golding	
2008	Flick	Rita Ray	
2016	No Reasons	Yvonne	

=== Television ===
Years	Title	Role	Notes
1966	Isadora Duncan	Extra	TV film
1967	The Wednesday Play	Extra	Episode: "Profile of a Gentleman"
1968	Life with Cooper	Various	Episode: "In Pictures"
1969	Wild, Wild Women	Maude	Main cast; all 6 episodes
1969	Rembrandt	Peasant	TV film
1969–1973	On the Buses	Olive Rudge	Main cast; all 74 episodes
1970	Dixon of Dock Green	Housewife	Episode: "Waste Land"
1975	Comedy Premiere	Rita Wilkins	Episode: "Milk-O"
1976	...And Mother Makes Five	Mrs Hitchin	Episode: "None So Blind"
1976	The Kenneth Williams Show	Jury Member	Episode: #2.1
1976	Rainbow	Anna	Episode: "Food: Potatoes"
1977	The Dick Emery Show	Various	Episode: #16.8
1977–1978	The Rag Trade	Olive Butler (Rudge)	Main cast; all 22 episodes
1981	Stainless Steel and the Star Spies	Mary	TV film
1985–1986	Troubles and Strife	Rosita Pearman	Main cast; all 12 episodes
1986	Roland Rat: The Series	Maureen McConkey	Main cast; 14 episodes
1987	The Sooty Show	Mrs Woodhead	Episode: "Computer Dating"
1987	Super Gran	Commander S. Obvious	Episode: "Chisleton Street Blues"
1996–1997, 2001–2004, 2007–2011, 2013–2017	EastEnders	Aunt Sal	Recurring role, 57 episodes
1998	Goodnight Sweetheart	Mrs Hardcore	Episode: "Have You Ever Seen a Dream Walking?"
1999	Boyz Unlimited	Nigel's Mum	Episode: #1.5
2002	The Bill	Margie Connell	2 episodes
2004	Revolver	Julie	Episode: #1.4
2004	The Second Quest	Sally	TV film
2005	The Golden Hour	Rita Philips	Episode: #1.1
2014	Doctors	Renee Gossman	Episode: "Small Favours"
2016	Nearly New	Joan	TV pilot
