= The Gentle Touch =

British police drama television series

- Main title screen featuring Jill Gascoine
- Created by: Terence Feely
- Starring: Jill Gascoine; William Marlowe; Brian Gwaspari; Paul Moriarty; Nigel Rathbone; Derek Thompson; Bernard Holley
- Opening theme: Roger Webb
- Country of origin: United Kingdom
- Original language: English
- No. of series: 5
- No. of episodes: 56 (list of episodes)

Production
- Running time: 60 mins (inc. commercials)
- Production company: LWT

Original release
- Network: ITV
- Release: 11 April 1980 – 24 November 1984

Related
- C.A.T.S. Eyes

The Gentle Touch is a British police procedural drama series made by LWT for ITV which began on 11 April 1980 and ran until 24 November 1984. The series is notable for being the first British series to feature a female police officer as its leading character, premiering four months ahead of the similarly themed BBC series Juliet Bravo.

== Series history ==
The series starred Jill Gascoine as Detective Inspector Maggie Forbes, who has worked her way up through the ranks of the police force and is based at the fictional Seven Dials police station in London. Maggie's husband, a police constable, is murdered during the first episode, leaving her to juggle her career with single parenthood, raising her teenage son.

The Gentle Touch largely dealt with routine police procedures and offered a frank depiction of relevant social issues (including racism, sexism, homosexuality, mental health and euthanasia). It was relatively low on action and violence in comparison to previous classic crime series such as The Sweeney, opting for a more realistic and low key approach. Although the series mostly focused on Maggie's professional life in a male-dominated field, it also showed her home life with her elderly father George and her teenage son Steve. Occasionally, Maggie's romantic involvements were seen which sometimes clashed with her job.

The Gentle Touch ran for five series until 1984, and made Gascoine a household name. It was a ratings success in the UK, where it was screened on Friday nights in a 9.00 p.m. slot (except for the final series which was shown on Saturday nights). One episode shown in January 1982 garnered over 18 million viewers and was the fifth most watched television programme in Britain that year.

== Spin-off ==
Gascoine returned as Maggie Forbes in the more action-oriented spin-off series C.A.T.S. Eyes (also created by Terence Feely), concerning a specialised team of female detectives in Kent who covertly work for the Home Office. C.A.T.S. Eyes lasted three series from 1985 to 1987.

== Main cast ==
- Jill Gascoine as Detective Inspector Maggie Forbes
- William Marlowe as Detective Chief Inspector Bill Russell
- Brian Gwaspari as Detective Inspector Bob Croft (1980–1983)
- Derek Thompson as Detective Sergeant Jimmy Fenton (1980–1982)
- Paul Moriarty as Detective Sergeant Jake Barrett
- Nigel Rathbone as Steve Forbes
- Kevin O'Shea as Detective Sergeant Peter Phillips (1982–1984)
- Bernard Holley as Detective Inspector Mike Turnbull (1982–1984)
- James Ottaway as George Taylor (1980-1982, 1984)
- Michael Graham Cox as Detective Inspector Jack Slater (1984)

== Episodes ==
series
Series	Episodes	Originally released	
Series	Episodes	First released	Last released
1	7	11 April 1980	23 May 1980
2	10	5 September 1980	7 November 1980
3	13	6 November 1981	5 February 1982
4	13	22 October 1982	28 January 1983
5	13	1 September 1984	24 November 1984

== Home media ==
The complete series is available on DVD in the UK in five series sets from Network.
