= Aunt Sal =

Fictional character from EastEnders

- EastEnders character
- Portrayed by: Anna Karen
- Duration: 1996–1997; 2001–2004; 2007–2011; 2013–2017
- First appearance: Episode 1266; 21 March 1996
- Last appearance: Episode 5428; 20 January 2017
- Introduced by: Corinne Hollingworth (1996); Jane Harris (1997); John Yorke (2001); Louise Berridge (2003); Diederick Santer (2007); Bryan Kirkwood (2010); Lorraine Newman (2013); Dominic Treadwell-Collins (2014); Sean O'Connor (2016)
In-universe information
- Other names: Sal Martin
- Occupation: Retired
- Father: Jack Martin
- Mother: Lilly Martin
- Sisters: Peggy Mitchell
- Husband: Harold Martin (until 2024)
- Sons: Lenny Martin
- Daughters: Loretta Martin
- Nephews: Phil Mitchell; Grant Mitchell
- Nieces: Sam Mitchell
- Other relatives: Ben Mitchell; Louise Mitchell; Courtney Mitchell

Aunt Sal (also known as Sal Martin) is a recurring fictional character in the BBC soap opera EastEnders, played by Anna Karen. Introduced in 1996, she appeared sporadically from 21 March 1996 until 29 December 1997, then from 28 September 2001 until 17 September 2004, 19 July 2007 until 4 April 2011 and 22 November 2013 to 20 January 2017. She appears for just a few episodes at a time and has been collectively featured in 58 episodes of the show.

The character has, on occasion, been credited as Sal Martin, which has been referenced at different times as both her maiden and married surname. In November 2023, it was reported that the character would be killed-off, off-screen, following Karen's death in February 2022. Aunt Sal died off-screen on 10 January 2024, and an episode featuring the character's funeral was broadcast on 15 January 2024. David Sterne made a guest appearance as Aunt Sal's bereaved husband, Harold Martin.

== Creation and development ==
In February 1996, it was announced that comedy actress Anna Karen would be joining the cast of EastEnders as Peggy Mitchell's sister Sal. Anna Karen and the actress who had played Peggy, Barbara Windsor, were "best friends" in real life and Windsor had expressed how happy she was to have Karen on the cast of EastEnders

Producers decided to hire Karen after Michael French, who played "romeo" David Wicks decided to quit. They reportedly failed to lure back June Brown, who played Dot Cotton between 1985 and 1993 (although they were successful in doing so a year later). They asked Karen to audition and decided she "was just the ticket".

Commenting on her casting, Karen said, "It's great to be back on the box and a real treat to be working alongside my old mate [Barbara Windsor]."

Kate Lock brands Sal as "Peggy's blabbermouth sister" and "She has a hide thicker than Peggy's, a penchant for interfering and a tendency to become loud and hideously embarrassing after a couple of drinks".

== Storylines ==
=== 1996–1997 ===
Sal is the older sister of Peggy Mitchell (Barbara Windsor) and usually appears at Mitchell family occasions or when she's had an argument with her husband, Harold (David Sterne). Sal is a heavy smoker and when visiting her sister, enjoys parking herself at the end of the bar with her cigarette (that is, until the smoking ban, when she would just go upstairs). Peggy also goes to stay with her when she needs somewhere to rest. She is married to downtrodden Harold, and mentions a son in January 1997 and a daughter to Peggy at Grant (Ross Kemp) and Tiffany Mitchell's (Martine McCutcheon) wedding blessing ceremony. She also mentions in 1997 that she ran a pub. Her first appearance is at Peggy's 54th birthday party in 1996. This also coincides with the birth of Peggy's grandson and Sal's great-nephew, Ben Mitchell (Matthew Silver). She appears again in January 1997, to support Peggy through her breast cancer, and then again at Grant and Tiffany's blessing where she stands in for Peggy in August 1997. Sal comes to stay with the Mitchell family for Christmas 1997. During her visit she takes baby Courtney Mitchell for a walk and leaves her outside the café in her pram. Whilst Sal is inside, Courtney is taken, causing everyone to panic. She is later found being looked after by Bianca Butcher (Patsy Palmer), Tiffany's best friend.

=== 2001–2004 ===
Other appearances include Peggy and Harry Slater's (Michael Elphick) engagement party in 2001, Louise Mitchell's naming party in October 2002, Jamie Mitchell's (Jack Ryder) funeral in January 2003, and Sam Mitchell's (Kim Medcalf) wedding to Andy Hunter (Michael Higgs) in September 2004.

=== 2007–2011 ===
She returns in July 2007 for her nephew Phil Mitchell's (Steve McFadden) wedding to Stella Crawford (Sophie Thompson) and portentously notes that Stella would never be a Mitchell. She also returns when Peggy throws her a birthday party on 17 December 2007 and again on Christmas Day 2007 when she drunkenly infuriates Phil. On 8 July 2008 she returns again to keep an eye on Billy (Perry Fenwick) and Honey Mitchell (Emma Barton) whilst they look after The Queen Vic as Peggy is away. She makes another appearance on 14 August 2008 for Peggy and Archie Mitchell's (Larry Lamb) engagement party. Sal straight away speaks her mind about Archie, not knowing that he is next to her. She spends Christmas Eve 2008 with Peggy, complaining about the price of her taxi and joking about Jean Slater's (Gillian Wright) health condition. She is next seen on 2 March 2009 when Janine Butcher (Charlie Brooks) invited her to dinner. Janine gets her drunk before extracting information about Peggy's past, so she can use something to humiliate Peggy. Sal reveals to Janine that she and her sister, Peggy were involved in pole dancing for the gangland in the 1960s. Janine couriers a huge photo of Peggy pole-dancing to ruin her political campaign. Peggy is humiliated and everyone finds out about her past.

Sal attends Peggy's hen night later in the month and following Peggy's wedding to Archie in April 2009 and the startling revelations that follow, Sal takes Peggy back to her home with her to escape Archie. Peggy returns home the following week but after feeling let down by Phil who won't kill Archie, she goes away on holiday with Sal to the Bahamas. She returns again in June and attends a meal at Ronnie Mitchell's (Samantha Womack) with Peggy. They snoop around and find an engagement ring. On 17 December 2009, she arrives at The Queen Vic as it is her 70th birthday. Everyone forgot, but the family tell her of a special lunch in her honour in the community centre, which is actually a Christmas lunch event to try to raise money for the debt-stricken Mitchells. She complains about the food and tells another diner she hopes there will be entertainment. She guesses that Ronnie is pregnant and Roxy Mitchell (Rita Simons) tells her about the Mitchells' debt problems. When the diners demand entertainment, she helps out by performing her fire eating routine. She later accidentally reveals that Ronnie is pregnant.

Peggy invites Sal to a family dinner in August 2010, but Sal manages to insult Ronnie, Roxy, Billy, Jack Branning (Scott Maslen), Pat Evans (Pam St Clement) and all of Peggy's children and grandchildren in the space of three minutes, leading them to argue, so Peggy throws her sister out. In November, she arrives uninvited for Ronnie and Jack's wedding. In April 2011, Ronnie goes missing, after she becomes depressed. Sal rings Roxy to let her know that Ronnie is with her. Sal appears when Roxy and Jack come to talk to Ronnie and take her home.

=== 2013–2017 ===
Sal returns again in November 2013, when she turns up uninvited for Roxy's hen party, before her wedding to Alfie Moon (Shane Richie). Sal rudely expresses her doubts about Alfie and marriage in general, stating that women in the Mitchell family are cursed when it comes to love. She then attends the wedding, but moments after Roxy and Alfie are married, Alfie realises that he is still in love with his ex-wife, Kat Moon (Jessie Wallace). In September 2014, it is revealed that Sal is now living in Portugal, with Peggy and Ronnie. She speaks to Ronnie, off-screen and Peggy reveals that she does not want Phil to marry Sharon Rickman (Letitia Dean). Peggy then sends Sal and Ronnie back to Walford, in a bid to try and stop the wedding. She ultimately fails in the task, but reveals Peggy's feelings at the reception to all the guests by reading a text from her sister. To prove she is unaffected, Sharon drops her phone in a pint of beer. She returns in November 2015 for a family meal where Ronnie is arrested for murder, and she along with the other Mitchells disown Roxy after she is uncovered as the person who called the police. It is also revealed that Sal knows Claudette Hubbard (Ellen Thomas), and as Sal is leaving Walford, she reminds Claudette that she knows a secret from her past, and that one day it will be revealed.

In January 2016, Phil contacts Sal, asking for Louise's (now played by Tilly Keeper) address (albeit off-screen). This leads to Phil's discovery that Peggy's cancer has returned and that she is dying. In May 2016, Sal and Phil arrive at Ronnie's house, looking for Peggy. Peggy is hiding from them, because Sal wants all the family to know about Peggy's cancer. Ronnie denies that Peggy is there, but Sal recognises the smell of Peggy's perfume, so she reveals herself. Peggy refuses to return to Sal's house, saying that Walford is her home. The sisters then embrace emotionally. After Peggy commits suicide, Sal attends her funeral in July 2016, using a wheelchair. After the funeral, Sal explains to Sharon that Peggy called the police on her abusive husband, Eric (George Russo), to protect Phil, showing Phil just how much Peggy loved him. In September 2016, it is shown that Grant has been staying with Sal, but he later decides to return to Portugal. Sal later returns in December 2016 for Ronnie's hen party for her second wedding to Jack, where she reveals she has taught herself how to read tarot cards. She performs this on Ronnie and Roxy. Ronnie selects cards that show positivity, a happy life and marriage, while Roxy selects The Fool, The Devil and Death. Roxy exclaims to Sal and Ronnie that Sal does not know what she is doing. Sal attends Ronnie and Jack's wedding on New Year's Day 2017, after which Roxy and Ronnie die after drowning in a hotel swimming pool. Later that month, Sal attends Ronnie and Roxy's funerals, where she berates their mother, Glenda Mitchell (Glynis Barber), for walking out on them when they were children, resulting in Glenda fleeing the church in tears. This marks Sal's final appearance. In January 2022, Sharon mentions that Phil is likely hiding in Sal's holiday home while on the run from the police. In January 2024, Phil receives a call informing him that Sal has died. Sal leaves Phil, Grant and Sam £100,000 in her will.

== Reception ==
In late 2015, Laura-Jayne Tyler of Inside Soap wrote "Dear Walford bosses. Please just make Aunt Sal a regular character. She'd be brilliant in the Mitchell house, nagging Phil and Sharon to death."
