= Cindy O'Callaghan =

Irish actress

- Born: 18 October 1956 (age 70); Ireland
- Occupations: Actress (formerly); Child psychologist
- Years active: 1971–2001
- Children: 1

Cindy O'Callaghan (born 18 October 1956) is an Irish-born British psychologist and former actress. Her acting career began in her adolescence, when she was chosen to play the part of Carrie Rawlins in the Disney feature film Bedknobs and Broomsticks in 1971. She has appeared in a wide range of television programmes and films since, including BBC's EastEnders, where she played Andrea Price for several stints in the 1990s. Her last credited role was in 2001, and she has since given up acting to become a child psychologist.

== Career ==
O'Callaghan played Carrie Rawlins in Bedknobs and Broomsticks (1971), where she starred opposite Angela Lansbury and David Tomlinson. She has appeared in numerous television programmes throughout the 1970s, '80s, '90s and early 2000s, including ITV's The Bill, Casualty, Specials, Boon, Rumpole of the Bailey, Woof! and as Linda Kennedy in the BBC soap opera Triangle, among others. She has appeared in films, including Hanover Street and I.D.

More recently she is known for her role as Andrea Price—the "boozy" mother of Natalie Evans (Lucy Speed)—in the BBC soap opera EastEnders (1994–1995; 1999). This was O'Callaghan's second role in the soap, having previously played Stella – the mistress of Ashraf Karim – from 1989 to 1990.

O'Callaghan attended university in 2000, and in 2004 it was reported that she had given up acting to become a child psychologist.

== Selected filmography ==
Film credits include:

- Bedknobs and Broomsticks (1971)
- Hanover Street (1979)
- Dangerous Davies: The Last Detective (1981)
- The Hound of the Baskervilles (1983)
- I.D. (1995)

Television credits include:

- Thursday's Child (1972–1973)
- Target (1978)
- Play For Today (1979)
- Angels (1980)
- Fox (1980)
- Triangle (1981)
- Now and Then (1983–1984)
- Gems (1985–1986)
- No Place Like Home (1986)
- Rockliffe's Babies (1988)
- Rumpole of the Bailey (1988)
- Boon (1989)
- Specials (1991)
- Bergerac (1991)
- Virtual Murder (1992)
- Love Hurts (1993)
- Woof! (1997)
- Casualty (1993; 1995)
- EastEnders (1989–1990; 1994–1995; 1999)
- The Bill (1992; 1999; 1997; 2001)
