= Pik-Sen Lim =

Malaysian-British actress (1944–2025)

- Lim as Killer Cleaner in Johnny English Reborn (2011)
- Born: Lim Phaik-Seng; 15 September 1944; Tōjō-to (Penang), Japanese-occupied Malaya
- Died: 9 June 2025 (aged 80); Ludlow, Shropshire, England
- Education: London School of Dramatic Art
- Occupation: Actress
- Years active: 1964–2025
- Spouse: Don Houghton (m. 1968; div. 198?)
- Children: 1

Chinese name
- Chinese: 林碧笙
Transcriptions
Standard Mandarin
- Hanyu Pinyin: Lín Bìshēng
Hakka
- Romanization: Lìm Pit-sên
Yue: Cantonese
- Jyutping: Lam^{4} Bik^{1} Sang^{1}
Southern Min
- Hokkien POJ: Lîm Phek-seng

Pik-Sen Lim (Chinese: 林碧笙; pinyin: Lín Bìshēng; Pe̍h-ōe-jī: Lîm Phek-seng, 15 September 1944 – 9 June 2025) was a Malaysian-British actress. Born to Malaysian Chinese parents in Penang, she moved to the United Kingdom in 1961 to attend the London School of Dramatic Art. According to the BFI, Lim was "the most familiar Chinese actor on British television screens in the 1970s and 80s."

Lim's notable roles include Chin Lee in the 1971 Doctor Who serial The Mind of Evil, Chung Su-Lee on the ITV sitcom Mind Your Language (1977–79), Tsai Adams on the military drama Spearhead (1978–81), and the killer cleaner in Johnny English Reborn (2011). She was also the narrator for the Dark Souls video game series.

== Early life ==
Lim was born to Malayan Chinese parents in Penang, Straits Settlements (occupied by Japan at the time), and was the daughter of the palm oil millionaire Lim Cheng-Teik. She attended convent school in Penang, where she was nicknamed "Pixie". From a young age, Lim found a love for acting, but her parents and relatives were not supportive of her desire to pursue it as a profession. Against the wishes of her family, she moved to the United Kingdom in 1961 at the age of 16 to study at the London School of Dramatic Art.

Her birth name was romanised Lim Phaik-Seng, but she changed her given name to "Pik-Sen" since her British friends would mispronounce "Phaik" as "fake".

== Career ==
In 1964, she appeared in the hospital drama series Emergency Ward 10, playing a nurse. There she met scriptwriter Don Houghton, whom she married in 1968. The couple's daughter, Sara Houghton (born 1971), is also an actress; the two women once portrayed a mother and daughter in the stage play Three Thousand Troubled Threads. Sara also appeared in a serial of Doctor Who spin-off The Sarah Jane Adventures called The Curse of Clyde Langer.

Lim appeared in the Don Houghton-scripted Doctor Who serial The Mind of Evil in 1971 as Chin Lee (a role she later reprised in an audiodrama from Big Finish Productions), and the first three seasons of the sitcom Mind Your Language speaking Penang Hokkien as her Chinese language. Here, she was obliged to speak in an exaggerated, stereotyped Chinese accent. Her later appearances are roles in the short lived soap operas Albion Market (1985) and Night and Day (2003), as well as Arabian Nights (2000), The Bill (2005), and as a character in the comedy series Little Britain (2004).

She is the narrator of the Dark Souls series of video games.

In 1966, she was invited to be Rye Fawkes at the Rye Bonfire celebrations. This involved being seated in a sedan chair, hoisted aloft and being carried down from the Landgate in Rye to the bonfire, where she was presented with a burning torch with which she set the bonfire alight.

In 2024, Lim voiced her final film role as the narrator of The Wedding Veil of the Proud Princess, a fantasy animated short film based on a passage from the fourth chapter of L.M. Montgomery's novel The Story Girl; the short film is dedicated to Lim's memory.

== Personal life ==
Lim married screenwriter Don Houghton in 1968. Their daughter, Sara Houghton, is also an actress. The couple divorced sometime in the 1980s.

=== Death ===
Lim died on 9 June 2025, at the age of 80.

== Filmography ==
=== Film ===
| Year | Title | Role | Notes |
|---|---|---|---|
| 1969 | The Gladiators | C-2 | |
| 1985 | Plenty | Madame Aung | |
| 2002 | Miranda | Mrs. Wang | |
| 2007 | Monkey Nut Tales | Grandma Wu | Short film |
| 2008 | Granny's Ghost | Granny | Short film |
| 2011 | Johnny English Reborn | Killer Cleaner | |
| 2012 | Healthy | Mother | Short film |
| 2014 | Balsa Wood | Bebing | Short film |
| 2016 | The Sea, the God, the Man | Grandmother | Short film |
| 2018 | Dim Sum | Nai Nai Chen | Short film |
| 2018 | The Crack | Film Developer | Short film |
| 2020 | British People | Linda | Short film |
| 2021 | I Am a Unicorn | Cynthia | Short film |
| 2024 | The Wedding Veil of the Proud Princess | Narrator (voice) | Short film |

=== Television ===
| Year | Title | Role | Notes |
|---|---|---|---|
| 1964 | Das Mädchen aus dem Dschungel | Amina | Miniseries; 3 episodes |
| 1964–67 | Emergency Ward 10 | Nurse Kwei-Kim Yen | Series regular |
| 1967 | Hugh and I | | Episode: "A Touch of the Rising Sun" |
| 1967 | Who is Sylvia? | | Episode: "The Man from C.L.U.N.K." |
| 1967 | Sorry I'm Single | Suzy | Series regular |
| 1970 | The Flaxton Boys | Su Ling | 3 episodes |
| 1971 | Doctor Who | Cpt. Chin Lee | Serial: "The Mind of Evil" (3 episodes) |
| 1972 | Madame Sin | Nikko | TV movie |
| 1972, 1975 | General Hospital | Prem. Unit Nurse, Rubia Mosley | 2 episodes |
| 1974 | Within These Walls | Sister Ling | 3 episodes |
| 1976 | The New Avengers | Sing | Episode: "The Midas Touch" |
| 1977–79 | Mind Your Language | Chung Su-Lee | Series regular |
| 1978–81 | Spearhead | Tsai Adams | Series regular |
| 1979 | Angels | Dr. Yeo | |
| 1980 | The Professionals | Chai Ling | "Take Away" |
| 1980 | Shoestring | Phone Girl | "Mocking Bird" |
| 1985 | Albion Market | Ly Nhu Chan | |
| 1996 | Cracker | Wei Wei | "White Ghost" |
| 1998 | London's Burning | Mrs. Lau | |
| 2000 | Arabian Nights | Aladdin's Mother | Mini-series |
| 2003 | Fortysomething | Chinese waitress | |
| 2004 | Little Britain | Simone | |
| 2005 | The Bill | Dora Sim | |
| 2006 | The Ruby in the Smoke | Madame Sheng | |
| 2010 | Spirit Warriors | Beggar Woman | |
| 2010 | Casualty | Reiko Reid | Episode "Clean Slate" |
| 2012 | A Civil Arrangement | Madam Rene | TV movie |
| 2013 | Holby City | Amy Cardle | "The Journey Home" |
| 2015 | Roald Dahl's Esio Trot | Mrs Wu | |
| 2015 | The Dumping Ground | PoPo | 1 episode: "Coming Round" |
| 2019 | This Way Up | Chien | |
| 2022 | Vampire Academy | The Queen | 9 episodes |
| 2023 | The Nevers | Madame Tam | 1 episode: "It's a Good Day" |

=== Video games ===
| Year | Title | Role | Notes |
|---|---|---|---|
| 2011 | Dark Souls | Narrator (voice) | |
| 2012 | Dark Souls: Artorias of the Abyss | Narrator (voice) | |
| 2016 | Dark Souls III | Narrator (voice) | |

== Theatre ==
| Year | Title | Role | Notes |
|---|---|---|---|
| 1964 | The Bacchae of Euripides | Chorus | |
| 2012 | The Sugar-Coated Bullets of the Bourgeoisie | Mrs Gao | Produced by Finborough Theatre. |
