= Iris Sadler =

English actress (1908–1991)

- Born: Iris Maud Sadler; 22 March 1908; Forest Gate, London, England
- Died: 12 January 1991 (aged 82); Wellingborough, Northamptonshire, England
- Television: Gladys in Mind Your Language

Iris Maud Sadler (22 March 1908 – 12 January 1991) was an English actress, best known for her role as Gladys the tea lady in the television sitcom Mind Your Language, from 1977 to 1979 in which she appeared in 20 episodes. Her film credits include Mrs. Brown, You’ve Got a Lovely Daughter (1968).
