= Tommy Godfrey =

English comedian and actor (1916–1984)

- Born: Thomas Frederick Godfrey; 20 June 1916; Lambeth, London, England
- Died: 24 June 1984 (aged 68); London, England
- Occupations: Comedian; actor
- Years active: 1949–1984

Thomas Frederick Godfrey (20 June 1916 – 24 June 1984) was an English comedian and actor who mostly played working-class Cockney characters.

== Life and career ==
He was born in London, and started his career as a tap dancer in variety shows, firstly with his sister and then as part of the act Godfrey, Randall and Deane. He then worked as a solo comedian, and often as a principal boy in pantomimes.

He made his film debut playing a bus conductor – a typical role – in Passport to Pimlico (1949). As a character actor, he continued to appear in occasional films in the 1950s and 1960s, but had his greatest period of success in the 1970s.

He appeared in several popular television sitcoms, including regular appearances in On the House (1970), Love Thy Neighbour (1972-1976), and Mind Your Language (1977-1979). His other television credits, in both comedic and serious roles, included The Saint, Special Branch, The Persuaders, The Avengers, Bless This House, Till Death Us Do Part, Z-Cars, Softly, Softly, The Goodies, Steptoe and Son, and Crown Court.

He died in London in 1984, aged 68.

== Filmography ==
- Passport to Pimlico (1949) – Bus Conductor
- The Flaw (1955) – Theatregoer (uncredited)
- Scotland Yard (film series) – The Grand Junction Case (1961) – Smaller
- The Missing Note (1961) – Sam
- Hide and Seek (1964) – Drunken party guest (uncredited)
- The Christmas Tree (1966) – Stranded Motorist (uncredited)
- Work Is a Four-Letter Word (1968) – Mr. Thacker
- If.... (1968) – School Porter (uncredited)
- Till Death Us Do Part (1969) – Knowledgeable man in pub
- Ring of Bright Water (1969) – Ticket Seller
- The Best House in London (1969) – News Vendor (uncredited)
- A Severed Head (1970) – Removal Man (uncredited)
- Simon, Simon (1970) – Cashier
- Straight On till Morning (1972) – Mr. Godfrey
- Bless This House (1972) – Alf Murray
- The Love Ban (1973) – Barber #2
- The Vault of Horror (1973) – Landlord (segment 5 "Drawn and Quartered")
- Love Thy Neighbour (1973) – Arthur
- From Beyond the Grave (1974) – Mr. Jeffries (segment 1 "The Gate Crasher")
- The Adventure of Sherlock Holmes' Smarter Brother (1975) – Fred
- Come Play with Me (1977) – Blitt
- Mind Your Language (1977–1979) – Sidney
- The Great Muppet Caper (1981) – Bus Conductor
