= Jill Gascoine =

English actress and novelist (1937–2020)

- Born: Jill Viola Gascoine; 11 April 1937; Lambeth, London, England
- Died: 28 April 2020 (aged 83); Los Angeles, California, U.S.
- Occupations: Actress, novelist
- Years active: 1958–2009
- Spouses: Bill Keith (m. 1965; div. 1972) Alfred Molina (m. 1986)
- Children: 2

Jill Viola Gascoine (11 April 1937 – 28 April 2020) was an English actress and novelist. Her credits include The Pure Hell of St Trinian's (1960), Z-Cars (1973), General Hospital (1974), Rooms (1974), Dixon of Dock Green (1974), Softly, Softly: Taskforce (1975), Within These Walls (1975), Confessions of a Pop Performer (1975), Peter Pan (1976), The Onedin Line (1976–1979), Home to Roost (1989–1990), King of the Wind (1990), Taggart (1990), and Boon (1991).

However, she is most notable for portraying the first ever female Detective Inspector as Maggie Forbes in the 1980s television series The Gentle Touch (1980-1984), and its spin-off series C.A.T.S. Eyes (1985-1987). In the 1990s, she gave up acting and became a novelist and published three books.

== Early life ==
Gascoine was born 11 April 1937, in Lambeth, the daughter of Francis Gascoine, a quantity surveyor, and his wife Irene, née Greenwood. She was sent to a boarding school, which she said she hated, explaining later that she was ridiculed by schoolteachers. After leaving school, in the 1950s, she went to the Edinburgh Festival Fringe to appear in a revue.

== Career ==
Early in her career in the 1950s, Gascoine was a soubrette in a Great Britain tour of the Crazy Gang Show. In 1956, she was a chorus dancer in the Christmas season of The Adventures of Davy Crockett starring Hermione Baddeley, at the Olympia Theatre, Dublin. Gascoine also worked alongside Victor Spinetti in a revue in the Irving Theatre, London. By 1959, Gascoine had taken over from Millicent Martin in a British tour of Expresso Bongo.

Although in her twenties, Gascoine played one of the schoolgirls in the film The Pure Hell of St Trinian's (1960). While in Dundee, she appeared in productions of the Downfield Musical Societ, and joined the Dundee Repertory Theatre in 1963.

From 1970 onwards, Gascoine began appearing on television in series such as Z-Cars, General Hospital, Rooms, Dixon of Dock Green, Softly, Softly: Taskforce, and Within These Walls. She had a part in the British sex-comedy Confessions of a Pop Performer (1975), and then had a main role playing Letty Gaunt in Series 4–7 of the BBC period drama The Onedin Line (1976–1979).

She became very notable in 1980 when she took the lead role playing British television's first female detective, as DI Maggie Forbes in the ITV drama series The Gentle Touch. She continued to play Maggie Forbes in the more action-oriented spin-off series C.A.T.S. Eyes (1985-1987). She then appeared as Judy Schwartz, alongside John Thaw, in the final series of the sitcom Home to Roost (1989–1990), She starred opposite Richard Harris and Glenda Jackson in the film King of the Wind (1990).

Further stage appearances included playing Dorothy Brock opposite Catherine Zeta-Jones in 42nd Street at the Theatre Royal Drury Lane in London and in the musical Destry playing Frenchie, the role played by Marlene Dietrich in Destry Rides Again.

After a high-profile career that had spanned over twenty years on British television, Gascoine and her second husband, actor Alfred Molina, moved to Los Angeles in the 1990s where she made appearances on US television in series such as Northern Exposure, and Touched by an Angel. Although still living in Los Angeles, she returned to the UK in 2008 to perform at the Edinburgh Festival Fringe in the play by Colette Freedman, Sister Cities at the Gilded Balloon Theatre.

In October 2009, it was announced that Gascoine was joining the BBC One soap opera EastEnders. She was to play the role of Glenda Mitchell, former wife of Archie Mitchell and mother of Ronnie and Roxy, from early 2010. However, during her first day on set, she withdrew from her filming commitments, as she felt that she "lacked the right experience to film such a big continuing drama", so was replaced by Glynis Barber.

== Novels ==
In the 1990s, Gascoine wrote her first novel about a successful television actress in her fifties who embarks on a destructive affair with a younger, half-English/half-Spanish actor in his thirties. Titled Addicted (1994), it is based on Gascoine's real-life second husband, Alfred Molina, an English actor of Italian/Spanish descent, who was 16 years her junior. Her second novel, titled Lilian (1995), is about a woman who begins a love affair while holidaying in California with her best friend. Her third novel, titled Just Like A Woman (1997), details the story of Daisy, a middle-aged woman who is being pressured by her family to have an abortion after she falls pregnant in her fifties.

== Personal life and death ==
Gascoine married twice. Her first husband was Dundee hotelier Bill Keith in 1965, with whom she had two sons. However, the marriage ended in 1972. Gascoine was then left to bring up her two sons alone and did not see Keith after they divorced. In 1982, she met actor Alfred Molina when they were both working in the same theatre production. They later married in Tower Hamlets, London, in 1986. Gascoine suffered from clinical depression for most of her life, which she believed stemmed from her unhappy time in a boarding school as a child. In 1997, Gascoine was diagnosed with kidney cancer, though the disease was detected early and she made a full recovery. In June 2013, Gascoine publicly revealed that she had Alzheimer's disease at a Beverly Hills gala which was set up to raise money to fight the disease. In August 2016 her husband Alfred Molina reported that she was "in a very advanced stage of Alzheimer's", and had been in a specialist care home in Los Angeles for more than two years, where she died on 28 April 2020, aged 83.

== Filmography ==
=== Film ===
Year	Title	Role	Notes
1959	The White Trap	Nurse	
1960	The Pure Hell of St Trinian's	St. Trinian's Girl	
1961	Nudist Memories	Narrator (voice)	Short
1975	Confessions of a Pop Performer	Mrs. Barnwell	
1990	King of the Wind	Mrs. Williams	
1993	Red Hot	Waitress	
1998	BASEketball	Hospital Nurse	
2007	TV Virus	Holly	
2007	After Midnight	Phyllis	Video

=== Television ===
Year	Title	Role	Notes
1958	Theatre Night	Ensemble	Episode: "Expresso Bongo"
1970	Dr. Finlay's Casebook	Marion Bradley	Episode: "A Good Prospect"
1973	Z-Cars	Lucy Manning	Episode: "Operation Watchdog"
1973	Late Night Theatre	Fred	Episode: "Three Card Trick"
1973	Six Days of Justice	Miss Owen	Episodes: "A Regular Friend", "Stranger in Paradise"
1973	Oranges & Lemons	Charlotte	Episode: "The Trigger"
1974	Dixon of Dock Green	Lorna McDermot	Episode: "The Unwanted"
1974	A Little Bit of Wisdom	Sister Ruth	Episode: "The Angels Want Me for a Sunbeam"
1974	Justice	Elizabeth Lee	Episode: "Growing Up"
1974	General Hospital	Michelle Hawkins	Episode: "1.177"
1975	Within These Walls	Irene	Episode: "Remand Wing"
1975	Softly, Softly: Task Force	Maggie Grant	Episode: "Grass"
1975	Prometheus: The Life of Balzac	Helene de Valette	Episode: "The Human Comedy"
1975	Beryl's Lot	Hilda Monks	Episode: "Safety First"
1976	Peter Pan	Wendy (adult)	TV film
1976	Plays for Britain	Marion	Episode: "Sunshine in Brixton"
1976–1979	The Onedin Line	Letty Onedin	Main role, 33 episodes
1977	Holding On	Betty	Episode: "1.4"
1977	Raffles	Dolly	Episode: "A Costume Piece"
1977	Rooms	Ruth Harris	TV series
1978	The Three Kisses	Mrs. Marigold	TV film
1980–1984	The Gentle Touch	Maggie Forbes	Main role, 56 episodes
1983	The Cannon and Ball Show	Ilsa	Episode: "The Cannon & Ball Easter Show"
1985–1987	C.A.T.S. Eyes	Maggie Forbes	Main role, 30 episodes
1989	Home to Roost	Judy Schwartz	Episode: "Bridge of Sighs"
1990	Taggart	Jane Antrobus	Episode: "Evil Eye: Part 1"
1991	El C.I.D.	Sarah	Episode: "Thursday's Child"
1991	Boon	Jo Beckett	Episode: "The Night Before Christmas"
1992	Virtual Murder	Victoria Fleming	Episode: "A Dream of Dracula"
1992	Screen One	Vivien Empson	Episode: "Trust Me"
1994	Northern Exposure	Lady Ann	Episode: "Shofar, So Good"
1998	The Patron Saint of Liars	Mother Corrine	TV film
1999	Touched by an Angel	Ms. Piper	Episode: "Voice of an Angel"
