= Mind Your Language =

British TV sitcom (1977–1979; 1985)

- Title screen of the series
- Genre: Sitcom
- Created by: Vince Powell
- Written by: Vince Powell
- Starring: Barry Evans; Dino Shafeek; Albert Moses; George Camiller; Kevork Malikyan; Ricardo Montez; Robert Lee; Françoise Pascal; Jamila Massey; Pik-Sen Lim; Jacki Harding; Anna Bergman; Gabor Vernon; Tommy Godfrey; Zara Nutley; Iris Sadler
- Composers: Max Harris (series 1–3); Kin Kelly (series 4)
- Country of origin: United Kingdom
- Original language: English
- No. of series: 4
- No. of episodes: 42 (list of episodes)

Production
- Executive producer: Bachu Patel (series 4)
- Producers: Stuart Allen (series 1–3); Albert Moses (series 4)
- Camera setup: Multiple-camera
- Running time: 25 minutes
- Production companies: London Weekend Television (series 1–3); TRI Films (series 4)

Original release
- Network: ITV
- Release: 30 December 1977 – 31 December 1985

Mind Your Language is a British sitcom that premiered on ITV in 1977. It was produced by London Weekend Television and directed by Stuart Allen. Three series were made by London Weekend Television between 1977 and 1979, and it was briefly revived in 1985 (or 1986 in most ITV regions) with six of the original cast members.

The series shows people of different countries with different social backgrounds, religions, and languages existing in the same classroom, learning English as a foreign language.

== Summary ==
The show is set in an adult education college in London and focuses on the class in ESL, taught by Jeremy Brown, who teaches a group of enrolled foreigners.

== Episodes ==
Series	Episodes	Originally released	
Series	Episodes	First released	Last released
1	13	30 December 1977	24 March 1978
2	8	7 October 1978	25 November 1978
3	8	27 October 1979	20 December 1979
4	13	30 September 1985	31 December 1985

== Cast and characters ==
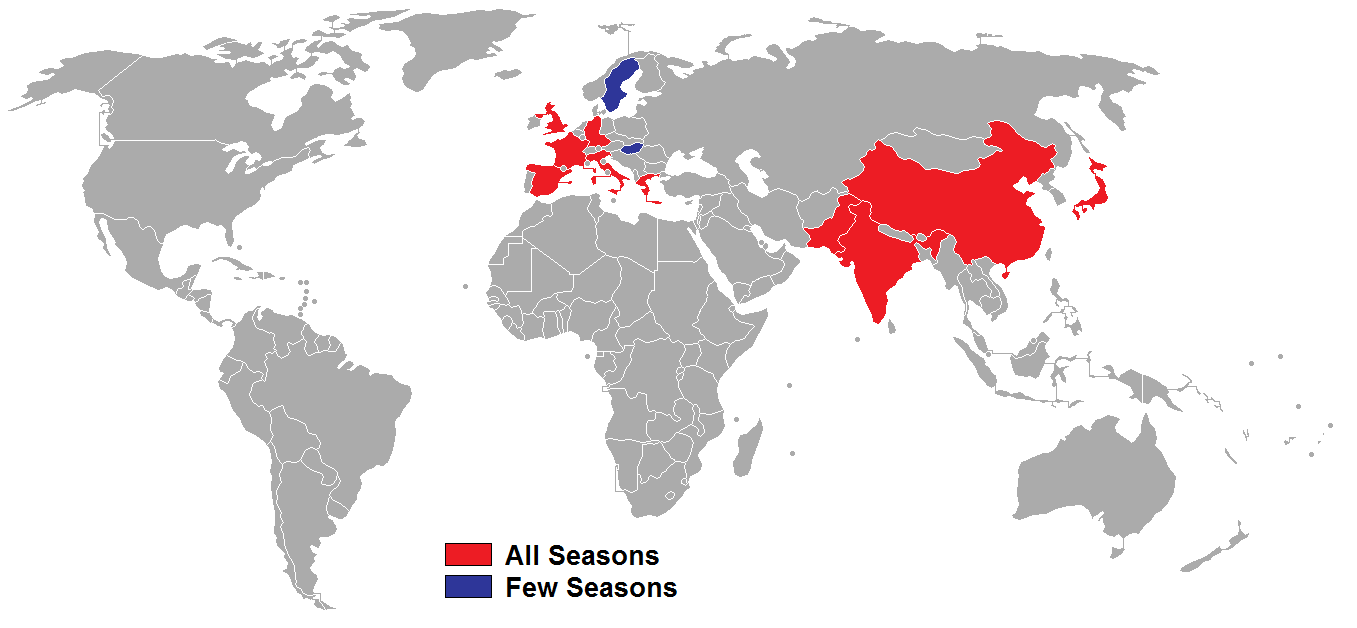
Countries represented in Mind Your Language (Series 1–3)

=== Series 1–3 ===
- Barry Evans (42 episodes) as Jeremy Brown, the ESL teacher and focal point of most of the series. He is a good-natured, earnest single man in his thirties who lives alone (apart from his Siamese cat Josephine, whom he mentions in "The Examination") and holds a Bachelor of Arts degree from the University of Oxford. He was hired in Series 1 Episode 1, Pilot, in which he was warned that the students drove the previous teacher insane. Mr Brown is up to the challenge but often exasperated by the students' creative interpretations of the English language.
- George Camiller (42 episodes) as Giovanni Cupello, a stereotypical Italian Catholic chef, the class's spokesman and de facto class monitor. He is best friends with Max, who becomes his flatmate. Giovanni's main problem with English is understanding metaphors and long words, although he often answers wrongly on purpose to amuse the class. He often calls Mr Brown Professore (teacher in Italian). When shocked or surprised, he often uses catchphrases like "Santa Maria", "Whoops ada Daisy", "Okey cokey", "Buona sera" or "Holy ravioli". He apologises by saying scusi, which is Italian for "I'm sorry". He has an elaborate set of first names: Giovanni Vincenzo Marco Dino Alberto Leonardo etc. His last name is sometimes spelled "Capello" (hair) in the closing credits.
- Kevork Malikyan (29 episodes) as Maximillian "Max" Andrea Archimedes Papandrious (Series 1–3), stereotypical Greek Orthodox shipping agency worker from Athens who is often paired with Giovanni. He, like Giovanni, is attracted to Danielle, but as the show progresses, the three become friends. Max tends to misunderstand metaphors and long words. An example of a mistake was when Mr Brown asked him to give a word beginning with the letter l and he said 'elephant' (from Hello Sailor - series 1, Episode 10). He also has a heavy accent, which causes him to add h to the beginning of almost every word that starts with a vowel sound. Later, he shares his flat with Giovanni, with whom he is close friends; these two characters have the best command of the English language of all the students in the series.
- Robert Lee (29 episodes) as Taro Nagazumi (Series 1–3), a Japanese electronics executive who works as a representative for the London branch of the fictional Japanese electronic company Bushido Electronics. He speaks English quite fluently, but has a habit of adding -o to almost every word he says (as in "thank-o," "England-o," and so on) and always replies "Ah so!" and bows whenever he is addressed. Early in the series he is at odds with Su-Lee due to Japan and China's own political differences in the 1970s but they become friends later on. Most of the time he is seen with his camera.
- Jamila Massey (29 episodes) as Jamila Ranjha (Series 1–3), a stereotypical Indian housewife from Shimla. When she first joins the class she barely speaks any English - she rants in Hindi when Mr Brown asks her name, and when she finally does understand, she writes her name on the blackboard in Urdu (جميلہ) because she cannot write it in English. Although she needs Ali to translate for her in Series 1, by Series 3 she shows a marked improvement and is able to communicate in English without needing any help. She often calls Mr Brown "Masterji" (Hindi roughly meaning "teacher" or "professor" with respect), and her catchphrase early in the series is "gud hefening" (her pronunciation of "good evening"). She often brings her knitting to class. She is shown to be a Christian in the episode "Guilty or Not Guilty", when she swears on the Bible to tell the truth. From "A Point of Honour" onward she wears a cross necklace, but in the same episode she suggests that Buddhism is the true religion when the students argue about it. Also, in the episode "I Belong to Glasgow", she crosses herself along with Juan, Danielle, Max and Giovanni.
- Pik-Sen Lim (27 episodes) as Chung Su-Lee (Series 1–3), a stereotypical Chinese communist woman who works as a secretary at the Chinese Embassy. She is almost never seen without her Little Red Book of Mao, from which she often quotes and constantly mixes up her r and l sounds. Early in the series, she had a fierce ideological rivalry with Taro, her Japanese classmate, but later in the series, he often rushes to her defence when a character insults her or China. When she quotes Chairman Mao, Mr Brown replies "That's his opinion."
- Ricardo Montez (42 episodes) as Juan Cervantes, a Spanish Catholic bartender with an optimistic outlook. Juan is always laughing at himself, confident of his answers even when they are completely wrong. Early in the series, Juan speaks almost no English (apart from "An Inspector Calls", where he describes Miss Courtney as "Plenty awesome, very good!") and answers everything with "Por favor?" (please), necessitating Giovanni to translate some key terms for him (as Spanish and Italian have many mutually intelligible words). Because of this, the two often get into arguments due to misunderstanding. His typical catchphrase is "S'all right!" and sometimes when he is corrected he says "Sorry" (pronounced /sɒrˈaɪ/ instead of /ˈsɒr.i/). Juan's English improves as the series goes on, but he remains one of the worst speakers, often speaking a mix of English and Spanish. He cares a great deal for Mr Brown; he often calls him 'Señor Brown' and considers almost as part of his family.
- Albert Moses (42 episodes) as Ranjeet Singh, an Indian London Underground employee from Punjab and a devout Sikh. In the first episode, Mr Brown mistook him for a Pakistani when he asked him to sit next to his "fellow countryman", Ali Nadim. He has a good vocabulary but tends to mix up his general knowledge, and upon being corrected he always puts his hands together and says "a thousand apologies". When angered, he threatens his tormenters with his kirpan. He usually comes late to class. In "A Fate Worse Than Death", a woman named Surinder appeared at the school and he told everyone that they had been betrothed to each other as children, but he no longer wished to marry her. He often clashes with Ali, but they become friends in the later episodes.
- Dino Shafeek (29 episodes) as Ali Nadim (Series 1–3), a Muslim from Lahore, Pakistan. Religious and cultural differences often bring him into conflict with Ranjeet. He is one of the most honest and hardworking students in the class, which sometimes gets Mr Brown and him into trouble. He used to work at the Taj Mahal Tandoori Restaurant in Putney, but is unemployed at the beginning of the series and later gets a job as a travelling salesman. He is married, and his wife Rehana appears in "Better to Have Loved and Lost" and "What a Tangled Web"; in the latter episode, they have had a child. His catchphrases are, "Yes, please." when being addressed, “Jolly good.” when something positive occurs or as an affirmative response, "Esqueeze me, please." (when he really means "Excuse me, please."), and "Oh, blimey!" when something wrong happens.
- Françoise Pascal (29 episodes) as Danielle Favre (Series 1–3), an amorous young French Catholic au pair who instantly grabs the attention of all the men, including Mr Brown. Her good looks often distract Giovanni and Max from their answers, while Mr Brown is often found in seemingly incriminating positions with her, and she is strongly attracted to him. She often makes sexual innuendos and regularly brings up the subject of love, even when irrelevant to the lesson. She is annoyed when Ingrid joins the class, instigating a rivalry for Mr Brown's attention.
- Jacki Harding (42 episodes) as Anna Schmidt, a stereotypical West German who works as an au pair. In her introduction, she refers to "German efficiency"; accordingly, she's a hardworking student, occasionally asking legitimate questions, and as the series progresses, answering Mr Brown's questions correctly. Her main problem is mixing v and w sounds. She also punctuates her sentences with German words. She is shown to have exceptional physical strength and she is never reluctant to show it, often punching fellow students (such as Max) if they try to flirt with her. In one episode, she says that Lutheranism was the true religion while the students are having an argument, but in the episode "How's Your Father" she says that there's no life after death.
- Anna Bergman (21 episodes) as Ingrid Svenson (Series 2, 4), a Swedish au pair who joins the class at the beginning of Series 2. She is attractive and straightforward about her attraction to Mr Brown, sparking a rivalry between her and Danielle. Her main problem with English is word order, often getting words mixed up, such as "you for I question answer". She transfers schools at the end of Series 2, but returns in the independently produced Series 4.
- Zara Nutley (42 episodes) as Dolores Courtney, the stuffy, imperious principal of the school. Miss Courtney has a great dislike of the male gender, thinks women are superior to men, and prefers female teachers. She is hesitant about employing Mr Brown, but reluctantly puts him on a month's trial. She likes to drop in at the English classroom unannounced to check up on the progress of Mr Brown's students, and often leaves disappointed. She nearly eloped with a man in her early years, but was caught and sent home by her father. However, it was revealed that she was only six years old at the time and the "man" was eight. Her first name was mentioned only in the episode "Brief Re-Encounter". She has a Master of Arts from Oxford.
- Iris Sadler (20 episodes) as Gladys (Series 1–3), the tea lady in the school cafeteria, most often referred to as "Gladys the tea lady". She is a vivacious, friendly woman in her seventies. In Series 3, it is revealed that she is a widow. She has a friendly relationship with both Sidney and Mr Brown. She often cajoles Mr Brown and tattles on Miss Courtney.
- Tommy Godfrey (20 episodes) as Sidney (Series 1–3), the school caretaker, a rough, roguish Cockney in his sixties who speaks in rhyming slang. Only Miss Courtney calls him by his full name; everyone else calls him Sid. He dislikes his long-term partner and wears a black tie on their anniversary. Despite not being married, he routinely refers to her as his wife. He is hard of hearing, which often creates misunderstandings. He is very fond of alcohol and tricks the students into buying drinks for him and giving him money. He also steals supplies from the school and sells them. He is friendly with both Mr Brown and Gladys.
- Gabor Vernon (8 episodes) as Zoltan Szabo (Series 2), a Hungarian man from Budapest. He hardly speaks any English, constantly saying "Bocsánat?" (Hungarian for "Pardon?") and nearly always relying on his phrase book to help him communicate, especially in the beginning. Juan and Giovanni teach him many slang expressions, but he remains the worst speaker in the class. He has an English girlfriend in "All Present If Not Correct", but she beats him up after he gives her an insulting letter that Mr Brown had intended to deliver to Miss Courtney. He is fond of music and magic tricks, implying that he works as an entertainer, and returns to Hungary after Series 2 ends.

=== Series 4 only ===
- Sue Bond (13 episodes) as Rita, Gladys' successor.
- Marie-Elise Grepne (13 episodes) as Michelle Dumas, a student from France.
- Jenny Lee-Wright (13 episodes) as Maria Papandrious, a student from Greece and the sister of Maximillian Papandrious.
- Harry Littlewood (13 episodes) as Mr. Henshawe, Sid's successor.
- Raj Patel (13 episodes) as Farrukh Azzam, a student from Pakistan.
- Vincent Wong (13 episodes) as Fu Wong Chang, a student from China.

=== Individual appearances ===
- Gyearbuor Asante as Roger Kenyon, inspector from the local education authority (Series 1, Episode 2).
- David King as "Ivan" or Ivan Ivanovich, captain in the Soviet Navy (Series 1, Episode 10)
- Ray Marioni as "Boris" or Boris Borisovich, wayward sailor in the Soviet Navy and defector (Series 1, Episode 10)
- Deirdre Costello as Mavis, barmaid at the Red Lion Pub (Series 1, Episodes 12–13)

== Production ==
=== Development ===
The series was commissioned by Michael Grade, Director of Programmes at London Weekend Television.

The majority of recordings for the first three series took place on Tuesday evenings in Studio Two at the South Bank Television Centre while Series 4 was filmed at Uxbridge Technical College in Middlesex.

Using this series as an example, Sarita Malik, in Representing Black Britain (2002) wrote that "Blacks, Asians or 'race' were usually the butt of the joke", which "tended to hit a racist note, but always in a well-meaning, benevolent tone". She continued that "never before had so many diverse races... been seen in the same television frame, but they had never clung so tightly to their popular crude national stereotypes."

The series attracted about 18 million viewers. Grade cancelled the programme having considered the stereotyping offensive. "It was really irresponsible of us to put it out", he told Linda Agran at the Edinburgh Television Festival in 1985.

=== International screenings ===
The series was sold to Pakistan, Australia, New Zealand, Sri Lanka, India, Malaysia, Kenya, Nigeria, Ghana, Singapore, Persian Gulf states and Hong Kong. It was also one of the first British TV programmes shown in South Africa after the end of the boycott by the British Actors' Equity Association. It was also broadcast in Canada on CBC Television from 1979 until 1982. The series broadcast on PBS stations across the United States from 1985 until 1987. The show was also broadcast on South Pacific Television in New Zealand, and on Seven Network in Australia. In comments released in 2005, film historian Jonathan Rigby said the series was still screened internationally, particularly in the countries represented in the series onscreen.

== DVD releases ==
The series was released as a "Best of" four-disc box set on Region 2 DVD in 2003 (Cinema Club), and on Region 1 DVD in 2004 (Granada). However, these sets exclude the Series 1 episode "Kill or Cure", the Series 2 episode "Don't Forget the Driver", the Series 3 episode "Guilty or Not Guilty?" and all of Series 4.

Another four-DVD box set, The Complete LWT Series, released by Network in November 2007 contains all episodes of Series 1–3.

Series 4 has never been released on either DVD or in any streaming format.

== International remakes ==
International television shows based on the premise of Mind Your Language include:

- India: Zabaan Sambhalke and Zaban Sambhal Ke (in Hindi)
- Indonesia: Kelas Internasional (in Indonesian)
- Japan: 日本人の知らない日本語 (Nihonjin no Shiranai Nihongo; in Japanese)
- Jordan: العلم نور (al-ʿilm nūr; in Arabic)
- Kenya: Classmates
- Malaysia: Cakap Melayu Lah (In Malay) and Oh My English! (in English)
- Malta: Klassi Għalina (in Maltese)
- Nigeria: Second Chance! (in English), and Jami'ar Albarkawa (in Hausa)
- South Korea: So Not Worth It (in Korean)
- Sri Lanka: Raja Kaduwa! (in Sinhala)
- United States: A 1981 episode of sitcom Diff'rent Strokes titled "Almost American" served as a backdoor pilot for an American adaptation, with the regular Diff'rent Strokes cast only appearing briefly at the beginning and end of the episode. The series was not picked up. Later in 1986, Mind Your Language was adapted as What a Country!

== Criticism ==
David Aaronovitch notes that even Michael Grade, the commissioner of the series, regrets that Mind Your Language was ever broadcast:

In 1979, BBC2's Open Door carried a scathing critique of TV tolerance of racial stereotypes and its contribution to negative perceptions of immigrants. It was titled It Ain't Half Racist, Mum and it's a shocker. Google it. The excerpts from IAHHM are bad enough, but those from the ITV sitcom Mind Your Language, in which an Asian character loafs happily on the dole while two families of his relatives inhabit his one room, are simply appalling. The Open Doors documentary showed the executive responsible defending the programme as conducive to racial harmony. Six years later its commissioner, Michael Grade, admitted it should never have been aired. At its peak 18 million viewers watched it.
