= Mantovani discography =

The discography of Italian British conductor Mantovani comprises over a hundred albums and many singles.

== Studio albums ==
- A Mantovani Program, London LPB-127, 1949
- Musical Moments, London LPB-218, 1950
- Waltzing with Mantovani, London LPB-381, 1951
- An Album of Favourite Waltzes, London LL-570, 1952
- Strauss Waltzes, London LL 685, 1953, later re-recorded in stereo as London 118, 1958
- The Music of Victor Herbert, London LL 746, 1953
- An Album of Favorite Melodies, reissued as An Enchanted Evening with Mantovani, London LL 766, 1953
- Plays Tangos, London LL 768, 1953
- An Album of Romantic Melodies, London LL 979, 1954
- Plays the Music of Sigmund Romberg, London LL 1031, 1954
- Song Hits from Theatreland, London LL 1219, 1955, later re-recorded in stereo as London 125, 1959
- Plays the Music of Rudolf Friml, London LL 1150, 1955
- Plays the Immortal Classics, London LL 877, 1956
- Music from the Films, London 112
- Waltz Encores, London 119
- Film Encores, London 124, 1957
- Gems Forever, London 106, 1958
- Continental Encores, London 147, 1959
- Film Encores, Vol. 2, London 164, 1959
- The Music of Victor Herbert and Sigmund Romberg, London 165, 1960
- The Music of Irving Berlin and Rudolf Friml, London 166, 1956
- American Scene, London 182, 1959
- All-American Showcase, London LL 3122/3, 1959
- Songs to Remember, London 193, 1960
- Mantovani Plays Music from Exodus and Other Great Themes, LL 3231, 1960
- Great Theme Music (Music from "Exodus"), London 224, 1961
- Theme from "Carnival", London 3250, 1961
- Themes from Broadway, London 242
- American Waltzes, London 248, 1962
- Moon River, London 249, 1962
- Selections from "Stop the World – I Want to Get Off" and "Oliver", London 270
- Latin Rendezvous, London 295, 1963
- Manhattan, London 328, 1963
- Folk Songs Around the World, London 360
- The Incomparable Mantovani, London 392
- The Mantovani Sound, London 419, 1965
- Mantovani Olé, London 422
- Mantovani Magic, London 448, 1966
- Mantovani's Golden Hits, London 483, 1967
- Mr. Music, London 474, 1966
- Mantovani/Hollywood, London 516
- The Mantovani Touch, London 526, 1968
- Mantovani/Tango, London 532
- Mantovani ... Memories, London 542
- The Mantovani Scene, London 548, 1969

External audio
- You may hear Annunzio Montovani's recording The World of Mantovani Vol. 2 with the Montovani Orchestra in 1971 Here on archive.org

- The World of Mantovani, London 565, 1969
- Mantovani Today, London 572, 1970
- From Monty with Love, London 585–586, 1971
- To Lovers Everywhere, London PS 598, 1971
- Annunzio Paolo Mantovani, London XPS 610, 1972
- An Evening with Mantovani, London 902, 1973
- The Greatest Gift Is Love, London 913, 1975
- Mantovani Magic, K-tel, NA603
- Mantovani's Hit Parade , London 1966

=== Light classical music ===
- Strauss Waltzes, London LL 685, 1953

External audio
- You may hear Annunzio Montovani's recording Strauss Waltzes with the Montovani Orchestra in 1958 Here on archive.org

- Strauss Waltzes, London PS 118, 1958
- Concert Encores, London 133
- Operetta Memories, London 202
- Italia Mia, London 232, 1961
- Classical Encores, London 269
- The World's Great Love Songs, London 280
- Mantovani in Concert, London 578

=== Christmas music ===
- Christmas Carols (mono), London LL 913, 1953
- Christmas Carols (stereo), London PS 142, 1958
- Christmas Greetings from Mantovani and His Orchestra, London LL 3338 (mono) / PS 338 (stereo), 1963

== Compilation albums ==
- Mantovani Stereo Showcase, London SS 1 / MS 5, 1959

== Singles ==
Year	Single (A-side, B-side) Both sides from same album except where indicated	Country (UK and/or US)	Chart positions			Album
Year	Single (A-side, B-side) Both sides from same album except where indicated	Country (UK and/or US)	US	US AC	UK	Album
1951	"Bees in the Bonnet" b/w "Carriage and Pair"	UK	—	—	—	Non-album tracks
1951	"Wyoming (Go to Sleep My Baby)" b/w "Under the Roofs of Paris"	US	—	—	—	Waltz Time
1951	"For You" b/w "Kisses in the Dark"	UK & US	—	—	—	Waltz Time
1951	"Diane" b/w "Babette"	UK & US	—	—	—	Waltz Time
1951	"Charmaine" b/w "Just for a While"	UK & US	10	—	—	Waltz Time
1951	"At Dawning" b/w "I Love You Truly"	UK & US	—	—	—	A Collection Of Favorite Waltzes
1952	"Lovely Lady" b/w "Mexicali Rose"	UK	—	—	—	A Collection Of Favorite Waltzes
1952	"Dancing With Tears in My Eyes" b/w "Dear Love, My Love"	UK & US	26	—	—	A Collection Of Favorite Waltzes
1952	"Love, Here Is My Heart" b/w "Moonlight Madonna"	UK & US	—	—	—	A Collection Of Favorite Waltzes
1952	"It Happened in Monterey" b/w "Was It a Dream"	US	—	—	—	A Collection Of Favorite Waltzes
1952	"Faith" b/w "Symphony"	UK & US	—	—	—	An Enchanted Evening With Mantovani & His Orchestra
1952	"The Agnes Waltz" b/w "Die Schonbrunner"	UK	—	—	—	An Enchanted Evening With Mantovani & His Orchestra
1952	"Some Enchanted Evening" b/w "Gypsy Love Waltz" (from The Music Of Victor Herbert)	US & UK	—	—	—	An Enchanted Evening With Mantovani & His Orchestra
1952	"La Cumparsita" b/w "Tango De La Luna"	UK	—	—	—	Mantovani Plays Tangos
1952	"Tales from the Vienna Woods" b/w "Morning Papers"	US	—	—	—	Strauss Waltzes
1952	"Blue Danube" b/w "Roses From the South"	UK	—	—	—	Strauss Waltzes
1952	"White Christmas" b/w "Adeste Fideles"	UK & US	—	—	6	Christmas Carols
1953	"Gypsy Legend" b/w "Czardas" (from An Enchanted Evening with Mantovani)	UK	—	—	—	Non-album track
1953	"Vienna Blood" b/w "You and You" (from Strauss Waltzes)	US	—	—	—	Non-album track
1953	"Voices of Spring" b/w "Artist's Life" (Non-album track)	US	—	—	—	Strauss Waltzes
1953	"Ah, Sweet Mystery of Life" b/w "A Kiss In The Dark"	UK & US	—	—	—	The Music of Victor Herbert
1953	"Love's Dream After the Ball" b/w "Red Petticoats" (from Mantovani Plays Tangos)	US	—	—	—	An Enchanted Evening With Mantovani & His Orchestra
1953	"Sweethearts" b/w "I'm Falling in Love With Someone"	US	—	—	—	The Music Of Victor Herbert
1953	"Theme From 'The Last Rhapsody'" b/w "Nalia Waltz (Pas Des Fleurs)"; Both tracks with Stanley Black	US	—	—	—	Non-album tracks
1953	"Moulin Rouge Theme" b/w "Vola Colomba"	UK & US	8	—	1	Romantic Melodies
1953	"Royal Blue Waltz" b/w "Queen Elizabeth Waltz" (from Waltz Time)	UK & US	—	—	—	Romantic Melodies
1953	"Ramona" b/w "Chiquita Mia" (from Mantovani Plays Tangos)	UK & US	—	—	—	Romantic Melodies
1953	"Prelude in C Sharp Minor" b/w "Simple Aveu"	US	—	—	—	Mantovani Plays the Immortal Classics
1954	"Cara Mia"; UK B: "Love, Tears and Kisses" (Non-album track); US B: "How, When Or Where"; All sides with David Whitfield	UK & US	—	—	1	Cara Mia
1954	"Swedish Rhapsody" b/w "Jamaican Rhumba"	UK & US	—	—	2	Romantic Melodies
1954	"Luxembourg Polka" b/w "Music Box Tango"	UK	—	—	—	Romantic Melodies
1954	"Shadow Waltz" b/w "Moonlight Serenade"	UK	—	—	—	Romantic Melodies
1954	"Bewitched" b/w "Dream Dream Dream" (from Musical Modes)	UK & US	—	—	—	Song Hits From Theatreland
1954	"Lonely Ballerina"; UK B:"Lazy Gondolier"; US B: "You Stepped Out of a Dream" (from Candlelight)	UK & US	—	—	16	Musical Modes
1955	"We'll Gather Lilacs" b/w "Come Back to Me" (Non-album track)	UK	—	—	—	Romantic Melodies
1955	"Softly, Softly" b/w "Longing" (from Candlelight)	UK	—	—	—	Non-album track
1955	"Lazy Gondolier" b/w "Longing" (from Candlelight)	US	—	—	—	Musical Modes
1955	"Our Dream Waltz"; UK B: "Ma Chere Amie" (from Musical Modes; US B: "Begin The Beguine" (from Musical Modes)	UK & US	—	—	—	Waltz Time
1955	"Beyond the Stars" b/w "Open Your Heart"; Both sides with David Whitfield	UK & US	—	—	8	Cara Mia
1955	"Stranger in Paradise" b/w "The Deserted Ballroom" (from Musical Modes)	UK	—	—	—	Song Hits From Theatreland
1955	"Intermezzo" b/w "Edelma"	UK	—	—	—	Musical Modes
1955	"When You Lose the One You Love" b/w "Angelus"; Both sides with David Whitfield	UK & US	—	—	7	Cara Mia
1956	"Spring in Montmarte"; UK B: "Heart of Paris"; US B: "Candlelight"	UK & US	—	—	—	Candlelight
1956	"Candlelight" b/w "Begin the Beguine" (from Musical Modes)	UK	—	—	—	Candlelight
1956	"Song of Sorrento"; UK B: "Blue Fantasy"; US B: "Valse Campestre" (Non-album track)	UK & US	—	—	—	Candlelight
1956	"Toy Shop Ballet" b/w "Temple of Dreams"	UK	—	—	—	Non-album tracks
1957	"Around the World"; UK B: "The Heart of Budapest" (from Gypsy Soul); US B: "The Road To Ballingarry" (Non-album track)	UK & US	12	—	20	Film Encores, Vol. 2
1957	"Mandolin Serenade" b/w "The Spring Song"	UK				Non-album tracks
1957	"Let Me Be Loved"; UK B: "The Road to Ballingarry"; US B: "Call Of The West"	UK & US	—	—	—	Non-album tracks
1957	"Souvenir D'italie" b/w "Dream Dust"	UK	—	—	—	Non-album tracks
1958	"Story of Three Loves" b/w "To My Love" (Non-album track)	US	—	—	—	Music From The Films
1958	"Cry My Heart" (with David Whitfield) b/w "Dream Dust"	US	—	—	—	Non-album tracks
1958	"Love Song from 'Houseboat""; UK B: "A Certain Smile" (from Film Encores, Vol. 2); US B: "Almost In Your Arms" (with Vera Lynn)	UK & US	—	—	—	Non-album tracks
1958	"To My Love" b/w "The Canary"	UK	—	—	—	Non-album tracks
1958	"Tulips from Amsterdam" b/w "Only Yesterday" (Non-album track)	US	—	—	—	Strictly Mantovani
1958	"Come Prima" b/w "The Canary" (Non-album track)	US	—	—	—	Continental Encores
1958	"I Could Have Danced All Night" b/w "This Nearly Was Mine"	UK	—	—	—	Gems Forever
1959	"Under Paris Skies"; UK B: "Only Yesterday" (Non-album track); US B: "Separate Tables" (from Film Encores, Vol. 2)	UK & US	—	—	—	Continental Encores
1959	"Fascination" b/w "Separate Tables"	UK	—	—	—	Film Encores, Vol. 2
1959	"Summertime" b/w "This Nearly Was Mine"	US	—	—	—	Gems Forever
1959	"Camptown Races" b/w "Ring De Banjo"	US	—	—	—	The American Scene
1960	"The Orange Vendor" b/w "In The Spring" (Non-album track)	UK	—	—	—	Mantovani Tango
1960	"Song Without End"; UK B: "Tania" (Non-album track); US B: "In The Spring" (Non-album track)	UK & US	—	—	—	Great Theme Music
1960	"The Green Leaves of Summer" b/w "The Party's Over" (from Strictly Mantovani)	UK	—	—	—	Great Theme Music
1960	"Theme from 'The Sundowners'" b/w "Mine Alone" (Non-album track)	US	93	—	—	Great Theme Music
1960	"Irma La Douce" b/w "The Count of Luxembourg Waltz" (from Operetta Memories)	US	—	—	—	Great Theme Music
1960	"Main Theme from 'Exodus'" b/w "Karen"	UK & US	31	—	—	Great Theme Music
1961	"Theme from 'The Valiant Years'"; UK B: '"The Sound of Music" (from Great Theme Music); US B: "Non Dimenticar"	UK & US	—	—	—	Non-album tracks
1961	"Theme from 'Rocco and His Brothers'" b/w "Greengage Summer" (Non-album track)	US	—	—	—	Moon River and Other Great Film Themes
1961	"Moon River" b/w "Sail Away" (Non-album track)	US	—	—	—	Moon River and Other Great Film Themes
1962	"Fanny" b/w "Nadya's Theme from 'Rocco and His Brothers'"	UK	—	—	—	Moon River and Other Great Film Themes
1962	"Theme from 'Barabbas'" b/w "Far Away" (Non-album track)	UK	—	—	—	Moon River and Other Great Film Themes
1962	"Theme from 'Advise and Consent"" b/w "Let Me Call You Sweetheart" (from American Waltzes)	US	—	—	—	Moon River and Other Great Film Themes
1962	"What Kind of Fool Am I?" b/w "Someone Nice Like You"	US	—	—	—	Stop the World I Want to Get Off / Oliver
1962	"Summer Night" b/w "Rickshaw"	UK	—	—	—	Non-album tracks
1962	"Love Song From 'Mutiny on the Bounty'" b/w "Theme from 'Mutiny on the Bounty'"	UK	—	—	—	Non-album tracks
1963	"A Girl Named Tamiko" b/w "Taras Bulba"	UK	—	—	—	Non-album tracks
1963	"Take the 'A' Train" b/w "The Bowery"	US				Manhattan
1964	"Charade" b/w "The Fall of Love" (Non-album track)	UK	—	—	—	The Mantovani Sound-Big Hits From; Broadway and Hollywood
1964	"I Left My Heart in San Francisco" b/w "Return to Peyton Place" (from Moon River and Other Great Film Themes)	UK	—	—	—	The Incomparable Mantovani
1966	"Yesterday" b/w "Paris Lullaby" (Non-album track)	US	—	—	—	Mr. Music
1966	"Games That Lovers Play"; UK B: "Somewhere My Love" (Non-album track); US B: "Ebb Tide" (from Mr. Music)	UK & US	122	—	—	Mantovani's Golden Hits
1967	"You Only Live Twice" b/w "Puppet on a String" (from The Mantovani Touch)	UK	—	—	—	Hollywood
1968	"Theme from 'Villa Rides'" b/w "Willow Tree" (Non-album track)	UK & US	—	36	—	Gypsy Soul
1969	"Chitty Chitty Bang Bang" b/w "Come September"	US	—	—	—	The Mantovani Scene
1971	"Theme from Love Story"; UK B: "Gwendolyne"; US B: "Loss Of Love"	UK & US	—	—	—	From Monty, With Love
1971	"All Of a Sudden" b/w "Winter World Of Love"	US	—	—	—	To Lovers Everywhere
1973	"Upstairs Downstairs" b/w "Theme for a Western" (from Annunzio Paolo Mantovani)	UK	—	—	—	An Evening With Mantovani
"—" denotes releases that did not chart or were not released to that territory
