= Charmaine (song) =

Song popular in the 1920s and 1950s

Single by The Bachelors
- Released: January 26, 1963
- Recorded: October 10, 1962
- Label: Decca F11559
- Songwriters: Ernö Rapée, Lew Pollack
- Producer: Shel Talmy

The Bachelors singles chronology
"Charmaine" (1963)	"Far Away Places" (1963)

External audio
- You may hear "Charmaine" performed by Annunzio Mantovani conducting the Mantovani Orchestra in 1971 Here on archive.org

"Charmaine" is a popular song written by Ernö Rapée and Lew Pollack. The song was written in 1926 and published in 1927. However, Desmond Carrington on his BBC Radio 2 programme marked the song as having been written in 1913.

== Background ==
The song was originally in waltz time, but later versions were in common time. "Charmaine" is one of many popular songs whose lyrics use a "bluebird of happiness" as a symbol of cheer: "I wonder, when bluebirds are mating, will you come back again?" The song was originally composed for the 1926 silent film What Price Glory?

== Recordings ==
- The best-selling version was recorded by Guy Lombardo & his Orchestra.
- A version recorded by the Harry James orchestra in 1944 featured in the movie Two Girls and a Sailor.
- The 1951 instrumental arrangement by Ronald Binge, performed by the Mantovani orchestra with Max Jaffa as its leader and soloist, was Mantovani's first hit in the United States. Binge's "cascading strings" arrangement, using closely overlapping string parts that create an echo effect, became a trademark sound for future Mantovani arrangements. The recording was released by London Records as catalog number 1020. It first reached the Billboard chart on November 9, 1951, where it remained for 19 weeks, peaking at number 10.
- Another recording, by Gordon Jenkins' orchestra, with a vocal by Bob Carroll, also charted in 1951. This recording was released by Decca Records as catalog number 27859. It first reached the Billboard magazine charts on December 7, 1951 and lasted 1 week on the chart, at number 26.
- Lucienne Delyle recorded a version in 1952 with French lyrics.
- A 1952 arrangement of "Charmaine" by Billy May and His Orchestra reached number 17 on the Billboard charts. The single was May's biggest hit under his own name.
- Shel Talmy produced the Bachelors' 1963 version with Big Jim Sullivan on lead guitar and Jimmy Page on guitar. It was their first big hit in the UK, reaching number 6 on the charts.

== Recorded versions ==
- Jimmy Arnold
- The Bachelors (recorded October 10, 1962)
- Tex Beneke
- Max Bygraves
- Frankie Carle & His Girlfriends (1944)
- Vic Damone (1962)
- Billy Daniels
- Tommy Dorsey & Orchestra
- Gracie Fields
- The Four Freshmen
- The Four Knights
- The Four Preps
- Erroll Garner
- Bill Haley & His Comets (1958)
- The Harmonicats (instrumental) (1951)
- The Ink Spots
- Harry James & His Orchestra (1944)
- Lewis James (1927)
- Gordon Jenkins & His Orchestra (vocal: Bob Carroll) (1951)
- Sammy Kaye
- Lester Lanin & Orchestra
- James Last
- Layton & Johnstone
- Michel Legrand
- Julia Lee
- Josef Locke
- Guy Lombardo & His Royal Canadians (vocal: Carmen Lombardo) (recorded June 13, 1927)
- Jimmie Lunceford & Orchestra
- Mantovani & His Orchestra (1951) (recorded again in stereo in 1958; the stereo version is the most played version)
- Billy May & His Orchestra (instrumental) (1952)
- Moms & Dads
- Vaughn Monroe & His Orchestra (recorded October 27, 1951)
- Ed Bogas (1975; from the soundtrack to the film One Flew Over the Cuckoo's Nest)
- Lou Rawls (1965)
- Jim Reeves (1958)
- Dorothy Ashby covered the song in 1958 on Hip Harp
- Victor Silvester; his version was used as the title music for Dinner for One
- Frank Sinatra (recorded January 15, 1962)
- Ethel Smith
- Cyril Stapleton & Orchestra
- Hank Thompson
- Arthur Tracy
- Paul Weston & His Orchestra (vocal: The Norman Luboff Choir) (recorded November 4, 1951)
- Jackie Gleason & His Orchestra (1955)
- Gunnar Wiklund with Marcus Österdahl's orchestra. Swedish lyrics by Karl-Ewert also entitled "Charmaine". Recorded in Stockholm in 1967 and released on the single His Master's Voice EG 8698 on November 20, 1967.
- Burnie Peacock and his orchestra (King Records, 1951)
- The Ray-O-Vacs released an up-tempo rhythm and blues version of the song in 1951 on Decca Records.

== In popular culture ==
- The song appears in the background in the 1950 film Sunset Boulevard during Norma Desmond's house party. It also appears in the background in the 1978 film Just a Gigolo during a dance at the brothel run by the Baroness von Semering (Marlene Dietrich).
- The Mantovani score of "Charmaine" was also used in Tony Hancock's Hancock's Half Hour in the episode "The First Night Party" in 1953, played whilst introducing the guests to a palatial home Sidney James discovered. It also appeared in the series six episode "The Childhood Sweetheart" as Hancock approaches his childhood girlfriend for the first time since school.
- The version of "Charmaine" by the Mantovani Orchestra (the 1958 stereo recording) is used quite often in comedy to provide comedic effect whenever a romantic situation is created. In Monty Python's Flying Circus, for example, the tune has been used at least twice: in the Seduced Milkmen sketch from the first series, and in the third series, scored to scenes where footballers who celebrate a goal start to kiss and embrace each other in a homosexual way.
- A version by Victor Silvester And His Ballroom Orchestra is played during the opening and closing titles of the 1963 NDR production of the sketch Der 90. Geburtstag (Dinner For One) with Freddy Frinton and May Warden, which has long since become a staple of German popular culture, being rerun there on TV every New Year's Eve since the 1970s.
- It is used in the 1967 film Thoroughly Modern Millie at the Long Island fancy dress party when the eccentric widow Muzzy Van Hossmere (Carol Channing) is introducing all of her "instructors" who also happen to be former lovers. The song is a recurring theme in the movie when referring to Millie Dillmount's (Julie Andrews) love life or lack thereof.
- The song is featured in the horror film The Abominable Dr. Phibes (1971), during a murder scene.
- In the film One Flew Over the Cuckoo's Nest (1975) the tune is constantly played as background music in the mental institution. The same 1951/1958 arrangement by Mantovani is used for "institutional" effect in Frank Darabont's 1999 film The Green Mile, in which it is heard as background music in the retirement home.
- It can be heard during an early scene of 2011 film This Must Be The Place as the character played by Sean Penn is seen strolling through a supermarket.
- It is used as background music in the "waiting room" of the Alton Towers scare maze The Sanctuary.
- The B.F. Goodrich Silvertown Cord Orchestra version of the song was used in the film Race For Your Life, Charlie Brown (1977) when Peppermint Patty plays a record, remarking to Charlie Brown, "I don't suppose you even know what a waltz is, do you?"
- It was used in Part 10 of Twin Peaks: The Return (2017).
- It appears on the soundtrack of the movie The Rum Diary (2011).
