= BBC Radio 4 UK Theme =

Theme music formerly used by BBC Radio 4

- by Trad. Arr. by Fritz Spiegl & Manfred Arlan
- Composed: 1978:
- www.bbc.co.uk/radio4/history/uk_theme.shtml

The BBC Radio 4 UK Theme is an orchestral arrangement of traditional British and Irish airs compiled by Fritz Spiegl and arranged by Manfred Arlan. It was played every morning on BBC Radio 4 between 23 November 1978 and 23 April 2006.

The piece was used as the signature theme to introduce the daily beginning of Radio 4's broadcasting following the early morning handover from the BBC World Service. The theme was immediately followed by the Shipping Forecast. In 2006, the decision by Mark Damazer (Controller of Radio 4 at the time) to drop the Radio 4 UK Theme to make way for a "pacy news briefing" caused much controversy in the United Kingdom, including extensive discussion in the British media and even in Parliament.

Austrian-born Spiegl moved to the UK as a refugee in 1939, after his parents fled Nazi persecution of Jews after the Anschluss. He had contributed several pieces of music to the BBC, including a theme for Radio 4 based on a children's skipping rhyme introduced in 1973 (called A Skipping Tune), which was replaced by the Radio 4 UK Theme.

== Context and usage ==
The UK Theme was created in 1978 at the suggestion of Ian McIntyre, the then-new controller of Radio 4. (BBC press releases, when it was cut, wrongly stated 1973.)

McIntyre commissioned Fritz Spiegl to produce an arrangement of traditional British and Irish melodies to signify Radio 4 as a service which, from its move from medium wave to 1500 metres/200 kiloHertz long wave on 23 November 1978, would for the first time broadcast a unified service to the whole United Kingdom. Radio 4 had inherited regional opt-outs from the BBC Home Service in 1967, when the "Home", the "Light" and the "Third" were rebranded as Radio 4, Radio 2 and Radio 3 respectively to make way for the then-new BBC Radio 1.

The piece was recorded in 1978 by the BBC Northern Symphony Orchestra. The original recording was 5 minutes, 45 seconds and did not include 'Greensleeves/Drunken Sailor', having instead a longer and slower 'Londonderry Air/Annie Laurie' section, with the two pieces played separately before being combined. By 1990, the more familiar five-minute arrangement was in use, lasting until 2006.

The time at which the piece was played varied according to the time Radio 4 began broadcasting, which became gradually earlier in the morning over the years. Initially it was played at approximately 5:54 am on weekdays (starting from Thursday 23 November 1978), before the first programme of the day (News Briefing) began at 6:00 am. At weekends it was played later than this (Saturday programmes in November 1978 starting at 6:30 am and Sunday programmes at 7:15 am). With the extension of the Today Programme to start at 6:00 am, the Shipping Forecast and the UK Theme with it were broadcast earlier. Towards the end of the UK Theme's life it was played at 5:30 am every day, when Radio 4 took over from the BBC World Service, which has provided overnight programming on Radio 4's radio frequency for some years.

The actual premiere of the Theme was at approximately 9:07 pm on Monday 20 November 1978, when it was played to fill a lengthy gap in the schedule and to familiarise listeners with the imminent frequency change.

In 2006 the Controller of Radio 4, Mark Damazer, announced that he was cancelling the broadcast. The decision caused much controversy, and even debate in Parliament, but protests did not succeed. The last regular broadcast of the UK Theme was at 5.30 am on Sunday 23 April 2006.

It was played in full at the end of Radio 4's PM programme on 11 December 2019.

== Description ==
The Theme is a collection of traditional British and Irish folk tunes representing the four home countries of the United Kingdom and the national maritime tradition.

- The piece opens with the first few bars of "Early One Morning" (English, horns and trombones), before the main theme of "Rule, Britannia!" (British, woodwind and strings) is played.
- In the second section, the mood changes as "A Londonderry Air" (Northern Irish, cor anglais and harp) combined with "Annie Laurie" (Scottish, violin) are played at a slower tempo.
- The faster third section begins with "What Shall We Do with the Drunken Sailor?" (Royal Navy, piccolo) combined with "Greensleeves" (English, strings), then "Men of Harlech" (Welsh, brass and percussion) combined with "Scotland the Brave" (Scottish, woodwind).
- The finale of the piece, after alluding again to "Early One Morning", ends with a full orchestral version of "Rule Britannia" over which a solo trumpet plays the "Trumpet Voluntary".

== Cancellation ==
On 23 January 2006, the BBC announced that by April 2006 the UK Theme would be scrapped, the station opening instead with a news briefing and extended shipping forecast. Explaining the decision, Radio 4 controller Mark Damazer said: "I know there are some people who will regret the passing of the UK Theme, but I believe the bulk of the audience will be better served by a pacy news briefing, read by one of Radio 4's team of news readers."

The announcement led to mass coverage in the British media and even to comments in its support by then Chancellor of the Exchequer Gordon Brown. On 24 January 2006, several British MPs submitted Early Day Motions about the theme, which led to a question being asked at Prime Minister's Questions, with then Prime Minister Tony Blair referring to the "strong feeling" around the country. Also, BBC Newsnight presenter Jeremy Paxman played the UK Theme to end the programme on a number of occasions and several British orchestras and institutions pledged to play the theme. Meanwhile, another controversy broke out as to whether it was solely Fritz Spiegl who arranged the piece, as the family of Manfred Arlan, the RLPO's principal bassoonist for 35 years claimed it was a joint authorship, citing both names on the score. Spiegl's widow suggested that Arlan was only the copyist, whereas Arlan's family suggested his contribution was more extensive. As both composers are deceased, the true authorship remains unclear, although the published orchestral edition names both men.

On 31 March 2006 the BBC issued a press release confirming that the new Radio 4 schedule would begin on Monday 24 April, meaning that the UK Theme was played for the last time on Sunday 23 April. In it the Controller of Radio 4, Mark Damazer, said: "I'm sorry that part of the audience is upset by the removal of the UK Theme. They may like to know that we will be offering the UK Theme as a stream on the Radio 4 website, where it will be available from Friday 21 April." The following day, the Daily Telegraph carried a short piece saying that the campaign to save the theme had "failed."

On 1 April 2006, the Today programme transmitted a piece claiming that the "UK Theme" would be replaced by a new "EU theme". This was later confirmed as an April Fool joke.

The BBC released no official figure for the number of complaints it has received on the matter of dropping the UK Theme. An article in The Guardian put it at "more than 6,000". The Save The Radio 4 Theme website gathered over 18,000 signatures on an online petition.

On 21 April 2006, the UK Theme was published on the Radio 4 website.

== The single ==
Single cover

On Friday, 17 February 2006, the piece was re-recorded by the Royal Ballet Sinfonia under the direction of Gavin Sutherland and was released as a single on Monday, 27 March, also featuring Ronald Binge's Sailing By, the BBC Radio 4 late night Shipping Forecast theme. The original manuscript was restored by the notable light music composer Ernest Tomlinson after it was discovered in the loft of Ingrid Spiegl's house. The executive producers of the single were Mike Flowers, who had previously had an unexpected hit with his arrangement of Oasis's "Wonderwall", and Liverpool-based conference organiser Simon Roxborough.

During the first week of its release, it charted at number 15 in the Woolworths Singles Chart. On Sunday, 2 April 2006, the single entered the Tesco Singles Chart at number 8 and the UK Singles Chart at number 29. The top-ten placement at Tesco resulted in the single featuring prominently in the store's display areas, while its entry into the UK Singles Chart led to an on-air explanation of the campaign by the presenters of the Radio 1 Chart Show. By the second week of its release, it had dropped to 39th in the UK Singles Chart. In its third week, it fell to number 75.

The same team behind the single were also planning a full-length album of pieces selected from the British light music tradition. The album, provisionally titled "Early One Morning: British Light Music and Broadcasting Classics", was expected to include Country Gardens and Lillibullero (the BBC World Service theme), as well as the re-recorded UK Theme and Sailing By. This appears not to have come to fruition. However, the theme is available in another recording, lasting 5min 29secs, on Naxos Records' British Light Miniatures - Vintage TV and Radio Classics performed by the Royal Philharmonic Orchestra, conducted by Paul Murphy.

== See also ==
- Fantasia on British Sea Songs

== Sources ==
- Hendy, David (2008). Life on Air: A History of Radio Four. Oxford University Press. ISBN 978-0199550241.
- Elmes, Simon; Anthony, Nigel (2007). And Now on Radio 4. Random House. ASIN B000X1MX9C.
