= An Affair to Remember (Our Love Affair) =

Single by Vic Damone
- B-side: "In the Eyes of the World"
- Released: June 3, 1957
- Recorded: 1957
- Studio: Columbia 30th Street Studio, New York City
- Genre: Jazz
- Length: 2:44
- Label: Columbia
- Composer: Harry Warren
- Lyricists: Leo McCarey and Harold Adamson
- Producer: Percy Faith

Vic Damone singles chronology
"Do I Love You (Because You're Beautiful)" (1957)	"An Affair to Remember" (1957)	"Good Nite" (1957)

"An Affair to Remember (Our Love Affair)" is a 1957 romantic song which was composed by Harry Warren for the 1957 film An Affair to Remember. Lyrics were by Leo McCarey and Harold Adamson. The song is sung by Vic Damone during the film's opening credits and then sung later by Deborah Kerr's character, Terry McKay, a nightclub singer-turned-music teacher. Kerr's singing was dubbed by Marni Nixon, who also dubbed for Kerr in the film The King and I.

"An Affair to Remember" was nominated for the Academy Award for Best Original Song in 1957 but lost out to "All the Way".

The song has since become a jazz standard.

== Other recordings ==
- Dinah Washington - included in the album Dinah Discovered (1967).
- Jane Morgan - for her album Fascination (1957).
- Johnny Mathis - included in his album Love Is Everything (1965)
- Julie London - for her album Our Fair Lady (1965)
- Mantovani - on the album Gems Forever (1958)
- Nat King Cole (1957) - recorded for Capitol Records, August 8, 1957.
