= Sailing By =

1963 composition used before the BBC Radio 4 Shipping Forecast

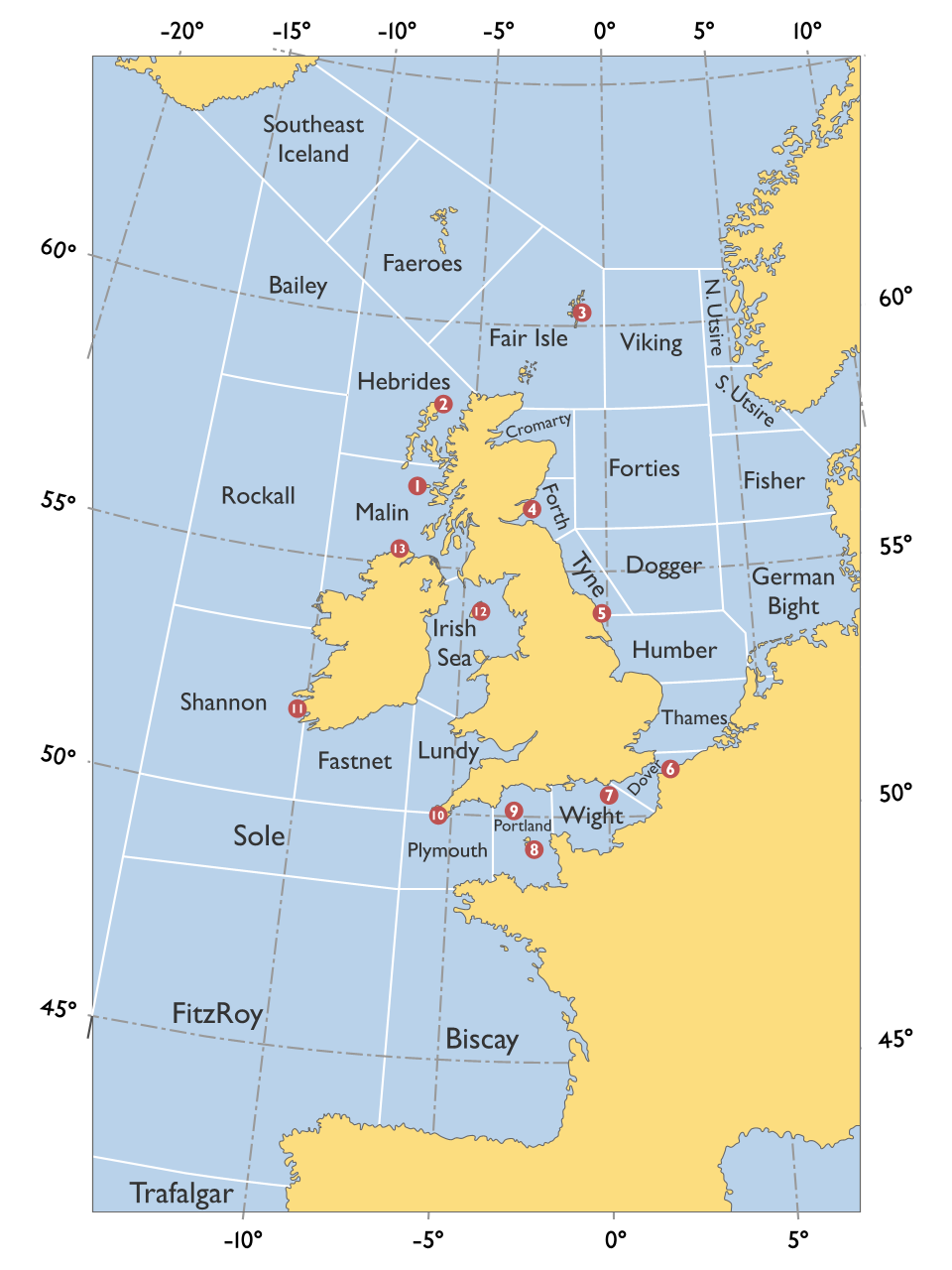
UK Shipping map

"Sailing By" is a short piece of light music composed by Ronald Binge in 1963, which is used before the late Shipping Forecast on BBC Radio 4. A slow waltz, the piece uses a repetitive ABCAB structure and a distinctive rising and falling woodwind arpeggio.

== Context and usage ==
"Sailing By" is played every night on BBC Radio 4 at around 00:45hrs before the late Shipping Forecast. Its tune is repetitive, assisting in its role of serving as a signal for sailors tuning in to be able to easily identify the radio station. It also functions as a buffer: depending on when the final programme before closedown finishes, "Sailing By" (or part of it) is played as a "filler" as the forecast starts at 00:48hrs precisely.

In the 1990s the tune was also adopted for the weekly maritime programme Seascapes on Ireland's RTÉ Radio 1, ceasing at the end of 2009. It has since been reinstated.

== Popularity ==
Besides its intended function, "Sailing By" is thought of affectionately by many British radio listeners, as it is considered a soothing accompaniment to bedtime. The lead singer of the Britpop band Pulp, Jarvis Cocker, chose "Sailing By" as one of his Desert Island Discs, saying for many years he had used it "as an aid to restful sleep".

A version was released in 1965 by John Scott and his Orchestra on the Parlophone label (R 5333). The BBC issued it as a single in 1973 on its own BBC Records label, played by the John Fox Orchestra.

The piece appeared on a single recorded by the Royal Ballet Sinfonia in a quest to save the "Radio 4 UK Theme". In 1993 there was a similar reaction by BBC listeners when "Sailing By" was temporarily taken off the air on weekday schedules, leading to it being re-instated in 1995.

The recording used by the BBC, performed by the Alan Perry/William Gardner Orchestra, was originally only available as library music, but has since 1997 been available commercially as track eleven on the second disc of the EMI CD set titled The Great British Experience (EMI Classics CDGB50). It is also available as track eight on the CD Elizabethan Serenade: The Best of British Light Music, produced by Naxos and performed by the Slovak Radio Symphony Orchestra. The unexplained crediting of the BBC recording to the "Perry Gardner Orchestra", suggesting the existence of a conductor or arranger by that name, is apt to be confusing; indeed, "Alan Perry" and "William Gardner" are pseudonyms for composers Ernest Tomlinson and Peter Hope. The BBC broadcast the original stereo version for a few weeks in the late 1980s, but soon reverted to a mono version.

On New Year's Day 2025 the tune was the subject of an episode in the BBC Radio 4 series Soul Music, including recollection from Binge's son Chris.

== See also ==
- Radio 4 UK Theme
