= Seascapes =

Irish radio programme

Seascapes is a weekly 30-minute Irish radio programme covering maritime matters broadcast on RTÉ Radio 1 on Fridays at 22:30 and formerly presented by the award-winning presenter Tom MacSweeney. The programme deals with all subjects of maritime interest, from leisure to commercial shipping, as well as fishing and the environment, and is known for encouraging listeners' involvement.

Seascapes, which has been running since the 1990s, is one of the most popular night-time programmes on RTÉ Radio 1. It commenced in 1989 as a 15-minute filler on maritime matters by Tom MacSweeney, who had been RTÉ's Southern Correspondent based in Cork for many years and became the station's first Marine Correspondent. The programme was later extended to a 30-minute slot.

Seascapes is made up of various segments put together by producer Marcus Connaughton in the Cork studio. These include reports from the RNLI lifeboat service, a correspondent from Ireland's offshore islands, official maritime notices, the inland waterways and a nostalgic look back at marine events from times past.

The 1,000th edition of Seascapes was broadcast in mid-December 2008 and featured two recorded programmes from the RNLI's new Irish Headquarters in Swords, County Dublin.

Both MacSweeney and the Seascapes theme tune "Sailing By" by Ronald Binge were replaced at the end of 2009. No explanation was given as to why "Sailing By" was replaced. It has since been reinstated.

Tom MacSweeney now hosts This Island Nation which is broadcast fortnightly on independent stations.
