= Comedy Playhouse (series 3) =

The third series of Comedy Playhouse, the long-running BBC series, aired from 28 September 1963 to 31 January 1964.

== Background ==
The third series, which was in black-and-white, consisted of seventeen episodes, each of which had a different cast and storyline. Two of the episodes made it to its own series, The Walrus and the Carpenter, and The Bed which became Meet the Wife.

== Episodes ==
Title	Airdate	Duration	Overview	IMDb link
On The Knocker	28 September 1963	30 mins		
Underworld nights	5 October 1963	30 mins		
Fools Rush In	12 October 1963	30 mins		
Shamrot	19 October 1963	30 mins		
The Bachelor Girls	26 October 1963	30 mins		
The Plan	2 November 1963	30 mins		
A Picture of Innocence	9 November 1963	30 mins		
Nicked at the Bottle	16 November 1963	30 mins		
The Chars	23 November 1963	30 mins		
Comrades in Arms	30 November 1963	30 mins		
The Walrus and the Carpenter	14 December 1963	30 mins		
The Bed	28 December 1963	30 mins	Starring Thora Hird and Freddie Frinton. Following this pilot, a series was commissioned under the name Meet the Wife, which ran for 5 series.	
The Mate Market	3 January 1964	30 mins		
The Hen House	10 January 1964	30 mins		
The Siege of Sydney's Street	17 January 1964	30 mins		
The Mascot	24 January 1964	30 mins		
Good Luck Sir, You've Got a Lucky Face	31 January 1964	30 mins		
