= Lauri Wylie =

British actor and screenwriter (1880–1951)

Lauri Wylie (25 May 1880 – 28 June 1951), originally Maurice Laurence Samuelson Metzenberg, was a British actor and author. He is primarily remembered as the author of the play "Dinner for One", the 1963 screen adaptation of which went on to become the most frequently repeated television programme ever, according to the Guinness Book of Records, due in large part to its place as a New Year's viewing tradition in Germany and other places.

== Early life ==
Born in Southport, Lancashire, Wylie was the son of Henschel and Bertha Samuelson, tobacconists originally from Prussia. By 1891, his mother was widowed and was carrying on the business.

He began life as Morris Laurence Samuelson, recorded as Maurice Laurence Samuelson Metzenberg. Wylie's older brother, Julian Wylie (or Samuelson), was a well-known producer in London, and Lauri Wylie's agent for plays produced as early as 1915. Lauri Wylie is also the brother of early film pioneer G.B. Samuelson and uncle of former British Film Commissioner Sydney Samuelson.

== Career ==
Lauri Wylie began his career in the late 1890s in London as an actor, receiving frequent writeups in the entertainment press of the day. His first work as a playwright was in 1911 with "Early Morning Reflections", which earned him a copyright infringement lawsuit for having plagiarised a similar play, "The Broken Mirror".

He has authored / co-authored several revues and operettas (including Four, Five, Six at the Duke of York's Theatre in London, a parody of Gilbert and Sullivan entitled A "G&S" Cocktail (1925, pub. 1936), and Princess Charming (1930), which was made into a film in 1934 and released under the name Alexandra in the United States in 1935. With his younger brother, G.B. Samuelson, he co-wrote The Game of Life (1922), at the time the longest British feature film ever produced. His other films include A Warm Corner (1930) and Never Trouble Trouble (1931).

His one major success, "Dinner for One", was presented on stage at the Prince of Wales Theatre, London, from 5 to 31 March 1934 as part of a revue written by Wylie called "En Ville Ce Soir". The Stage magazine for 8 March 1934, in its review of “En Ville Ce Soir," said: "A ‘Dinner for One’ sketch is a very laughable burlesque of hackneyed sentimentality by Dorothy Vernon and Mr. Newell [they were the actors]." The basic premise originated in a 1928 routine credited to American actor Red Skelton (though Skelton's intoxicating drug was originally tobacco before a sponsor forced him to change it to alcohol in 1941); as neither Wylie nor Skelton were yet internationally famous at the time of the compositions, neither likely knew of the other's work. Dinner for One was again presented at the Duke of York's Theatre in 1948, and was later presented on Broadway in 1953 in the revue Almanac by John Murray Anderson. Wylie, however, never profited from the script rights which were – allegedly – sold to English comedian Freddie Frinton (who played the role of James the butler in the 1963 television adaptation and had performed the sketch numerous times on stage) after Wylie died.

== Death and legacy ==
Wylie died at age 70 in 1951 in poverty in a camper which served as his home.

Wylie's short play Dinner for One has had a significant cultural impact in Germany. Having been a part of German culture for 50 years, it has spawned thousands of parodies. One such parody, involving German Chancellor Angela Merkel and then-President of France Nicolas Sarkozy, may have led to Mrs. Merkel's widely publicised reference to Dinner for One in her 2012 New Year's address.

== Selected filmography ==
- The Game of Life (1922)
- Never Trouble Trouble (1931)
- Princess Charming (1934)
