= An Affair to Remember =

1957 film by Leo McCarey

- Directed by: Leo McCarey
- Screenplay by: Delmer Daves; Donald Ogden Stewart; Leo McCarey
- Story by: Leo McCarey; Mildred Cram
- Produced by: Leo McCarey; Jerry Wald
- Starring: Cary Grant; Deborah Kerr; Richard Denning
- Cinematography: Milton Krasner
- Edited by: James B. Clark
- Music by: Hugo Friedhofer
- Color process: DeLuxe Color
- Production company: Jerry Wald Productions
- Distributed by: 20th Century Fox
- Release date: July 19, 1957
- Running time: 115 minutes
- Country: United States
- Language: English
- Budget: $2.1 million
- Box office: $3.85 million (U.S./Canada rentals)

An Affair to Remember is a 1957 American romance film directed by Leo McCarey and starring Cary Grant and Deborah Kerr. Filmed in CinemaScope, it was distributed by 20th Century Fox. It is considered among the most romantic films ever according to the American Film Institute. The film was a remake of McCarey's 1939 film Love Affair, starring Irene Dunne and Charles Boyer.

== Plot ==
Nickie Ferrante, a well-known playboy, meets Terry McKay aboard the transatlantic ocean liner SS Constitution en route from Europe to New York. Each is romantically involved with someone else. After a series of meetings aboard the ship, they establish a friendship.

When Terry joins Nickie on a brief visit to his grandmother Janou while the ship is anchored near her home at Villefranche-sur-Mer on the Mediterranean coast, she sees Nickie with new eyes and their feelings become deeper. During their visit, Janou tells Terry that Nickie is a talented painter but destroys most of his paintings because they do not meet his standards. As the ship returns to New York City, they agree to reunite at the top of the Empire State Building in six months' time if they have succeeded in ending their relationships and starting new careers.

On the day of their rendezvous, Terry, hurrying to reach the Empire State Building, is struck down by a car while crossing the street. Gravely injured, she is rushed to the hospital. Meanwhile, Nickie, waiting for her at the observation deck at the top of the building, is unaware of the accident and, after many hours, leaves at midnight, believing that she has rejected him.

After the accident, Terry, now unable to walk, refuses to contact Nickie because of her disability. Instead, she finds work as a music teacher. Nickie has pursued his painting and has his work displayed by Courbet, an art gallery owner. Six months after the accident, Terry sees Nickie with his former fiancée at the ballet. Nickie does not notice her condition because she is seated, and they both say hello.

Nickie learns Terry's address and on Christmas Eve pays her a surprise visit. Although he tries to coax her to explain her actions, Terry dodges the subject, never leaving the couch on which she lies. He gives her the shawl that Janou, who has died, left for her.

As he is leaving, Nickie mentions a painting on which he had been working when they first met, and that it was just given away to a woman who liked it but had no money. He is about to say that the woman was in a wheelchair when he pauses, suddenly suspecting why Terry has been lying still on the couch. He walks into her bedroom and sees the painting hanging on the wall, realizing that she was the woman in the wheelchair. The film ends with the two in a tight embrace as Terry says, "If you can paint, I can walk. Anything can happen, don't you think?"

== Cast ==
- Cary Grant as Nickie Ferrante
- Deborah Kerr as Terry McKay
- Richard Denning as Kenneth Bradley
- Neva Patterson as Lois Clark
- Cathleen Nesbitt as Janou (Nickie's grandmother)
- Robert Q. Lewis as himself (announcer)
- Charles Watts as Ned Hathaway
- Fortunio Bonanova as Courbet
- Marni Nixon as Terry McKay's singing voice

== Production ==
The film was a remake of McCarey's 1939 film Love Affair, starring Irene Dunne as Terry and Charles Boyer as the Gallic playboy Michel Marnet. Plans for a Love Affair remake were first reported in 1952, which had Fernando Lamas and Arlene Dahl attached to the project.

Cary Grant first worked with McCarey on The Awful Truth and did not like McCarey's improvisational strategy, but after eventually warming to it, he wished that he had starred in Love Affair, and he often visited the set during production. He enjoyed the film when it was released and convinced McCarey years later to remake it starring Grant in Boyer's role. McCarey later commented: "Hollywood films all seem to be trying to find a trick way of saying 'I love you.' What are they trying to prove? Love is the oldest and noblest emotion." An Affair to Remember was almost identical to the original on a scene-to-scene basis. McCarey used the same screenplay as was employed for the original film, written by Delmer Daves and Donald Ogden Stewart, but Stewart was not included in the credits because he had been blacklisted. Filming took place between February and April 1957.

Grant was reportedly grumpy during filming because his hypnotherapy with his wife caused him to dislike smoking. He also underwent an operation during production to treat a lump on his forehead that resulted from a childhood injury.

The theme song "An Affair to Remember (Our Love Affair)," composed by Harry Warren and with lyrics by Leo McCarey and Harold Adamson, was sung by Vic Damone over the opening credits and by Marni Nixon (who dubbed Kerr) during the film.

== Songs ==
- An Affair to Remember (Our Love Affair) sung by Vic Damone
- "Continué," sung by Marni Nixon (dubbing Kerr)
- "The Tiny Scout (He Knows You Inside Out)" sung by Marni Nixon (dubbing Kerr)
- "Tomorrow Land" sung by Marni Nixon (dubbing Kerr)
- "You Make It Easy to Be True"

All of the above;

- Music by Harry Warren
- Lyrics by Harold Adamson and Leo McCarey

Other, competing commercial recordings of the song appeared at the time of the film's release, including those by Carmen Cavallaro (Decca Records), Pete King (Liberty), Angela Drake and Leroy Holmes (M-G-M), The Leaders (PIV), Luis Arcarez (RCA Victor), Machito (Tico), and Vi Vienne (VIP Records).

== Novelization ==
In anticipation of the film's release, Avon Books published a paperback novelization of the screenplay. The byline Owen Aherne was a pseudonym for American novelist R.V. Cassill.

== Reception ==
=== Box office ===
In October 1958 Variety estimated the film had earned $7 million worldwide.

=== Critical reaction ===
Bosley Crowther of The New York Times found the early part of the film fairly enjoyable, with "plenty of humorous conversation that is handled crisply" by the leads, but concluded that the picture goes wrong after the couple disembarks, writing: "The marriage pact seems ridiculously childish for a couple of adult people to make. The lady's failure to notify her fiancé of her accident seems absurd. The fact that the man does not hear of it in some way is beyond belief. And the slowness with which he grasps the obvious when he calls upon the lady is just too thick." Richard L. Coe of The Washington Post agreed, writing that the film "boasts early amusing reels that ultimately become unbelievably foolish in the quest for audience tears." Variety disagreed, calling the romance "never maudlin" and "wholly believable" in a positive review of what it called "a winning film" with "all the ingredients that should make it an ideal women's picture." Harrison's Reports was also positive, calling it "more enchanting and delightful than the original" and "so powerful in the closing scenes that one is unable to fight back the tears." John McCarten of The New Yorker was dismissive, writing that the actors were "tolerable, but the movie is really awfully maudlin." A generally positive review in The Monthly Film Bulletin called the film "a lush slice of Hollywood romanticism, unashamedly following most of the familiar conventions of glossy magazine fiction. To judge it on a higher level would normally seem unfair if it were not that here the script does succeed in cutting rather deeper. The relationship between Ferrante and Terry McKay is briskly developed, with an attractive, often touching humor." The Philadelphia Inquirer review invoked the 1939 original: "18 years ago we wept and worried over the romantic pangs of Irene Dunne and Charles Boyer in 'Love Affair.' It seems distinctly unimportant now when misunderstandings disrupt the billing and cooing of Deborah Kerr and Cary Grant in 'An Affair to Remember,' Leo McCarey's interminably extended version of 'Love Affair'."

On the review aggregator website Rotten Tomatoes, 65% of 34 critics' reviews are positive, with an average rating of 6.60/10. The website's consensus reads: "There's not too much to it besides Cary Grant and Deborah Kerr, but that's still enough to make this An Affair to Remember." Metacritic, which uses a weighted average, assigned the film a score of 71 out of 100, based on 14 critics, indicating "generally favorable" reviews. In 1998, Jonathan Rosenbaum of the Chicago Reader included the film in his unranked list of the best American films not included on the AFI Top 100. It is one of the BFI's "50 great Christmas films currently streaming".

== Accolades ==
Award	Category	Nominee(s)	Result
Academy Awards	Best Cinematography	Milton Krasner	Nominated
Academy Awards	Best Costume Design	Charles LeMaire	Nominated
Academy Awards	Best Scoring	Hugo Friedhofer	Nominated
Academy Awards	Best Song	"An Affair to Remember"; Music by Harry Warren; Lyrics by Leo McCarey and Harold Adamson	Nominated
Boxoffice Magazine Awards	Best Picture of the Month for the Whole Family (August)	Leo McCarey	Won
Directors Guild of America Awards	Outstanding Directorial Achievement in Motion Pictures	Leo McCarey	Nominated
Laurel Awards	Top Music Composer	Hugo Friedhofer	5th Place
Photoplay Awards	Gold Medal		Won

- AFI's 100 Years...100 Passions – #5

== Legacy ==
- Nora Ephron's 1993 film Sleepless in Seattle, starring Tom Hanks and Meg Ryan, was partly inspired by An Affair to Remember, particularly the ending. References, clips and the theme song from the earlier film are used throughout.
- A 1994 remake, reverting to the original title of Love Affair, starred Warren Beatty (who also wrote and produced) and his wife Annette Bening. The film featured Katharine Hepburn in her last screen appearance, portraying the male protagonist's aunt; this character replaces the grandmother from the original film.
- İlk Aşk, a 1960 Turkish film, was an adaptation of the film.
- Bheegi Raat, a 1965 Bollywood film starring Ashok Kumar and Meena Kumari, was an adaptation of the film.
- Yağmur, a 1971 Turkish film starring Hülya Koçyiğit and Ediz Hun, was an adaptation of the film.
- Mann, a 1999 Bollywood film starring Aamir Khan and Manisha Koirala was almost a scene-by-scene copy of the film.
- The 1999 Indian Telugu-language film Ravoyi Chandamama was an adaptation of the film.
- In 2009, the HBO film Grey Gardens licensed an aerial shot of The Pierre hotel from this film.
- The climax of the 1980 Bollywood film Ek Baar Kaho is inspired by this film's climax.
- A sound clip from the film was used on Basement's 2011 album I Wish I Could Stay Here in the song "Fading."
- In a Season 3 episode of Gossip Girl, characters Chuck and Blair rekindle their love and agree to meet on top of the Empire State Building at 7:01 p.m., as in the film.
- In the TV series 30 Rock, Tracy Jordan claims to have starred in a remake of An Affair to Remember titled A Blaffair to Rememblack.
- In an episode of the TV series Family Guy, there is a cutaway gag of what the film would be like in the age of cell phones. After being struck, Terry tells Nickie that she is paralyzed, and he abruptly ends the call and tosses the phone off the observation deck.
- In the episode "Meanwhile" of the TV series Futurama, after proposing to Leela, Fry invites her to meet him atop the Vampire State Building at 6:30 pm if she agrees to marry him. If she does not arrive, he will infer rejection.
