= The Watermill =

1958 Ronald Binge composition

The Watermill is a piece of music that was published by Ronald Binge in 1958. Elements from it had been used in the score of the British comedy film Our Girl Friday, released in 1953, and it was later used as the theme music for a BBC television adaptation of The Secret Garden.

The Watermill was originally written for the oboe and a string orchestra but may be played on other instruments such as the clarinet. It has placed high in polls of the British public, such as those organised for the programme, Your Hundred Best Tunes.

== In popular culture ==
- Was used as the theme music to the Anglia TV series The Wind In The Willows (1969).
- Is heard as the theme and background music throughout the ABC Radio comedy series Brunswick Heads Revisited by Angela Webber and Adam Bowen (Australian Broadcasting Commission,1982).
