= Meet the Wife (TV series) =

1963 British TV sitcom

- Freddie Frinton & Thora Hird
- Genre: Sitcom
- Created by: Chesney and Wolfe
- Starring: Freddie Frinton; Thora Hird
- Country of origin: United Kingdom
- No. of series: 5
- No. of episodes: 39 (including pilot; 22 missing)

Production
- Running time: 30 minutes

Original release
- Network: BBC1
- Release: 28 December 1963 – 19 December 1966

Meet the Wife is a 1960s BBC sitcom written by Chesney and Wolfe, which featured Freddie Frinton as Freddie Blacklock with Thora Hird as his tyrannical wife Thora. It ran for five series.

The series was based on a 1963 BBC television Comedy Playhouse production, "The Bed". The theme tune was by Russ Conway and incidental music by Norman Percival and later Dennis Wilson. The producers were John Paddy Carstairs and later Robin Nash.

== Outline ==
The series followed the various ups and downs of a middle-aged married couple, Freddie and Thora Blacklock. Of the two, Fred played the "straight man", weary under Thora's nagging. He was a plumber who liked a bit of betting and a drink before coming home. His wife Thora was noted for her incessant talking while giving her husband a hard time. The couple had at least two children, one named Peter who was 23 and married.

Apart from one, the catchphrases of the series belonged to Thora. The first occurred whenever the socially-aspiring Thora introduced her husband, when she would snobbishly pronounce his name "Frayed", remarking that he was "a Master plumber", with the emphasis on the word Master. The other was to throw an irate accusative tantrum at poor, downtrodden Fred, with the words, "Every time [such-and-such happens], you always go berserk" The word berserk was given great emphasis, as "Ber-Serk", and always had a successful comedic effect as Fred would wilt under the onslaught. She would also answer the phone with an affected "Hellewe", generally half way through an angry rant at Fred.

Fred also had a catchphrase; always uttering an affected, over-the-top, supposed-upper class "Yai-sss", accompanied by tilted head, sycophantic smile and rapid eye-blinking, in response to Thora's request for confirmation (e.g. "Isn't that right, Fred?") on some point she was making to any member of the group she was aspiring to equal socially.

The series has much in common with the later BBC sitcom Keeping Up Appearances, except that the central couple were unmistakably working class while in Appearances social climbing was a central element of the programme.

== Episodes ==
=== Pilot ===
The pilot episode, titled "The Bed", was first broadcast in series three of Comedy Playhouse on 28 December 1963.

Fred and Thora have been using the same bed for 25 years and it is lumpy and past its best. Thora decides that it's time to get not just a new bed but two separate beds, because Fred keeps taking the bedclothes, etc. However two beds cost much more than one so she settles on a nice bed, but the first night is a nightmare for Fred as Thora tries to get settled, so he goes to the spare room to sleep on the old bed. While still nagging him though he's now in another room, Thora finds his gift and card for their Silver Anniversary the next day, costing the £15 she thought he'd wasted. She grabs the bedclothes, goes to the other room, and gets into bed with Fred. Brian Oulton was the bed salesman.

=== Series 1 ===
No.	Title	Original release date
1	"Getting Away"	21 April 1964
Thora's dream of a foreign holiday seems impossible because of lack of funds until Fred gets a rare win on the dogs. They go into meticulous detail with their packing while Fred tries to hide the fact that he has actually paid for the holiday on Hire purchase.
2	"Coming Home"	28 April 1964
The couple return from Majorca but Fred has spent the whole flight drinking with a holiday friend and causes havoc going through customs. Once back home, they discover they have no food or money, and Fred's big job has been cancelled.
3	"The Back"	5 May 1964
Fred wants a quiet lie-in on a Sunday morning but his wife keeps him nearly as busy as her nagging tongue. He's finally had enough and goes to the pub. She is worried because he is late coming back but he has been to the other side of town to get the pills for her bad back, which she has been moaning about all morning. Harold Goodwin was the milkman.
4	"Night Out"	12 May 1964
5	"Little Andrew"	19 May 1964
Fred and Thora are looking after their baby grandson and Thora is being somewhat officious to little Andrew's needs, much to Fred's discomfort.
6	"The Business Dinner"	26 May 1964
A couple they knew from years back are coming to dinner and Thora wants to make a good impression on them as he builds houses and could put some plumbing work Fred's way. Her patience is sorely tried as the woman goes on about how well off they are until one of Fred's mates drops by and tells her that the man's house business is near bankruptcy because his wife spends so much.
7	"The Strain"	2 June 1964
Plumber's helper Sid (Brian Rawlinson) has taken the day off to get himself a new bike. Fred hurts his arm and head getting a bath upstairs on his own and comes home early. Thora takes his temperature, which is 103.F (she forgot to shake the thermometer so the temperature is of the boy next door who used it last) and the doctor is called. She panics to get everything tidy before he arrives, which leads to a number of disasters.

=== Series 2 ===
No.	Title	Original release date
1	"Shopping"	12 November 1964
2	"The Teenage Niece"	19 November 1964
Fred's 17-year-old niece is staying over and going out with a young man in town. Cue Thora's consternation as she brings the man back to the house.
3	"The Shelf"	26 November 1964
4	"The Invitation"	3 December 1964
5	"The Lesson"	10 December 1964
6	"The Wallpaper"	17 December 1964

=== Series 3 ===
No.	Title	Original release date
1	"The Ring"	18 April 1965
2	"The Bathroom"	25 April 1965
3	"Cousin Olive"	2 May 1965
4	"The Loft"	9 May 1965
5	"Doctor's Orders"	16 May 1965
6	"The Picnic"	23 May 1965

=== Series 4 ===
No.	Title	Original release date
1	"The Pain"	22 November 1965
Fred has a recurring abdominal pain, which is enough to trigger Thora's paranoia as she leafs through her medical dictionary.
2	"Her Birthday"	29 November 1965
Having once again forgotten Thora's birthday, Fred is forced to make last minute arrangements that inevitably blow up in his face, causing much embarrassment for Thora.
3	"Brother Tom"	6 December 1965
Fred's brother Tom (Stanley Meadows) has been in town on business and now there is a heavy fog so rather than drive the 50 miles home, Fred says it is OK for him to stay with them. However Tom brings a lady friend, Josie (Ann Kennedy) with him and Thora is determined that there should be no hanky-panky between the two, even if she and Fred have to stay up all night to keep an eye on them, and her lecherous husband who has taken a fancy to Josie.
4	"The Hotel"	13 December 1965
Fred and Thora travel to Paddington for a builder's conference but the car breaks down on the way (due to Fred's refusing to fix the radiator). Having missed their booking at a boarding house, they are forced to stay at an expensive hotel, and are determined to get their money's worth.
5	"The Merry Widow"	20 December 1965
Fred is too friendly with Mrs Jackson aka "Blossom" (Avis Bunnage) who moved in across the road last month and because of circumstances Thora thinks there is something going on between them. Arthur Howard as The Vicar.
6	"Journey Home"	27 December 1965
Fred and Thora have spent christmas with their son (not seen), his wife Peggy (Jean Marlow) and two children. They go home on Boxing Day but get in the wrong part of the train which means they travel 30 miles in the wrong direction and have to spend seven hours in a freezing cold waiting room.

=== Series 5 ===
No.	Title	Original release date
1	"The Holiday"	26 September 1966
2	"Continental Tour"	3 October 1966
3	"The Return"	10 October 1966
4	"The Diet"	17 October 1966
5	"My Husband's Brother"	24 October 1966
6	"Tilly-Ann"	31 October 1966
7	"Old Time Dancing"	7 November 1966
Thora enrolls them both into a dancing contest then bullies Fred into joining her. There is a big fuss over them getting dressed on the night then Fred loses a shirt sleeve while dancing so it's all his fault they won't be there next week and on TV. Peter West appears as himself, as the compere.
8	"The Schoolboy"	14 November 1966
9	"The Homework"	21 November 1966
10	"The Nasty Sleeper"	28 November 1966
11	"Bless 'Em All"	5 December 1966
12	"This Christmas, Shop Early!"	12 December 1966
13	"Christmas Travel"	19 December 1966

- There was also a "Meet the Wife" sketch on BBC's Christmas Night with the Stars for 1964.

== Surviving episodes ==
In common with many other British television series of this era, not all episodes have survived. Only 17 episodes exist in the BBC archives as of June 2020. The following are currently thought to exist:

- Pilot
- Series 1: 1-7
- Series 2: 1-2
- Series 4: 1-6
- Series 5: 7

The first and the fourth series both exist in their entirety (as does the original pilot episode) but Series 2 (of which only the first two episodes remain) and Series 5 (of which only one episode exists) remain incomplete with the entire third series still missing from the TV archives as of 2020.

== DVD release ==
A DVD, (consisting of the remaining episodes of the series) was released on 24 October 2016. Early editions of the set had a mastering fault whereby the episode "Brother Tom" was accidentally excluded.

== Dutch adaptation ==
A Dutch television series Kent u mijn vrouw (do you know my wife) aired on october 22nd, 1967, starring Nell Koppen and Wim van der Brink. This NCRV-production used the original british script, translated by Jaap van der Merwe. The 10 episodes received mixed reactions and the series was cancelled in May 1968.

== In popular culture ==
The series' title is mentioned in The Beatles' 1967 song "Good Morning Good Morning".
