= 10th Directors Guild of America Awards =

- Date: 1958
- Country: United States
- Presented by: Directors Guild of America

Highlights
- Best Director Feature Film: The Bridge on the River Kwai – David Lean
- Best Director Television: Schlitz Playhouse of Stars for "The Lonely Wizard" – Don Weis
- Website: https://www.dga.org/Awards/History/1950s/1957.aspx?value=1957

The 10th Directors Guild of America Awards, honoring the outstanding directorial achievements in film and television in 1957, were presented in 1958.

== Winners and nominees ==
=== Film ===
Feature Film

David Lean – The Bridge on the River Kwai

- George Cukor – Les Girls
- Stanley Donen – Funny Face
- José Ferrer – The Great Man
- John Huston – Heaven Knows, Mr. Allison
- Elia Kazan – A Face in the Crowd
- Stanley Kramer – The Pride and the Passion
- Joshua Logan – Sayonara
- Sidney Lumet – 12 Angry Men
- Anthony Mann – Men in War
- Leo McCarey – An Affair to Remember
- Robert Mulligan – Fear Strikes Out
- Mark Robson – Peyton Place
- John Sturges – Gunfight at the O.K. Corral
- Billy Wilder – Witness for the Prosecution
- Fred Zinnemann – A Hatful of Rain

=== Television ===
Television

Don Weis – Schlitz Playhouse of Stars for "The Lonely Wizard"

- Earl Bellamy – Wagon Train for "The Clara Beauchamp Story"
- Robert Florey – Wagon Train for "The Ruth Owens Story"
- Bernard Girard – Playhouse 90 for "Four Women in Black"
- Philip Rogers – The Salem Witch Trials
