= Mantovani Stereo Showcase =

Studio album by Mantovani and His Orchestra
- Released: 1959
- Genre: Easy listening
- Label: London

Mantovani and His Orchestra chronology
Continental Encores (1959)	Mantovani Stereo Showcase (1959)	Film Encores Vol. 2 (1959)

Mantovani Stereo Showcase is an album by Mantovani and His Orchestra. It was released in 1959 by London (catalog no. SS 1). It debuted on Billboard magazine's pop album chart on June 1, 1959, peaked at the No. 6 spot, and remained on the chart for 11 weeks. AllMusic later gave the album a rating of three stars.

== Track listing ==
Side 1

1. "Theme From Limelight" (Chaplin) [2:55]
2. "Village Swallows" (Strauss, arranged by Mantovani) [3:15]
3. "Tammy" (Evans, Skinner, Livingston) [3:35]
4. "Come Prima (For the First Time)" (Di Paoia, Taccani, Ram) [2:40]

Side 2

1. "Greensleeves" (traditional, arranged by Binge) [3:15]
2. "Schön Rosmarin" (Kreisler, arranged by Mantovani) [2:15]
3. "I Could Have Danced All Night" (Loewe, Lerner) [3:00]
4. "Some Enchanted Evening" (Rodgers, Hammerstein) [3:30]
