= Trouble in the Air =

1948 British film by Charles Saunders

- Opening titles
- Directed by: Charles Saunders
- Written by: George Black Jr.; Alfred Black; Jack Davies; Martin Lane; Michael Pertwee
- Produced by: George Black Jr.; Alfred Black
- Starring: Freddie Frinton; Jimmy Edwards; Bill Owen
- Cinematography: Roy Fogwell
- Edited by: Graeme Hamilton
- Music by: Arthur Wilkinson
- Production company: Highbury Productions
- Distributed by: General Film Distributors
- Release date: 1 November 1948
- Running time: 55 minutes
- Country: United Kingdom
- Language: English

Trouble in the Air is a 1948 British comedy film directed by Charles Saunders and starring Freddie Frinton, Jimmy Edwards, and Bill Owen. It was made at Highbury Studios as a second feature. The film's sets were designed by the art director Don Russell.

== Synopsis ==
A BBC broadcaster travels to a small village for a feature on a bell-ringing team but becomes entangled in an attempt by a spiv to cheat an impoverished local landowner. Assisted by the loyal butler the landowner is eventually saved by a football pools win, even if the broadcast turns out to be a disaster.

== Cast ==
- Freddie Frinton as Fred Somers
- Jimmy Edwards as B. Barrington Crockett
- Joyce Golding as Miss Polly Clinch
- Bill Owen as 1st spiv
- Malcolm Russell as Sir Charles Newdigate
- Laurence Naismith as Tom Hunt
- Jon Pertwee as Truelove
- Sam Costa as 2nd spiv
- Lisa Lee as Mrs. Hunt
- Dennis Vance as Larry Somers
- Stella Hamilton as April Newdigate
- Lionel Murton as 1st boy
- David Liney as 2nd boy
- Gerald Kent as Mr. Barnes
- Patsy Drake as Cockett's secretary

== Bibliography ==
- Chibnall, Steve & McFarlane, Brian. The British 'B' Film. Palgrave MacMillan, 2009.
