= Dinner for One =

1963 TV comedy sketch

- Written by: Lauri Wylie
- Directed by: Heinz Dunkhase
- Presented by: Heinz Piper
- Starring: Freddie Frinton; May Warden
- Music by: Lew Pollack
- Country of origin: West Germany
- Original language: English (with German introduction)

Production
- Running time: 18 minutes

Original release
- Network: NDR
- Release: 8 July 1963

Dinner for One, also known as The 90th Birthday (German: Der 90. Geburtstag), is a television comedy sketch that is repeated every New Year's Eve in several European countries. The two-hander sketch was originally written by British author Lauri Wylie for the theatre. After featuring on the stage, the German TV broadcaster, Norddeutscher Rundfunk (NDR), recorded the sketch in 1963 as an 18-minute black-and-white videotape recording, performed in English by British comedians Freddie Frinton and May Warden. The sketch begins with an introduction in German, followed by the main act in English, and is available online.

It has become traditional viewing on New Year's Eve in countries such as Germany, Switzerland, Luxembourg, Denmark, Sweden, Finland and Estonia. In Norway it is broadcast on 23 December. As of 1995 it was the most frequently repeated television programme in Germany. Despite originating as a British stage sketch, the TV version gained only limited recognition in the UK over 50 years after its recording. It was broadcast on New Year's Eve in Britain on Sky Arts from 2018 to 2020.

In other parts of the world, the sketch is broadcast in Australia and South Africa. Apart from a few satires, Dinner for One is not known in the United States, where the comic premise had already been made famous by Red Skelton and Lucille Ball.

In 2003, Danish TV producer Paul Anthony Sørensen directed and produced a documentary about the sketch that includes interviews with relatives of Freddie Frinton and May Warden. It was nominated for the Rose d'Or 2004.

== Plot ==
In German-speaking countries, the broadcast features an introduction by Heinz Piper as the conferencier: Miss Sophie (Warden) is celebrating her 90th birthday. As every year, she has invited her four closest friends to a birthday dinner: Sir Toby, Admiral von Schneider, Mr Pomeroy, and Mr Winterbottom. However, she has outlived all of them, requiring her butler James (Frinton) to impersonate the guests. In some non-German-speaking countries the introduction is omitted.

James must not only serve Miss Sophie the four courses à la russe – mulligatawny soup, North Sea haddock, chicken and fruit – but also serve the four imaginary guests the drinks chosen by Miss Sophie (sherry, white wine, champagne and port wine for the respective courses), slip into the role of each guest and drink a toast to Miss Sophie four times for each course. As a result, James becomes increasingly intoxicated and loses his dignified demeanour: he pours the drinks with reckless abandon, breaks into "Sugartime" by the McGuire Sisters for a brief moment, and at one point accidentally drinks from a flower vase, which he acknowledges with a grimace, exclaiming, "Oooh! I'll kill that cat!"

There are several running gags in the piece:

- James frequently trips over the head of a tigerskin rug; as an additional embellishment, he walks past it in one instance to his own astonishment, but then stumbles over it on the way back. In another instance, he gracefully steps over it, and in the final instance, the tipsy James leaps over the head.
- Sir Toby would like to have poured a small extra amount of each drink, and James complies with the request with initial politeness and then increasing sarcasm.
- Miss Sophie expects James, as Admiral von Schneider, to knock his heels together with the exclamation "Skål!" (Scandinavian for "Cheers!"). Because this action proves painful, he asks each time whether he really has to, but obliges upon Miss Sophie's insistence. On one occasion James's feet miss each other, causing him to stumble.
- Before each course, James asks (this gradually becomes a babble): "The same procedure as last year, Miss Sophie?"; Miss Sophie replies "The same procedure as every year, James."

Miss Sophie concludes the evening with an inviting "I think I'll retire", to which James and Sophie repeat their exchange concerning the "same procedure". James takes a deep breath, turns to the audience with a sly grin and says "Well, I'll do my very best!" before the pair retreat to the upper rooms.

== Origin of the sketch ==
Lauri Wylie debuted Dinner for One as a sketch in his London stage revue En Ville Ce Soir in 1934.

Frinton and Warden performed Dinner for One on stage on Britain's seaside piers as early as 1945; Frinton inherited the rights to the sketch in 1951 after Wylie's death. The sketch was also staged elsewhere, for example in 1953 in John Murray Anderson's Almanac at the Imperial Theatre with Hermione Gingold playing Miss Sophie, and Billy DeWolfe as the butler and four dead friends.

In 1962, German entertainer Peter Frankenfeld and director Heinz Dunkhase discovered Dinner for One in Blackpool. The sketch was staged in Frankenfeld's live show on 8 March 1963 at the Theater am Besenbinderhof, Hamburg. Since no recordings of live TV shows could be made with the technology of the time, a recorded version was commissioned, which was staged at NDR's Studio B in the Lokstedt quarter of Hamburg, in front of a live audience, between 30 April and 4 May 1963. This version was first broadcast on 8 July 1963. The sketch was recorded in English with a short introduction in German. The introductory theme, Charmaine, was composed by Lew Pollack and recorded by the Victor Silvester orchestra. According to the NDR, Frinton and Warden were each paid DM 4,150. The recorded show was re-run occasionally until it gained its fixed spot on New Year's Eve in 1972.

The comic premise of the skit—a man consuming multiple rounds of alcohol and becoming comically drunk—is generally credited to American actor Red Skelton, who included a similar sketch as part of his vaudeville routines beginning in 1928 (and allowed the premise to be used by Lucille Ball in the famed I Love Lucy episode "Lucy Does a TV Commercial"). There is no definitive evidence of when Wylie wrote the sketch; the first evidence there is of the Dinner for One sketch being performed is from 1934, and as neither Skelton nor Wylie were internationally famous at the time, neither one likely knew of the other's work.

== Broadcasting countries ==
The sketch has become a viewing tradition on New Year's Eve in German-speaking countries, where up to half the population may watch it every year on New Year's Eve. Some die-hard fans even copy the meal served in the sketch. The full 18-minute version is typically aired in Germany on Das Erste in the afternoon, and the regional third channels several times throughout the afternoon and evening. In Austria, ORF 1 airs the full sketch around 11:30 pm. Swiss public broadcaster SRF shows its own 11-minute version around 7:00 pm on SRF 1 and at 11:50 pm on SRF zwei.

In Finland, the show is viewed by 400,000 viewers each New Year's Eve. It is also a New Year tradition in Scandinavian countries.

In Sweden, the show was suspended for six years after its first screening, deemed unsuitable because of James's heavy drinking. However, the TV network finally capitulated to popular demand and brought it back. It has been broadcast every year since 1976 in Sweden, with the exception of 2004 in the wake of the 2004 Indian Ocean earthquake and tsunami.

In 1985, the Danish television network, DR, decided not to broadcast the sketch, but received so many complaints that it returned the following year. With this single exception, Dinner for One has been shown on DR every 31 December since 1980.

It is also broadcast annually on New Year's Eve in the Faroe Islands.

In Norway, the show is broadcast on 23 December, also since 1980. In 1992, it was aired 15 minutes early, and the resulting audience uproar caused it to be re-broadcast later that night.

It is broadcast annually on New Year's Eve in Australia by public broadcaster SBS (since 1989) and South Africa, though it is not as well known as in Europe. It was shown briefly in the US (by HBO) in the 1970s.

The sketch is almost completely unknown in the United Kingdom, and its first national British television airing did not come until Sky Arts broadcast the film on New Year's Eve 2018 (although a year before, the film had been screened on Grimsby local channel Estuary TV). The Sky Arts broadcast included English subtitles for the German-language introduction, the end of which briefly faded out followed by a fade in on Frinton, cutting out the moment when the German announcer introduces James.

In German-speaking countries, the sketch is usually shown in the original English without dubbing or subtitles. It is easy to understand with even a basic knowledge of English due to the physical nature of the comedy. British people are often perplexed by German fans' ability to quote dialogue. After its sensational success on continental Europe Norddeutscher Rundfunk offered the sketch to the BBC. However, the BBC was not interested since the sketch did not meet BBC quality standards.

== Different versions ==
The NDR television channel recorded several other versions in 1963. Danish TV shows a version in which no audience is heard.

A third, 11-minute version was recorded by Schweizer Fernsehen (Swiss Television) with less alcohol drunk.

Both the 18-minute and 11-minute versions have been released on DVD in Germany.

In 1977, the Dutch public broadcasting system created a Dutch language version starring Joop Doderer, but this never achieved the same popularity.

In 1999, the NDR released a colourised version.

In Denmark, a parody of the sketch was filmed, subtitled "The 80th Birthday", in which Miss Sophie's friends are still at the table (though the NDR version mentions that the last of Miss Sophie's friends died 25 years ago). Other versions have been produced in different German dialects, including one in Low German (this version, "Dinner for One Up Platt," is also aired on NDR in rotation annually along with the original), various re-enactments or parodies by different comedians, and a version featuring the German glove puppet character Bernd das Brot ("Bernd the Bread") named "dinner for brot". In 1992 a colour version was filmed in the Frankfurt festival hall with Bodo Maria and Macha Stein. The resulting VHS cassette/DVD was dedicated to the Frankfurt UFA GmbH star Camilla Horn. Camilla Horn had originally been meant to play the role of Miss Sophie. However, she had to withdraw due to illness.

On 24 December 2011, a digitally edited satirical version entitled "The 90th Euro rescue summit, or, Euros for No One", produced by Udo Eling and German state broadcaster ARD, was uploaded to YouTube. It features German Chancellor Angela Merkel as Miss Sophie and French President Nicolas Sarkozy as her servant and has new German (and some French) dialogue about the Eurozone debt crisis.

In 2016, Netflix made a parody in which the guests are replaced with characters from Netflix shows, specifically Saul Goodman from Breaking Bad and Better Call Saul, Frank Underwood from House of Cards, Pablo Escobar from Narcos, and Crazy Eyes from Orange is the New Black.

== Catch phrase: "Same procedure as every year" ==
The line "Same procedure as every year" (in the original English) has become a very popular catchphrase in Germany. The phrase has entered everyday vocabulary, and is used in newspaper headlines and advertisements. This is also the case in Norway, Denmark and Sweden.

== Legacy ==
The sketch resonated strongly with Norwegian, Luxembourgish and German audiences. The sketch is one of the most widely known pieces of English-language media in Europe despite its relatively minimal impact in Britain.

Deutsche Post issued a commemorative stamp for the show on 11 October 2018.

In January 2021, Google added an easter egg to their Knowledge Panel for the film. The panel included a tiger's head, which when clicked showed James running across the screen and tripping over said tiger. It also featured sound clips from the film, chiefly the line "Same procedure as every year, James."

In December 2022, it was announced that German studio UFA would produce a six-part prequel series, set 50 years before the original version. It was published as "Miss Sophie – Same Procedure as Every Year" in 2025 on Prime Video.

In March 2023, King Charles III, delivering a speech at a banquet during his state visit to Germany, raised a laugh by saying, in German, "It is nice of you all, not to have left me alone with a 'Dinner for One'!" In his speech to the German Bundestag, Charles III referred to "Miss Sophie" as an example of cultural exchange between Britain and Germany; although he admitted that Miss Sophie does not "give a very accurate impression of modern Britain".
