= Elizabethan Serenade =

Light music composition by Ronald Binge

External audio
- You may hear Elizabethan Serenade by Ronald Binge, as performed by Annunzio Mantovani and the Mantovani Orchestra in 1971 at archive.org

Elizabethan Serenade is a light music composition by Ronald Binge. When it was first played in a 1951 radio broadcast by the Mantovani orchestra, it was titled "Andante Cantabile", although the original orchestral manuscript parts in Binge's own hand show the title "The Man in the Street" (possibly the title of an early television documentary). The name was altered by the composer to reflect the post-war optimism of a "new Elizabethan Age" that began with the accession of Queen Elizabeth II in February 1952.

The piece won Binge an Ivor Novello Award and also had chart success in Germany (recorded by the Günther Kallmann Choir in 1962) and South Africa. A version with lyrics by poet Christopher Hassall called "Where the Gentle Avon Flows" was released, and the work also had lyrics added in German, Czech, Norwegian, Swedish, Finnish, Dutch, Danish and French. The piece was used as the signature tune to Music in Miniature on the BBC Light Programme.

In 1968, a reggae version titled "Elizabeth Reggay" by Boris Gardiner & the Love People was released. It was re-issued as "Elizabethan Reggae", with a different B-side, in 1969 (initially erroneously credited to the track's producer, Byron Lee and the Dragonaires) and later covered by Bad Manners.

In 1982, Louise Tucker recorded a different vocal version titled "Only For You" on the album Midnight Blue.
