= Waltzing with Mantovani =

Studio album by Mantovani and His Orchestra
- Released: June 1951
- Genre: Easy listening
- Label: London

Waltzing with Mantovani is an album by Mantovani and His Orchestra. It was released in June 1951 by London Recordings (catalog no. LB 381).

A review in The Ottawa Citizen noted: "Mantovani, a violinist, has surrounded himself with a very fine group of instrumentalists and the result is full-toned pleasure. There are no fancy arrangements in Mantovani's work. He turns out waltz tempos that are a pleasure for dancing or just plain listening."

Another review, in The Vancouver Sun, called it a "pleasant item" with "exceptionally fine recording."

The song, "Charmaine", was also released as a single and spent 19 weeks on the singles chart starting in November 1951; it peaked at No. 10.

== Track listing ==
Side A

1. "Wyoming" (Williams)
2. "Under the Roofs of Paris" (Moretti, Siever)
3. "Kisses in the Dark" (Micheli)
4. "For You" (Dubin, Burke)

Side B

1. "Diane" (Rapee, Pollack)
2. "Babette" (Nicholls)
3. "Just for Awhile" (Geiger, Anderson)
4. "Charmaine" (Rapee, Pollack)
