= May Warden =

English actress (1891–1978)

- Born: 9 May 1891; Leeds, West Riding of Yorkshire, England
- Died: 5 October 1978 (aged 87); London, England
- Occupation: Actress
- Known for: Playing the older Sara Kingdom in Doctor Who: The Daleks' Master Plan
- Spouse: Silvester Stuart (m. 1915; died 1973)
- Children: 4

May Warden (9 May 1891 – 5 October 1978) was an English actress and comedian.

== Career ==
Although she acted in other films and television shows, in Germany and Scandinavia she is best known for her role as Miss Sophie in the 1963 comedy sketch Dinner for One together with Freddie Frinton.

Warden had non-speaking roles in Stanley Kubrick's A Clockwork Orange and as an aged Sara Kingdom in the Doctor Who serial The Daleks' Master Plan. She also made a guest appearance in Dad's Army as Mrs Dowding in "The Bullet Is Not for Firing". Her last major role was as Billy's outspoken grandmother in the TV series Billy Liar (1973).

== Personal life and death ==
Warden married comedian Silvester Stuart in 1915. They had four children, two sons and two daughters, two of whom also went on to act on the stage. Her husband died on 12 August 1973. She lived in London until her death on 5 October 1978, aged 87.
