= Cascading strings =

Music arrangement technique

Cascading strings (also sometimes known as "tumbling strings") is an arrangement technique of British light music. This technique is associated in the U.S. with the style of easy listening known as beautiful music. The cascading strings effect was first developed by British composer/arranger Ronald Binge in 1951 for Annunzio Paolo Mantovani and his Mantovani Orchestra, with whom the sound would be most associated.

In 1951, record label Decca wanted Mantovani's 12-piece orchestra to produce something that would rival the big American concert orchestras. Binge, a musician in Mantovani's orchestra, had already been experimenting with arrangements that might replicate the long reverberating sound of composer Claudio Monteverdi, who had written works to take advantage of the spatial properties of the acoustic in large cathedrals. He now suggested that they dramatically increase the size of the string section of the orchestra. Decca invested in the expensive idea, which Mantovani called "a mass of strings." Work began on an album to be released in 1952, which would make Mantovani famous worldwide.

When given the arrangement for what would become their first hit, "Charmaine," Mantovani had misgivings. "When we played it, it really sounded beautiful and the whole of the orchestra was delighted with it. Well, when an orchestra is delighted, I start worrying. It’s too good, as a rule: musicians’ music." Soloist Max Jaffa recalled that nobody had expected the sound; "it came as a complete surprise." In a 1996 radio interview, violinist Sidney Sax recalled:

What it is, is a delayed sound. You have a chord structure and chords move along together and what Binge would do, he would take one note away from the chord and shift it into the next bar and it would create a different sound. It sounded as though you had left something behind – an echo. It was such a wonderful, unusual sound. My colleagues and I thought we had heard everything from symphonies to foxtrots, and suddenly there was this new sound. Ronnie had produced something which nobody had ever produced before.

The arrangements were difficult to play. Multiple string sections would play the same notes, at the same volume, but slightly behind each other. To avoid playing in unison required intense concentration. If the various sections played at different volumes, the effect would be too dissonant and pulsing. The violinists had to maintain intonation in the high registers, so to give warmth and richness to the music the violas were voiced very close to the cellos.

In addition to the "echo" effect, the violins achieved a "cascading" effect by performing runs or arpeggios over melodies in the lower strings.

U.S. Record producers Hugo and Luigi also did a series of recordings under the name "Cascading Voices" and later "Cascading Strings."

One effect of the cascading strings technique is to emulate the acoustic properties of a large hall such as a cathedral, through simulated reverberation. The effect is achieved in an orchestra using multiple string sections, which would play slightly different parts from one another, in a cascading effect, thus creating the illusion of reverberation of the original sound.
