= An Album of Favourite Waltzes =

Studio album by Mantovani and His Orchestra
- Released: 1952
- Genre: Easy listening
- Labels: Decca, London

An Album of Favourite Waltzes, also known as A Collection of Favorite Waltzes, is an album by Mantovani and His Orchestra. It was released in April 1952 by London Records in the United States (catalog no. LL-570) and in October 1952 by Decca Records in the United Kingdom (catalog no. LK-4051).

Upon its release, Billboard magazine gave the album a score of 82 out of 100 and called it "a top-notch disk for pleasant dancing or just listening and dreaming."

It was later reissued on compact disc along with another Mantovani album, "An Album of Favorite Tangos".

== Track listing ==
Side A

1. "Dear Love, My Love"
2. "Greensleeves"
3. "Mexicali Rose"
4. "It Happened in Monterey"
5. "Poème"
6. "I Love You Truly"

Side B

1. "Love Lady"
2. "Love, Here Is My Heart"
3. "At Dawning"
4. "Was It A Dream?"
5. "Love's Roundabout"
6. "Dancing With Tears In My Eyes"
