= Plays Tangos =

Studio album by Mantovani and His Orchestra
- Released: 1953
- Genre: Easy listening
- Label: London

Plays Tangos is an album by Mantovani and His Orchestra. It was released in 1953 by London Recordings (catalog no. LL 768). Upon its release, Billboard magazine wrote that it was a collection of "impeccable performances" that "are all perfect for either dancing or listening." AllMusic later gave the album a rating of four-and-a-half stars.

== Track listing ==
Side 1

1. "Jealousy" (Gade)
2. "A media luz" (Donato)
3. "Arana de la Noche" (Manilla)
4. "Bésame Mucho" (Velasquez, Wilke, Skylar)
5. Tango de la Luna" (Manilla)
6. "Red Petticoats" (Mantovani)

Side 2

1. "Adios Muchachos" (Raven, Vedani, Sanders)
2. "Blaue Himmel (Blue Sky)" (Rixner)
3. "El Choclo" (Villoldo, Bary)
4. "La Cumparsita" (Rodriguez)
5. "Chiquita Mia" (King, Remy)
6. "Tango delle Rose" (Bottero, Schrier)
