= All-American Showcase =

Studio album by Mantovani and His Orchestra
- Released: 1959
- Genre: Easy listening
- Label: London
- Producer: Frank Lee

Mantovani and His Orchestra chronology
Film Encores Vol. 2 (1959)	All-American Showcase (1959)	American Scene (1959)

All-American Showcase is a double album of music by four American composers performed by the Anglo-Italian conductor Mantovani and His Orchestra. It was released in 1959 by London Recordings (catalog nos. PSA 3202 and LL 3122/3). Each of the four sides is dedicated to one of four composers: Sigmund Romberg, Victor Herbert, Irving Berlin, and Rudolf Friml. It debuted on Billboard magazine's pop album chart on January 4, 1960, peaked at the No. 8 spot, and remained on the chart for 18 weeks. AllMusic later gave it a rating of three stars.

== Track listing ==
Side A

1. "Lover Come Back to Me" (Sigmund Romberg)
2. "When I Grow Too Old to Dream" (Sigmund Romberg)
3. "Softly, as in a Mountain Sunrise" (Sigmund Romberg)
4. "The Desert Song" (Sigmund Romberg)
5. "Will You Remember" (Sigmund Romberg)
6. Serenade from "The Student Prince" (Sigmund Romberg)

Side B

1. "Ah! Sweet Mysteries of Life" (Victor Herbert)
2. "A Kiss in the Dark" (Victor Herbert)
3. "Sweethearts" (Victor Herbert)
4. "I'm Falling in Love with Someone" (Victor Herbert)
5. "Indian Summer" (Victor Herbert)
6. "Kiss Me Again" (Victor Herbert)

Side C

1. "The Girl That I Marry" (Irving Berlin)
2. "Marie" (Irving Berlin)
3. "(You Forgot to) Remember" (Irving Berlin)
4. "Always" (Irving Berlin)
5. "For the Very First Time" (Irving Berlin)
6. "What'll I Do" (Irving Berlin)

Side D

1. "Love Everlasting" (Rudolf Friml)
2. "Rose Marie" (Rudolf Friml)
3. "Only a Rose" (Rudolf Friml)
4. "The Donkey Serenade" (Rudolf Friml)
5. "Sympathy" (Rudolf Friml)
6. "Indian Love Call" (Rudolf Friml)
