= Song Hits from Theatreland =

Studio album by Mantovani and His Orchestra
- Released: 1955
- Genre: Easy listening
- Label: Decca

Waltz Time chronology
1955 (Waltzes of Irving Berlin)	Song Hits from Theatreland (1955)	1956

Song Hits from Theatreland is an album by Mantovani and His Orchestra. It was released in 1955 by Decca (catalog no. LK 4112). It debuted on Billboard magazine's pop album chart on July 9, 1955, peaked at the No. 8 spot, and remained on the chart for eight weeks. It was an RIAA certified gold album (minimum 500,000 units sold). AllMusic later gave the album a rating of three stars.

== Track listing ==
Side 1

1. "If I Loved You" (from Carousel) (Rodgers, Hammerstein)
2. "Wunderbar" (from Kiss Me Kate) (Cole Porter)
3. "I've Never Been in Love Before" (from Guys and Dolls) (Loesser)
4. "Bewitched" (from Pal Joey) (Rodgers, Hart)
5. "I Talk to the Trees" (from Paint Your Wagon) (Loewe, Lerner)
6. "Some Enchanted Evening" (from South Pacific) (Rodgers, Hammerstein)

Side 2

1. "Out of My Dreams" (from Oklahoma) (Rodgers, Hammerstein)
2. "Stranger in Paradise" (from Kismet) (George Forrest, Robert Craig Wright)
3. "C'Est Magnifique" (from Can-Can) (Cole Porter)
4. "Almost Like Being in Love" (from Brigadoon) (Lerner, Loewe)
5. "Hello, Young Lovers" (from The King and I) (Rodgers, Hammerstein)
6. "They Say It's Wonderful" (from Annie Get Your Gun) (Irving Berlin)

== Certifications ==
Region	Certification	Certified units/sales
United States (RIAA)	Gold	500,000^{^}
^{^} Shipments figures based on certification alone.
