= Mantovani Plays Music from Exodus and Other Great Themes =

Studio album by Mantovani and His Orchestra
- Released: 1960
- Genre: Easy listening
- Label: London

Mantovani and His Orchestra chronology
Songs to Remember (1960)	Mantovani Plays Music from Exodus and Other Great Themes (1960)	Operetta Memories (1961)

Mantovani Plays Music from Exodus and Other Great Themes is an album by Mantovani and His Orchestra. It was released in 1960 by London (catalog no. LL-3231). It debuted on Billboard magazine's pop album chart on December 5, 1960, held the No. 2 spot for five weeks, and remained on the chart for 44 weeks. It was an RIAA certified gold album (minimum 500,000 units sold). AllMusic later gave the album a rating of four-and-a-half stars.

== Track listing ==
Side A

1. "Exodus"
2. "Karen"
3. "A Summer Place"
4. "The Green Leaves of Summer"
5. "Song Without End"
6. "Seventy-Six Trombones"

Side B

1. "The Sundowners"
2. "Irma La Douce"
3. "I Love Paris"
4. "Mr. Wonderful"
5. "The Carousel Waltz"
6. "The Sound of Music"

== Certifications ==
Region	Certification	Certified units/sales
United States (RIAA)	Gold	500,000^{^}
^{^} Shipments figures based on certification alone.
