= Christmas Carols (album) =

Studio album by Mantovani and His Orchestra
- Released: 1953
- Genre: Christmas
- Label: London

Christmas Carols is an album of Christmas music by Mantovani and His Orchestra. It was originally released in 1953 by London Records (LL 913). It was recorded at Kingsway Hall in London with Charles Smart playing Kingsway Hall's organ. The album was re-recorded in stereo in 1958 (PS 142). The album includes an original Mantovani composition, "Midnight Waltz".

It was reissued from year to year at the holiday season. It appeared on the Billboard magazine pop album chart in 1957 (No. 4), 1958 (No. 3), 1959 (No. 16), 1960 (No. 8), and 1962 (No. 36). It is an RIAA certified gold album (minimum 500,000 units sold).

AllMusic later gave the album a rating of three stars.

== Track listing ==
Side A

1. "The First Noel"
2. "Hark! The Herald Angels Sing"
3. "God Rest You Merry, Gentlemen"
4. "White Christmas"
5. "Good King Wenceslas"
6. "O Holy Night"
7. "Adeste Fideles"

Side B

1. "Joy to the World"
2. "Silent Night, Holy Night"
3. "O Tannenbaum"
4. "Midnight Waltz" (original Mantovani composition)
5. "Nazareth"
6. "O Little Town of Bethlehem"
7. "The Skater's Waltz"

== Certifications ==
Region	Certification	Certified units/sales
United States (RIAA)	Gold	500,000^{^}
^{^} Shipments figures based on certification alone.
