= Burnie Peacock =

American jazz musician

Bernard L. "Burnie" Peacock (or Bernie, or Burney) (June 2, 1921 – December 6, 1997) was an American jazz saxophonist.

Peacock learned to play clarinet in his youth before starting on alto saxophone as a teenager. By 1938 he had quit school in Tennessee to move to Detroit, playing in local bands, then joined Jimmy Raschel's band in Chicago. He enlisted in the United States Navy in 1942, playing in military bands until 1945. After the end of the war he played with Don Redman and worked extensively with Lucky Millinder's band between 1945 and 1953, including on smaller sessions with Millinder sidemen, directed by Panama Francis and Bull Moose Jackson. He then worked with Cab Calloway and joined Count Basie's orchestra briefly in 1948-49. He was with Bull Moose Jackson again in the early 1950s, and also led Earl Bostic's band while Bostic recovered from a car crash. Starting in 1952 he led his own band, which did USO tours for troops during the Korean War.
