= Gems Forever =

Studio album by Mantovani and His Orchestra
- Released: 1958
- Genre: Easy listening
- Label: London

Mantovani and His Orchestra chronology
Mantovani Plays Tangos (1958)	Gems Forever (1958)	Strauss Waltzes (1958)

Gems Forever is an album by Mantovani and His Orchestra. It was released in 1958 by London (catalog no. PS-106). It debuted on Billboard magazine's pop album chart on May 19, 1958, peaked at the No. 5 spot, and remained on the chart for 56 weeks. It was an RIAA certified gold album (minimum 500,000 units sold). AllMusic later gave the album a rating of four-and-a-half stars.

== Track listing ==
Side A

1. "All the Things You Are"
2. "True Love"
3. "I Could Have Danced All Night"
4. "You Keep Coming Back Like a Song"
5. "A Woman in Love"
6. "This Nearly Was Mine"

Side B

1. "Summertime"
2. "Something to Remember You By"
3. "Love Letters"
4. "The Nearness of You"
5. "An Affair to Remember (Our Love Affair)"
6. Hey There"

== Certifications ==
Region	Certification	Certified units/sales
United States (RIAA)	Gold	500,000^{^}
^{^} Shipments figures based on certification alone.
