= Mantovani and His Orchestra Play the Music of Victor Herbert =

Studio album by Mantovani and his orchestra
- Released: 1953
- Genre: Easy listening
- Label: London

The Music of Victor Herbert is an album by Mantovani featuring his orchestral interpretations of selected compositions by Victor Herbert.

== Release ==
The album was originally issued by London Records in 1953 on a 12-inch LP (cat. no. LL 746).

== Critical reception ==
Professional ratings
Review scores
Source	Rating
Billboard	(favorable)

Billboard reviewed the album in the issue dated April 18, 1953, writing: "The recommendation to dealers on this one is a simple one – buy and promote this set. It's a powerhouse coupling of top Victor Herbert operetta tunes rendered by the shimmering and lush strings that have become the hallmark of the Mantavani ork."

== Chart performance ==
The album reached No. 1 on the 33⅓ R.P.M. half of Billboard's Best Selling Popular Albums chart.

== Track listing ==
12-inch LP (London LL 746)

All music is composed by Victor Herbert.

Side 1
No.	Title	Note(s)	Length
1.	"Ah! Sweet Mystery of Life"	Naughty Marietta
2.	"When You're Away"	The Only Girl
3.	"Neapolitan Love Song"	Princess Pat
4.	"March of the Toys"	Babes in Toyland
5.	"I'm Falling in Love with Someone"	Naughty Marietta
6.	"Gypsy Love Song"	The Fortune Teller
7.	"Kiss Me Again"	Mlle. Modiste

Side 2
No.	Title	Note(s)	Length
1.	"Indian Summer"	An American Idyll
2.	"To the Land of My Own Romance"	The Enchantress
3.	"Italian Street Song"	Naughty Marietta
4.	"A Kiss in the Dark"	Orange Blossoms
5.	"Habanera"	Natoma
6.	"Sweethearts"	Sweethearts
7.	"The Irish Have a Great Day Tonight"	Eileen

== Personnel ==
- Mantovani and his orchestra

== Charts ==
Chart (1953)	Peak position
US Billboard Best Selling Classicals	2
US Billboard Best Selling Popular Albums – 33⅓ R.P.M.	1

== See also ==
- List of Billboard number-one albums of 1953
