= Italia Mia =

Studio album by Mantovani and His Orchestra
- Released: 1961
- Genre: Easy listening
- Label: Decca

Mantovani and His Orchestra chronology
| Operetta Memories (1961) | Italia Mia (1961) | Themes from Broadway (1961) |

Italia Mia is an album of Italian music by Mantovani and His Orchestra. It was released in 1961 by Decca Records (catalog no. LK 4396). It debuted on Billboard magazine's pop album chart on June 26, 1961, peaked at the No. 8 spot, and remained on the chart for 15 weeks. AllMusic later gave it a rating of four-and-a-half stars.

== Track listing ==
Side A

1. "Catari, Catari"
2. Theme from "Capriccio Italien"
3. Italia Mia - My Italy (Mantovani)
4. Vissi D'Arte - Love and Music from "Tosca"
5. "Mattinata"
6. Variation on "Carnival of Venice"

Side B

1. "Bersaglieri March"
2. "Come Back To Sorrento" - "Torna a Surriento"
3. "Return to Me"
4. "Nessun Dorma" - "None Shall Sleep" from "Turandot"
5. Italian Fantasia Medley: "Tarantella"; "O Sole Mio"; "A Frangesa"; "Santa Lucia"; "Maria Mari!"; "Funiculi Funicula"
