= Film Encores Volume 2 =

Film Encores Vol. 2

Studio album by Mantovani and His Orchestra
- Released: 1959
- Genre: Easy listening
- Label: London

Mantovani and His Orchestra chronology
Mantovani Stereo Showcase (1959)	Film Encores Vol. 2 (1959)	All-American Showcase (1959)

Film Encores Vol. 2 is an album by Mantovani and His Orchestra. It was released in 1959 by London (catalog nos. LL-3117 and LK-4316).

It debuted on Billboard magazine's pop album chart on June 22, 1959, peaked at the No. 14 spot, and remained on the chart for 15 weeks.

AllMusic later gave the album a rating of three stars. Reviewer Stephen Cook praised Mantovani as one of the most innovative of string arrangers and wrote that this collection "provides ample proof of the maestro's golden way around both studio and orchestra. . . . the nonstop flow of gorgeous strings will make anybody's winter evening by the record player a rewarding one.

== Track listing ==
Side A

1. "The High and the Mighty" (Tiomkin, Washington)
2. "A Certain Smile" (Webster, Fain)
3. "Friendly Persuasion" (Tiomkin, Webster)
4. "Que Sera, Sera (Whatever Will Be, Will Be)" (Livingston, Evans)
5. "Tammy" (Livingston, Evans)
6. "Be My Love" (Cahn, Brodszky)

Side B

1. "April Love" (Webster, Fain)
2. "When You Wish Upon a Star" (Harline, Washington)
3. "Separate Tables" (Adamson, Warren)
4. "Around the World" (Young)
5. "Fascination" (Marchetti)
6. "Secret Love" (Webster, Fain)
