= American Waltzes =

Studio album by Mantovani and His Orchestra
- Released: 1962
- Genre: Easy listening
- Label: London

Mantovani and His Orchestra chronology
Themes from Broadway (1961)	American Waltzes (1962)	Moon River (1962)

American Waltzes is an album by Mantovani and His Orchestra. It was released in 1962 by London Recordings (catalog nos. LL-3260 and PS-248). It debuted on Billboard magazine's pop album chart on June 16, 1962, peaked at the No. 8 spot, and remained on the chart for 19 weeks. AllMusic later gave the album a rating of three stars.

== Track listing ==
Side A

1. "The Waltz You Saved for Me"
2. "Beautiful Ohio"
3. "When the Moon Comes Over the Mountain"
4. "Sidewalks of New York"
5. "Marcheta"
6. "The Whiffenpoof Song"

Side B

1. "A Garden in Granada"
2. "Let Me Call You Sweetheart"
3. "Missouri Waltz"
4. "The Sweetheart of Sigma Chi"
5. "Meet Me in St. Louis, Louis"
6. "Clementine"
7. "Alice Blue Gown"
