= Latin Rendezvous =

Studio album by Mantovani and His Orchestra
- Released: 1963
- Genre: Easy listening
- Label: Decca

Mantovani and His Orchestra chronology
| Moon River (1962) | Latin Rendezvous (1963) | The Incomparable Montavani (1964) |

Latin Rendezvous is an album by Mantovani and His Orchestra. It was released in 1963 by Decca Records (catalog nos. LK-4528 and PS-295). It debuted on Billboard magazine's pop album chart on June 1, 1963, peaked at the No. 10 spot, and remained on the chart for 13 weeks.

The album was later reissued on compact disc in combination with a subsequent Mantovani album, "Mantovani Ole" (1965). AllMusic gave the combined release a rating of four-and-a-half stars.

Professional ratings
Review scores
| Source | Rating |
|---|---|
| Allmusic | 4.5/5 stars |
| New Record Mirror | 4/5 stars |

== Track listing ==
Side A

1. "Malaguena"
2. "Perhaps, Perhaps, Perhaps"
3. "Be Mine Tonight"
4. "Cielito Lindo"
5. "La Paloma"
6. "Siboney"

Side B

1. "A Garden in Granada"
2. "Perfidia (Tonight)"
3. "Andalucia"
4. "Andalucia"
5. "La Golondrina"
6. "Maria Elena"
7. "Espana"
