= Continental Encores =

Studio album by Mantovani and His Orchestra
- Released: 1959
- Genre: Easy listening
- Label: Decca

Mantovani and His Orchestra chronology
Strauss Waltzes (1958)	Continental Encores (1959)	Mantovani Stereo Showcase (1959)

Continental Encores is an album by Mantovani and His Orchestra. It was released in 1959 by Decca Records (catalog no. SKL 4044). It debuted on Billboard magazine's pop album chart on February 16, 1959, peaked at the No. 13 spot, and remained on the chart for 31 weeks. AllMusic later gave it a rating of three stars.

== Track listing ==
Side A

1. "More Than Ever (Come Prima)"
2. La Vie en Rose"
3. "Under Paris Skies (Songs le Ciel de Paris)
4. "O Mein Papa"
5. "April in Portugal (Avril au Portugal)
6. "Arrivederci Roma"

Side B

1. "Anema e Core (To Be or Not to Be)"
2. "La Mer"
3. "I Only Know I Love You (Na Voce, Na Chtarra, E'o Poco E'Luna)"
4. "Autumn Leaves"
5. "Answer Me (Mutterlein)"
6. "Poppa Piccolino (Papavieri e Papere)
