= Songs to Remember (Mantovani album) =

Studio album by Mantovani and His Orchestra
- Released: 1960
- Genre: Easy listening
- Label: Decca

Mantovani and His Orchestra chronology
| American Scene (1959) | Songs to Remember (1960) | Exodus (1960) |

Songs to Remember is an album by Mantovani and His Orchestra. It was released in 1960 by London (catalog nos. SKL-4086 and LL-3149).

It debuted on Billboard magazine's pop album chart on July 25, 1960, peaked at the No. 21 spot, and remained on the chart for 18 weeks.

AllMusic later gave the album a rating of four-and-a-half stars.

== Track listing ==
Side A

1. "With These Hands"
2. "Faraway Places"
3. "A Very Precious Love"
4. "Jamaica Farewell"
5. "Tenderly"
6. "Blue Star"

Side B

1. "Gigi"
2. "When I Fall in Love"
3. "No Other Love"
4. "Vaya Con Dios"
5. "Two Different Worlds"
6. "Tonight"
