= Royal Ballet Sinfonia =

The Royal Ballet Sinfonia is the orchestra of Birmingham Royal Ballet.

The Sinfonia appears with Birmingham Royal Ballet in its home town, in London and around the UK, and frequently appears with The Royal Ballet at the Royal Opera House and on tour. It is the most regularly contracted ballet orchestra in the country, and appears and tours with many different ballet companies.

In 2006 the Sinfonia entered the UK Singles Chart at number 29 with a new recording of the Radio 4 UK Theme.

The current musical director of the orchestra is Paul Murphy.
