= Film Encores =

Studio album by Mantovani and His Orchestra
- Released: 1957
- Genre: Easy listening
- Label: London

Mantovani and His Orchestra chronology
Waltzes of Irving Berlin (1956)	Film Encores (1957)	Mantovani Plays Tangos (1958)

Film Encores is an album by Mantovani and His Orchestra. It was released in 1957 by London (catalog no. LL-1700). It debuted on Billboard magazine's pop album chart on May 27, 1957, peaked at the No. 1 spot, and remained on the chart for 113 weeks. It was an RIAA certified gold album (minimum 500,000 units sold). AllMusic later gave the album a rating of three stars.

== Track listing ==
Side A

1. "My Foolish Heart"
2. "Unchained Melody"
3. "Over the Rainbow"
4. "Summertime in Venice"
5. "Intermezzo"
6. "Three Coins in the Fountain"

Side B

1. "Love Is a Many Splendored Thing"
2. "Laura"
3. "High Noon"
4. "Hi-Lili, Hi-Lo"
5. "September Song"
6. Theme from "Limelight"

== Certifications ==
Region	Certification	Certified units/sales
United States (RIAA)	Gold	500,000^{^}
^{^} Shipments figures based on certification alone.
