= American Scene =

Studio album by Mantovani and His Orchestra
- Released: 1959
- Genre: Easy listening
- Label: Decca

Mantovani and His Orchestra chronology
| All-American Showcase (1959) | American Scene (1959) | Songs to Remember (1960) |

American Scene is an album of music by American songwriters performed by the Anglo-Italian conductor, Mantovani and His Orchestra. Side 1 consists entirely of music composed by Stephen Foster. It was released in 1959 by Decca Records (catalog no. SKL 4073). It debuted on Billboard magazine's pop album chart on March 28, 1960, peaked at the No. 11 spot, and remained on the chart for 30 weeks. AllMusic later gave it a rating of three stars.

== Track listing ==
Side 1

1. "My Old Kentucky Home" (Stephen Foster, arranged by Milner)
2. "Camptown Races" (Stephen Foster, arranged by Milner)
3. "I Dream of Jeannie" (Stephen Foster, arranged by Mantovani)
4. "Old Folks at Home" (Stephen Foster, arranged by Milner)
5. "Ring de Banjo" (Stephen Foster, arranged by Milner)
6. "Beautiful Dreamer" (Stephen Foster, arranged by Mantovani)

Side 2

1. "Home on the Range" (arranged by Mantovani)
2. "Grandfather's Clock" (arranged by Mantovani)
3. "Yellow Rose of Texas" (George)
4. Just A-Wearyin' for You" (Carrie Jacobs-Bond, arranged by Mantovani)
5. "Turkey in the Straw" (arranged by Milner)
6. "Goodnight, Irene" (Ledbetter)
