= Strauss Waltzes (Mantovani album) =

Studio album by Mantovani and His Orchestra
- Released: 1958
- Genre: Easy listening
- Label: Decca

Mantovani and His Orchestra chronology
Gems Forever (1958)	Strauss Waltzes (1958)	Continental Encores (1959)

Strauss Waltzes is an album of music composed by Johann Strauss II and performed by Mantovani and His Orchestra. It was released in 1958 by London (catalog no. PS 118). It debuted on Billboard magazine's pop album chart on November 24, 1958, peaked at the No. 7 spot, and remained on the chart for 24 weeks. It was an RIAA certified gold album (minimum 500,000 units sold).

== Track listing ==
Side 1

1. "Blue Danube"
2. "Voices of Spring"
3. "Roses from the South"
4. "Emperor Waltz"
5. "A Thousand and One Nights"
6. "Treasure Waltz"

Side 2

1. "Village Swallows"
2. "Wine, Women and Song"
3. "Acceleration Waltz"
4. "Tales from the Vienna Woods"
5. "Morning Papers (Morgenblätter)"
6. "You and You (Du und Du)"

== Certifications ==
Region	Certification	Certified units/sales
United States (RIAA)	Gold	500,000^{^}
^{^} Shipments figures based on certification alone.
