= Ronald Binge =

British composer and arranger (1910–1979)

- Born: 15 July 1910; Derby, Derbyshire, England
- Died: 6 September 1979 (aged 69) Ringwood, Hampshire, England
- Genres: Light music
- Occupation: Composer
- Formerly of: Mantovani

Ronald Binge (15 July 1910 – 6 September 1979) was a British composer and arranger of light music. He arranged many of Mantovani's most famous pieces before composing his own music, which included Elizabethan Serenade and Sailing By.

External audio
- You may hear Ronald Binge's Elizabethan Serenade as performed by Annunzio Mantovani and the Mantovani Orchestra in 1971 Here on archive.org

== Biography ==
Binge was born in a working-class neighbourhood in Derby, Derbyshire, in the English Midlands. In his childhood, he was a chorister at Saint Andrew's Church (Church of England), London Road, Derby — "the railwaymen's church" — demolished in 1970. Binge was educated at the Derby School of Music, where he studied the organ. Early in his career, he was a cinema organist and later worked in summer orchestras in British seaside resorts (including Blackpool and Great Yarmouth), for which he learned to play the piano accordion. Binge's skill as a cinema organist was put to good use, and he played the organ in Mantovani's first band, the Tipica Orchestra. During the Second World War, he served in the Royal Air Force, during which time he was in high demand for organising in-camp entertainment.

After the war, Mantovani offered Binge the job of arranging and composing for his new orchestra. With Mantovani, Binge also orchestrated Noël Coward's musicals Pacific 1860 (1946) and Ace of Clubs (1950). In 1951, his arrangement of "Charmaine" gave him and Mantovani worldwide success and recognition. However, he tired of writing arrangements and turned to composing original works and film scores. Mantovani's orchestra began playing his light orchestral pieces for radio broadcasts. In 1952, Binge devised and conducted his own BBC radio programme, String Song, which featured many of his compositions. He regularly composed for production and library music publishers, and a number of his works were used for radio and television signature tunes.

=== Family ===
Binge married Vera Simmons in 1945. During the 1950s, they lived at 18, Smitham Bottom Lane in Purley, Croydon. They had two children.

He died in Ringwood, Hampshire, of liver cancer in 1979, aged 69, survived by his wife, son and daughter.

== Compositions ==
Binge was interested in the technicalities of composition and was most famous as the inventor of the "cascading strings" effect that is the signature sound of the Mantovani orchestra, used in their arrangements of popular music. First heard on the hit Charmaine (1951), it was originally created to capture the essence of the echo properties of a building such as a cathedral, although it later became particularly associated with easy-listening music.

Binge's catalogue includes hundreds of works, most of them light orchestral. His first big compositional success was the orchestral overture Spitfire, composed in Blackpool while he was still on RAF service, which predated William Walton's orchestral tribute by a year. Best known today is probably Elizabethan Serenade (1951), which was used by the British Broadcasting Corporation as the theme for the popular 1950s series, "Music Tapestry", and as the play-out for the British Forces Network radio station, and for which in 1957 he won an Ivor Novello Award. It was later turned into a vocal version called "Where the Gentle Avon Flows", with lyrics by the poet Christopher Hassall. A reggae version of the tune, "Elizabethan Reggae", was performed by Boris Gardiner in 1970.

Binge is also known for Sailing By (1963), which introduces the late-night Shipping Forecast on BBC Radio 4. Other well-known pieces include Miss Melanie (used as the theme for the CBS Network's radio comedy The Couple Next Door from 1957 to 1960), Like Old Times, The Watermill (1958) for oboe and strings (used as the theme for the BBC children's series The Secret Garden), and his Concerto for Alto Saxophone in E-flat major (1956). His largest, longest, and most ambitious work is the four-movement Symphony in C (or Saturday Symphony), which was written during his retirement between 1966 and 1968, and performed in Britain and Germany. It was issued as a recording by the South German Radio Orchestra, conducted by the composer.

== Selected works ==
- Spitfire (1940)
- Madrugado (1945)
- Trade Winds (1946)
- The Red Sombrero (1947)
- Vice Versa, palindrome for piano (1948)
- Scherzo: Allegro molto (1951)
- Elizabethan Serenade (1952)
- High Stepper (The 'Aggie' Theme) (1952)
- Prelude: The Whispering Valley (1952)
- Impressions of London, suite (1953)
- Scottish Rhapsody (1953)
- Cornet Carillon (for brass band) (1954)
- String Song (1955)
- The Watermill (1955)
- Cockles and Mussels (1956)
- The Dance of the Snowflakes (1956)
- Saxophone Concerto (1956)
- Miss Melanie (1956)
- Faire Frou-Frou (1957)
- Man in a Hurry (1957)
- Las Castañuelas (1960)
- Thames Rhapsody (1960)
- Venetian Carnival (1960)
- Sailing By (1963)
- Saturday Symphony (1966–1968)
- Festival Te Deum (1970)
- Dual for Conductors, for brass band and orchestra (1976)

=== Film scores ===
- 13 Men and a Gun (1938)
- Once a Sinner (1950)
- Desperate Moment (1953)
- Our Girl Friday (1953)
- The Large Rope (1953)
- Adventure in the Hopfields (1954)
- Dance Little Lady (1954)
- The Runaway Bus (1954)
