= Mantovani =

Anglo-Italian conductor, composer, and entertainer (1905–1980)

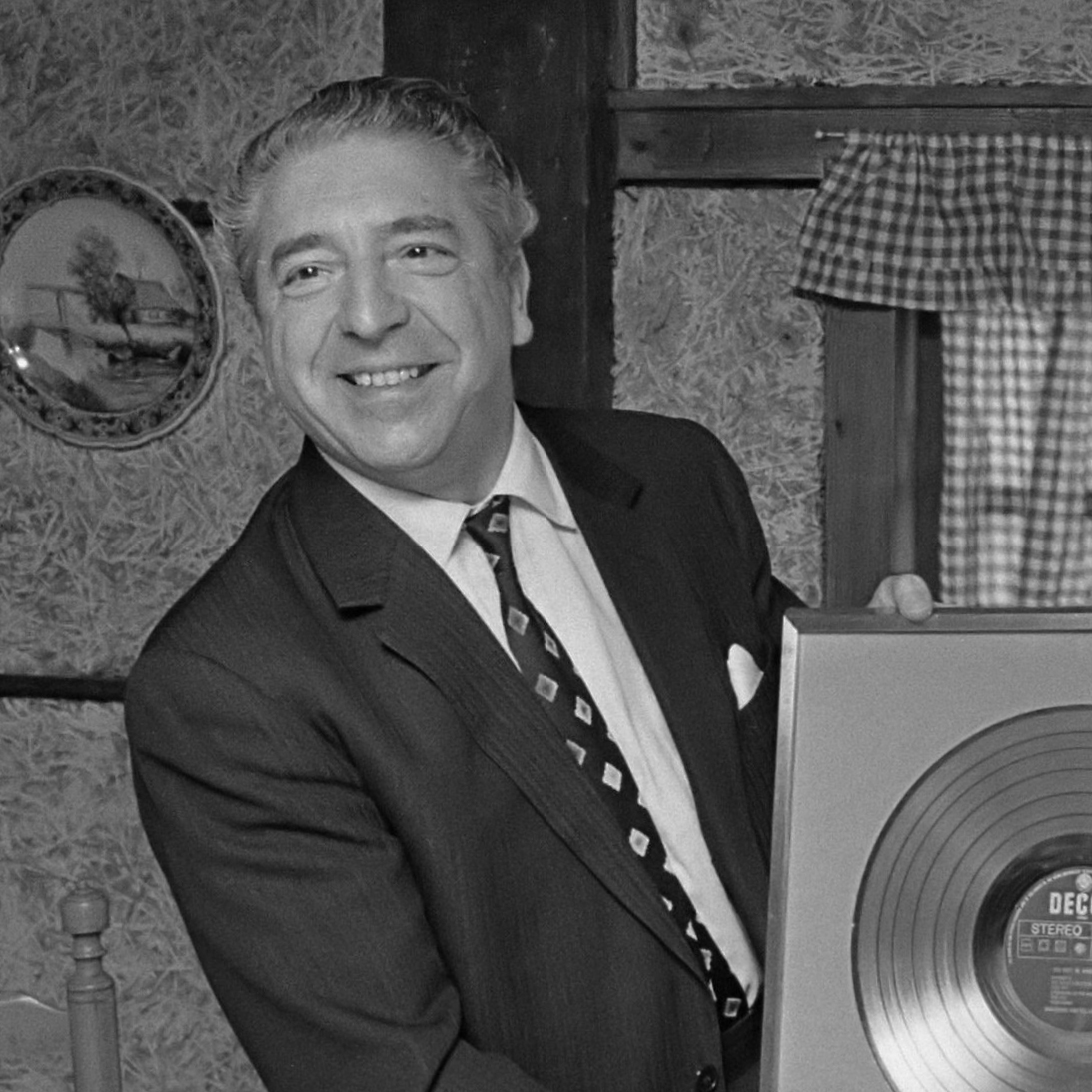
- Mantovani in 1970

Background information
- Also known as: Tulio Trapani
- Born: Annunzio Paolo Mantovani; 15 November 1905; Venice, Veneto, Italy
- Died: 30 March 1980 (aged 74) Royal Tunbridge Wells, Kent, England
- Genre: Light music
- Occupations: Conductor; composer
- Years active: 1939–1980

Annunzio Paolo Mantovani (Italian: [anˈnuntsjo ˈpaːolo mantoˈvaːni]; 15 November 1905 – 30 March 1980) was an Italian British conductor, composer and light orchestra–styled entertainer with a cascading strings musical signature.

The book British Hit Singles & Albums stated that Mantovani was "Britain's most successful album act before the Beatles ... the first act to sell over one million stereo albums and [have] six albums simultaneously in the US Top 30 in 1959".

== Biography ==
Mantovani was born on 15 November 1905 in Venice, Italy, into a musical family. His father, Benedetto Paolo "Bismarck" Mantovani, was a violinist and served as the concertmaster of La Scala opera house's orchestra in Milan, under the baton of Arturo Toscanini. The family moved to England in 1912, where young Annunzio studied at Trinity College of Music in London. After graduation, he formed his own orchestra, which played in and around Birmingham. Mantovani married Winifred Moss (1909–1977) in 1934, having two children: Kenneth (born 12 July 1935) and Paula Irene (born 11 April 1939). By the time World War II broke out, his orchestra was one of the most popular British dance bands, both on BBC radio broadcasts and in live performances.

Mantovani was also musical director for a large number of musicals and other plays, including Noël Coward's Pacific 1860 (1946) and Vivian Ellis's musical setting of J. B. Fagan's And So to Bed (1951). After the war, Mantovani concentrated on recording and eventually gave up live performance altogether. He worked with arranger and composer Ronald "Ronnie" Binge, who developed the "cascading strings" effect (also known as the "Mantovani sound"). Mantovani's records were regularly used for demonstration purposes in stores selling hi-fi stereo equipment, as they were produced and arranged for stereo reproduction. He became the first person to sell a million stereophonic records. In 1952, Binge ceased to arrange for Mantovani but the distinctive sound of the orchestra remained.

Mantovani recorded for Decca and London Records, the United States arm of the Decca Record Company, exclusively. He recorded in excess of 50 albums on that label, many of which were Top 40 hits. Mantovani's single tracks included "The Song from Moulin Rouge", which reached number one in the UK Singles Chart in 1953, the first instrumental track ever to do so; "Cara Mia" (with him and his orchestra backing David Whitfield) in 1954; "Around the World" in 1957; and "Main Theme from Exodus (Ari's Theme)" in 1960. In the United States, between 1955 and 1972, Mantovani released more than 40 albums, with 27 reaching the Top 40, and 11 in the Top Ten. His biggest success came with the album Film Encores, which reached number one in 1957.

Similarly, Mantovani Plays Music From 'Exodus' and Other Great Themes made it to the Top Ten in 1961, with over a million albums sold.

Mantovani starred in his own syndicated television series, Mantovani, which was produced in England and aired in the United States in 1959, and 39 episodes were filmed. Mantovani made his last recordings in the mid-1970s.

Mantovani died at a care home in Royal Tunbridge Wells, Kent, on 30 March 1980; he was 74 years old.

== Music style and influences ==
External audio
- You may hear Annunzio Mantovani conducting his Mantovani Orchestra in Elizabethan Serenade by Ronald Binge in 1971 Here on archive.org

The cascading strings technique developed by Binge became Mantovani's hallmark in such hits arranged by Binge as "Charmaine". Binge developed this technique to replicate the echo experienced in venues such as cathedrals, and he achieved this goal through arranging skill alone.

Author Joseph Lanza describes Mantovani's string arrangements as the most "rich and mellifluous" of the emerging light music style during the early 1950s. He stated that Mantovani was a leader in the use of new studio technologies to "create sound tapestries with innumerable strings", and that "the sustained hum of Mantovani's reverberated violins produced a sonic vaporizer foreshadowing the synthesizer harmonics of space music." His style survived through an ever-changing variety of musical styles prompting Variety to call him "the biggest musical phenomenon of the twentieth century".

From 1961 to 1971, David McCallum Sr was the leader of Mantovani's orchestra. At this time, his son David McCallum Jr was at the height of his acting fame, prompting Mantovani to introduce his leader to audiences with the quip, "We can afford the father but not the son!"

Mantovani is referred to by name in The Kinks song "Prince of the Punks" and Don Black and Andrew Lloyd Webber’s "Letter Home to England" in Tell Me on a Sunday. He also had a big influence on Brian May, Queen guitarist.

During his lifetime, Mantovani did not always get respect from his fellow musicians. When George Martin first suggested overdubbing Paul McCartney's recording of "Yesterday" with strings, McCartney's initial reaction, according to Martin, was that he did not want it sounding like Mantovani. Martin therefore used a more classical sound, employing a string quartet.

== Posthumous publishing ==
Much of his catalogue has reappeared on CD. There are also many compilations. A large number of CDs are available containing unauthorized recordings, billed as Mantovani or Mantovani Orchestra; for example, the CD titled "The Mantovani Orchestra" released in 1997 contained a track from the 1980s Andrew Lloyd Webber musical "Cats", which would have required posthumous conducting on the part of Mantovani. There have also been CDs released under the Mantovani name of recordings made by others while Mantovani was still alive.

Following Mantovani's death in 1980, the Mantovani Estate continues to authorize numerous concerts worldwide and recordings using original and newly commissioned arrangements.

== Discography ==
=== Selected albums ===
- Waltzing with Mantovani (1951)
- An Album of Favourite Waltzes (1952)
- The Music of Victor Herbert (1953)
- Plays Tangos (1953)
- Christmas Carols (1953)
- Song Hits from Theatreland (1955)
- Film Encores (1957)
- Gems Forever (1958)
- Strauss Waltzes (re-recording, 1958)
- Continental Encores (1959)
- Film Encores, Vol. 2 (1959)
- American Scene (1959)
- All-American Showcase (1959)
- Songs to Remember )1960)
- Mantovani Plays Music from Exodus and Other Great Themes (1960)
- Italia Mia (1961)
- American Waltzes (1962)
- Latin Rendezvous (1963)

== Selected filmography ==
- Sing as You Swing (1937)
- French Without Tears (1940)
- Guitars of Love (1954)
- A Heart Full of Music (1955)

== See also ==
- Mononymous persons
