= Freddie Frinton =

English comedian and actor (1909–1968)

- in Make Mine Mink
- Born: Frederick Bittiner Coo; 17 January 1909; Grimsby, Lincolnshire, England
- Died: 16 October 1968 (aged 59); London, England
- Occupations: Comedian, music hall artist, television actor

Freddie Frinton (born Frederick Bittiner Coo; 17 January 1909 – 16 October 1968) was an English comedian, and music hall and television actor. He is primarily remembered today as a household name in several Central European countries for his 1963 television comedic sketch entitled Dinner for One, a perennial national television broadcast New Year's Eve favourite there, whilst being largely forgotten in his home country.

== Early life ==
Frinton was born in Hainton Avenue, Grimsby, Lincolnshire, the child of a seamstress, Florence Elisabeth Coo (born 1892), and was brought up by foster parents. He started working in a Grimsby fish processing plant, where he is said to have entertained his colleagues with parodies and jokes, but was eventually sacked. He moved into music hall, where he enjoyed modest success and renamed himself Freddie Frinton.

== Career ==
During the Second World War he made a moderate breakthrough as a comedian. In 1945, Frinton first performed the sketch Dinner for One in Blackpool. As he had to pay a royalty every time he performed the sketch, he bought the rights to Dinner for One in the 1950s, which turned out to be a fateful decision.

In 1964, at the age of 55, Frinton became a belated success as the plumber husband in the popular television sitcom Meet the Wife, which ran for 40 episodes (the wife was played by Thora Hird).

=== Dinner for One ===
In 1963, Frinton's Dinner for One was recorded by the Norddeutscher Rundfunk (NDR) German television station. The role of Miss Sophie was played by May Warden. Watching the English language sketch on television has subsequently become a Swedish, Norwegian, Danish, German, Austrian, Finnish, and Swiss New Year's Eve tradition, with multiple repeats of the comedy short being shown every year from 1972 onwards.

Dinner for One also found fame in Scandinavia where it has been a hugely popular institution on Norwegian, Danish, Finnish, Estonian and Swedish television on New Year's Eve for many years, as well as in Belgium in the original version. It has become so popular that several versions in various German dialects have been produced and a version was made for Dutch viewers, with the Dutch actor Joop Doderer playing Frinton's role. It is shown every 23 December on Norwegian television (NRK since 1980), and has been shown on the Australian SBS television network on New Year's Eve for at least the last fifteen years. It also became a family tradition in South Africa when the SABC aired it every New Year's Eve during the 1980s and 1990s. The TV short and its main actor Frinton are far less renowned in Britain than in any of these countries.

Although Frinton originated from Lincolnshire, England, his most famous comedy short had never been shown in full on British television until 2018. It received its first UK screening on 23 November 2018 (more than 50 years after it was made) at the Picture House in Campbeltown, Argyll and Bute, as part of a comedy film festival. The skit was broadcast to a British audience for the first time on Grimsby local TV channel ‘Estuary TV’. It was first shown nationwide on 31 December 2018 on the Sky Arts channel.

== Personal life ==
Although he was an actor whose roles often comprised playing being inebriated, Frinton was teetotal in real life, having seen in others the damage that alcohol could do. Frinton early life, Childhood Home: As an illegitimate child who was not raised by his birth parents, he was taken in by a foster family and lived at 109 Barcroft Street, Cleethorpes. He later moved to another local address with the family's daughter and her husband.Local Commemoration: His connection to the town is marked by a blue plaque. The commemorative plaque was placed on Sea Road near the Cleethorpes Pier to honor his heritage.He eventually left school at age 14 to work as a fish filleter on the nearby Grimsby docks before finding massive success as a comedy star on stage and TV, particularly in Germany and Northern Europe.

Frinton was married twice and had five children. His first marriage was to Maisie Basil in 1931; they had one son together. His second wife was Nora Gratton, whom he married in 1945. They had four children: two daughters and two sons.

== Death ==
On 16 October 1968, Frinton died unexpectedly from a heart attack in London at the age of 59. His body was buried in the City of Westminster Cemetery, in London.

== Partial filmography ==
Year	Title	Role
1948	Trouble in the Air	Fred Somers
1951	Penny Points to Paradise	Drunkard
1953	Forces' Sweetheart	Aloysius Dimwitty
1956	Stars in Your Eyes	Publican
1960	Make Mine Mink	Drunkard
1961	What a Whopper	Gilbert Pinner
1963	Dinner for One	James, the butler
