= Lawes =

Lawes is the surname of the following people:

- Andrea Lawes (born 1962), Canadian female curler
- Arthur Lawes, 20th century rugby league footballer
- Courtney Lawes (born 1989), rugby union player
- Frank Lawes, English composer
- Henry Lawes, English musician and composer
- John Bennet Lawes, English entrepreneur and agricultural scientist
- John Lawes (company director), Australian company director and former chairman of QBE Insurance
- Jon Lawes, English motoring author
- Kaitlyn Lawes (born 1988), Canadian female curler, Olympic and World champion
- Lewis Lawes, prison warden and an outspoken proponent of prison reform
- Nicholas Lawes, Governor of Jamaica from 1718 to 1722.
- Princess Lawes (1945-2024), Jamaican politician
- Tom Lawes (born 2002), English cricketer
- Vitel Lawes, West Indian cricketer
- William Lawes, English composer and musician
- William George Lawes, New Guinea pioneer missionary

== See also ==
- Lawes's parotia
- Sir John Lawes School
- Lawes, Queensland, a locality in Australia
