= 1970 in British music =

This is a summary of 1970 in music in the United Kingdom, including the official charts from that year.

== Events ==
- 4 January – The Who drummer Keith Moon fatally runs over his chauffeur with his Bentley while trying to escape a mob outside a pub. The death is later ruled an accident.
- 16 January – John Lennon's London art gallery exhibit of lithographs, Bag One, is shut down by Scotland Yard for displaying "erotic lithographs"
- 26 January – Simon & Garfunkel release their final album together, Bridge Over Troubled Water. It tops the album chart at regular intervals over the next two years, and becomes the best-selling album in Britain during the 1970s.
- 11 February – The film The Magic Christian, starring Peter Sellers and Ringo Starr, is premiered in New York City. The film's soundtrack album, including Badfinger's "Come and Get It" (written and produced by Paul McCartney), is released on Apple Records.
- 14 February – The Who records Live at Leeds in Yorkshire, England.
- 28 February – Led Zeppelin perform in Copenhagen under the pseudonym The Nobs, to avoid a threatened lawsuit by Count Eva von Zeppelin, descendant of airship designer Ferdinand von Zeppelin.
- 19 March – David Bowie marries model Angela Barnett.
- 21 March – British-born singer Dana wins the 15th annual Eurovision Song Contest for Ireland with the song "All Kinds of Everything".
- 10 April – Paul McCartney publicly announces the break-up of The Beatles. His first solo album is released 10 days later.
- 8 May – The Beatles' last album, Let It Be, is released.
- 16 May – The Who release Live at Leeds which is their first live album. Since its initial reception, Live at Leeds has been cited by several music critics as the best live rock recording of all time.
- 23/24 May – Hollywood Festival, Newcastle-under-Lyme is staged featuring a line-up including The Grateful Dead, Black Sabbath, Free, and Jose Feliciano. Everyone is completely upstaged by the previously unknown Mungo Jerry, whose debut single "In the Summertime" becomes the best-selling hit of the year.
- 16 May – The first ever late night Prom, starting at 10pm and finishing after midnight, features jazz rock band Soft Machine at the Royal Albert Hall.
- 26–30 August – The Isle of Wight Festival 1970 takes place on East Afton Farm off the coast of England. Some 600,000 people attend the largest rock festival of all time. Artists include Jimi Hendrix, The Who, The Doors, Chicago, Richie Havens, John Sebastian, Joan Baez, Ten Years After, Emerson, Lake & Palmer and Jethro Tull.
- 17 September – Jimi Hendrix makes his last appearance, with Eric Burdon & War jamming at Ronnie Scotts Club in London. Hendrix dies the following day from a barbiturate overdose at his London hotel, aged 27.
- 2 December – first production of Michael Tippett's opera The Knot Garden staged by the Royal Opera House.
- 28 December – Carl Davis marries actress Jean Boht.

== Number ones ==
=== Singles ===
Date	Single	Artist
10 January	"Two Little Boys"	Rolf Harris
17 January	"Two Little Boys"	Rolf Harris
24 January	"Two Little Boys"	Rolf Harris
31 January	"Love Grows (Where My Rosemary Goes)"	Edison Lighthouse
7 February	"Love Grows (Where My Rosemary Goes)"	Edison Lighthouse
14 February	"Love Grows (Where My Rosemary Goes)"	Edison Lighthouse
21 February	"Love Grows (Where My Rosemary Goes)"	Edison Lighthouse
28 February	"Love Grows (Where My Rosemary Goes)"	Edison Lighthouse
7 March	"Wand'rin' Star"	Lee Marvin
14 March	"Wand'rin' Star"	Lee Marvin
21 March	"Wand'rin' Star"	Lee Marvin
28 March	"Bridge over Troubled Water"	Simon & Garfunkel
4 April	"Bridge over Troubled Water"	Simon & Garfunkel
11 April	"Bridge over Troubled Water"	Simon & Garfunkel
18 April	"All Kinds of Everything"	Dana
25 April	"All Kinds of Everything"	Dana
2 May	"Spirit in the Sky"	Norman Greenbaum
9 May	"Spirit in the Sky"	Norman Greenbaum
16 May	"Back Home"	England World Cup Squad
23 May	"Back Home"	England World Cup Squad
30 May	"Back Home"	England World Cup Squad
6 June	"Yellow River"	Christie
13 June	"In the Summertime"	Mungo Jerry
20 June	"In the Summertime"	Mungo Jerry
27 June	"In the Summertime"	Mungo Jerry
3 July	"In the Summertime"	Mungo Jerry
10 July	"In the Summertime"	Mungo Jerry
17 July	"In the Summertime"	Mungo Jerry
24 July	"In the Summertime"	Mungo Jerry
1 August	"The Wonder of You"	Elvis Presley
8 August	"The Wonder of You"	Elvis Presley
15 August	"The Wonder of You"	Elvis Presley
22 August	"The Wonder of You"	Elvis Presley
29 August	"The Wonder of You"	Elvis Presley
5 September	"The Wonder of You"	Elvis Presley
12 September	"The Tears of a Clown"	Smokey Robinson and The Miracles
19 September	"Band of Gold"	Freda Payne
26 September	"Band of Gold"	Freda Payne
3 October	"Band of Gold"	Freda Payne
10 October	"Band of Gold"	Freda Payne
17 October	"Band of Gold"	Freda Payne
24 October	"Band of Gold"	Freda Payne
31 October	"Woodstock"	Matthews' Southern Comfort
7 November	"Woodstock"	Matthews' Southern Comfort
14 November	"Woodstock"	Matthews' Southern Comfort
21 November	"Voodoo Chile"	Jimi Hendrix Experience
28 November	"I Hear You Knocking"	Dave Edmunds
5 December	"I Hear You Knocking"	Dave Edmunds
12 December	"I Hear You Knocking"	Dave Edmunds
19 December	"I Hear You Knocking"	Dave Edmunds
26 December	"I Hear You Knocking"	Dave Edmunds
2 January	"I Hear You Knocking"	Dave Edmunds

=== Albums ===
Date	Album	Artist
10 January	Abbey Road	The Beatles
17 January	Abbey Road	The Beatles
24 January	Abbey Road	The Beatles
31 January	Abbey Road	The Beatles
7 February	Led Zeppelin II	Led Zeppelin
14 February	Motown Chartbusters Vol.3	Various Artists
21 February	Bridge Over Troubled Water	Simon & Garfunkel
28 February	Bridge Over Troubled Water	Simon & Garfunkel
7 March	Bridge Over Troubled Water	Simon & Garfunkel
14 March	Bridge Over Troubled Water	Simon & Garfunkel
21 March	Bridge Over Troubled Water	Simon & Garfunkel
28 March	Bridge Over Troubled Water	Simon & Garfunkel
4 April	Bridge Over Troubled Water	Simon & Garfunkel
11 April	Bridge Over Troubled Water	Simon & Garfunkel
18 April	Bridge Over Troubled Water	Simon & Garfunkel
25 April	Bridge Over Troubled Water	Simon & Garfunkel
2 May	Bridge Over Troubled Water	Simon & Garfunkel
9 May	Bridge Over Troubled Water	Simon & Garfunkel
16 May	Bridge Over Troubled Water	Simon & Garfunkel
23 May	Let It Be	The Beatles
30 May	Let It Be	The Beatles
6 June	Let It Be	The Beatles
13 June	Bridge Over Troubled Water	Simon & Garfunkel
20 June	Bridge Over Troubled Water	Simon & Garfunkel
27 June	Bridge Over Troubled Water	Simon & Garfunkel
4 July	Bridge Over Troubled Water	Simon & Garfunkel
11 July	Self Portrait	Bob Dylan
18 July	Bridge Over Troubled Water	Simon & Garfunkel
25 July	Bridge Over Troubled Water	Simon & Garfunkel
1 August	Bridge Over Troubled Water	Simon & Garfunkel
8 August	Bridge Over Troubled Water	Simon & Garfunkel
15 August	Bridge Over Troubled Water	Simon & Garfunkel
22 August	A Question of Balance	The Moody Blues
29 August	A Question of Balance	The Moody Blues
5 September	A Question of Balance	The Moody Blues
12 September	Cosmo's Factory	Creedence Clearwater Revival
19 September	Get Yer Ya-Ya's Out	The Rolling Stones
26 September	Get Yer Ya-Ya's Out	The Rolling Stones
3 October 1970	Bridge Over Troubled Water	Simon & Garfunkel
10 October	Paranoid	Black Sabbath
17 October	Bridge Over Troubled Water	Simon & Garfunkel
24 October	Atom Heart Mother	Pink Floyd
31 October	Motown Chartbusters Vol.4	Various Artists
7 November	Led Zeppelin III	Led Zeppelin
14 November	Led Zeppelin III	Led Zeppelin
21 November	Led Zeppelin III	Led Zeppelin
28 November	New Morning	Bob Dylan
5 December	Greatest Hits	Andy Williams
12 December	Led Zeppelin III	Led Zeppelin
19 December	Greatest Hits	Andy Williams
26 December	Greatest Hits	Andy Williams
2 January	Greatest Hits	Andy Williams

== Year-end charts ==
=== Best-selling singles (covering 17 Jan to 19 December 1970) ===
1. "In the Summertime" – Mungo Jerry
2. "The Wonder of You" – Elvis Presley
3. "Band of Gold" – Freda Payne
4. "Spirit in the Sky" – Norman Greenbaum
5. "Bridge Over Troubled Water" – Simon and Garfunkel
6. "Back Home" – England World Cup Squad
7. "All Right Now" – Free
8. "Wand'rin' Star" – Lee Marvin
9. "Yellow River" – Christie
10. "The Tears of a Clown" – Smokey Robinson and The Miracles
11. "Love Grows (Where My Rosemary Goes)" – Edison Lighthouse
12. "All Kinds of Everything" – Dana
13. "Lola" – Kinks
14. "Can't Help Falling In Love" – Andy Williams
15. "Groovin' With Mr. Bloe" – Mr. Bloe
16. "Something" – Shirley Bassey
17. "Woodstock" – Matthews Southern Comfort
18. "Black Night" – Deep Purple
19. "Neanderthal Man" – Hotlegs
20. "Cottonfields" – Beach Boys
21. "Honey Come Back" – Glen Campbell
22. "Question" – The Moody Blues
23. "Knock, Knock Who's There?" – Mary Hopkin
24. "Sally" – Gerry Monroe
25. "Two Little Boys" – Rolf Harris
26. "Patches" – Clarence Carter
27. "You Can Get It If You Really Want" – Desmond Dekker
28. "It's All in the Game" – Four Tops
29. "I Hear You Knocking" – Dave Edmunds
30. "Voodoo Chile" – The Jimi Hendrix Experience
31. "Give Me Just a Little More Time" – Chairmen of the Board
32. "Me and My Life" – The Tremeloes
33. "Mama Told Me Not to Come" – Three Dog Night
34. "Goodbye Sam, Hello Samantha" – Cliff Richard
35. "I Want You Back" – The Jackson 5
36. "Up Around the Bend" – Creedence Clearwater Revival
37. "Paranoid" – Black Sabbath
38. "Let's Work Together" – Canned Heat
39. "Rainbow" – Marmalade
40. "Leaving On a Jet Plane" – Peter, Paul and Mary
41. "Montego Bay" – Bobby Bloom
42. "Indian Reservation" – Don Fardon
43. "Daughter of Darkness" – Tom Jones
44. "Everything Is Beautiful" – Ray Stevens
45. "Young, Gifted and Black" – Bob and Marcia
46. "Let It Be" – The Beatles
47. "House of the Rising Sun" – Frijid Pink
48. "I Don't Believe in If Anymore" – Roger Whittaker
49. "(They Long to Be) Close to You" – The Carpenters
50. "Which Way You Goin' Billy?" – Poppy Family

=== Best-selling albums ===
The list of the top fifty best-selling albums of 1970 were published in Record Mirror at the end of the year, and later reproduced in the first edition of the BPI Year Book in 1976. However, in 2007 the Official Charts Company published album chart histories for each year from 1956 to 1977, researched by historian Sharon Mawer, and included an updated list of the top ten best-selling albums for each year based on the new research. The updated top ten for 1970 is shown in the table below.

No.	Title	Artist	Peak position
1	Bridge over Troubled Water	Simon & Garfunkel	1
2	Led Zeppelin II	Led Zeppelin	1
3	Easy Rider	Original Soundtrack	2
4	Paint Your Wagon	Original Soundtrack	2
5	Motown Chartbusters Vol. 3	Various Artists	1
6	Let It Be	The Beatles	1
7	Abbey Road	The Beatles	1
8	Greatest Hits	Andy Williams	1
9	Deep Purple in Rock	Deep Purple	4
10	McCartney	Paul McCartney	2

== Classical works ==
- Sir Arthur Bliss – Concerto for Cello and Orchestra
- Alun Hoddinott
  - Violin Sonata 2
  - Cello Sonata 1
- Daniel Jones – String Trio
- William Mathias – Harp Concerto
- Stanley Myers – "Cavatina"
- Michael Tippett – Songs for Dov
- David Wynne – Duo for cello and piano

== Opera ==
- Benjamin Britten – Owen Wingrave

== Film and incidental music ==
- Frank Cordell – Cromwell, starring Richard Harris and Alec Guinness.
- Johnny Douglas – The Railway Children directed by Lionel Jeffries, starring Dinah Sheridan, Jenny Agutter, Sally Thomsett and Bernard Cribbins.
- Stanley Myers –
  - A Severed Head, starring Ian Holm, Claire Bloom, Lee Remick and Richard Attenborough.
  - Take a Girl Like You directed by Jonathan Miller, starring Hayley Mills and Oliver Reed.
  - The Walking Stick – includes "Cavatina" which was later made famous when used in the 1978 film The Deer Hunter.
- William Walton – Three Sisters, starring Alan Bates, Laurence Olivier and Joan Plowright.

== Musical films ==
- Let It Be (documentary about The Beatles
- Scrooge, starring Albert Finney.

== Births ==
- 14 January – Will Todd, composer and pianist
- 20 January – Mitch Benn, English comedian, singer-songwriter, and guitarist
- 31 January – Minnie Driver, actress and singer
- 1 March – Alison Stephens, mandolin player
- 27 March – Brendan Hill, drummer
- 11 April – Delroy Pearson, singer (Five Star)
- 16 April – Gabrielle, singer
- 1 May – Bernard Butler, singer and guitarist (Suede)
- 14 May – Lee Murray, singer and drummer (Let Loose)
- 19 June – MJ Hibbett, singer-songwriter
- 22 June – Alan Leach, drummer (Shed Seven)
- 6 July – Martin Smith, singer-songwriter and guitarist (Delirious?)
- 10 July – Jason Orange, singer (Take That)
- 16 July – Lee Baxter, singer (Caught in the Act)
- 17 July – Mandy Smith, singer
- 13 July – Julian Wagstaff, composer
- 11 August – Andy Bell, bassist (Oasis)
- 14 September – Mark Webber, guitarist (Pulp)
- 4 October – Andy Parle, drummer (Space)
- 13 October – Paul Potts, concert tenor
- 21 October – Tony Mortimer, singer (East 17)
- 24 October – Eds Chesters, drummer (The Bluetones)
- 7 November – Neil Hannon, Northern Irish musician (The Divine Comedy)
- 11 December – Matthew Strachan, composer and singer-songwriter
- 12 December – David Horne, composer
- 14 December – Beth Orton, singer-songwriter
- 14 December – Jonathan Cole, composer and head of composition, Royal College of Music.
- 18 December – Peshay, producer, DJ, remixer
- 29 December – Aled Jones, boy soprano, later baritone
- date unknown
  - David Bruce, composer
  - Julian Wagstaff, Scottish composer

== Deaths ==
- 26 February – Ethel Leginska, English-American pianist, music teacher, composer and conductor, 84
- 28 May – Frederick William Wadely, organist and composer, 88
- 20 July – Oda Slobodskaya, Russian-born British soprano, 81
- 29 July – Sir John Barbirolli, conductor, 70
- 1 September – Alan Styler, operatic baritone, 44
- 6 September – Louie Pounds, actress and singer, 98
- November – J. Murdoch Henderson, fiddler, composer and music critic, 68
- 17 November – Frank Lawes, banjo player and composer, 66
- 18 November – Gavin Gordon, singer, actor and composer, 68
- 31 December – Cyril Scott, composer and writer, 91
- date unknown – Frederic Bayco, organist and composer, 57

== See also ==
- 1970 in British radio
- 1970 in British television
- 1970 in the United Kingdom
- List of British films of 1970
