= Hibbitt =

Hibbitt is a surname. Notable people with the surname include:

- Kenny Hibbitt (born 1951), English footballer and manager;
- Larry Hibbitt, English songwriter and record producer;
- Terry Hibbitt (1947–1994), English footballer and manager.

== See also ==
- Hibbett
