= 1970 in the United Kingdom =

Events from the year 1970 in the United Kingdom.

== Incumbents ==
- Monarch – Elizabeth II
- Prime Minister
  - Harold Wilson (Labour) (until 19 June)
  - Edward Heath (Conservative) (starting 19 June)

== Events ==
=== January ===
- 1 January
  - The age of majority for most legal purposes is reduced from 21 to 18 under terms of the Family Law Reform Act 1969.
  - The half crown coin ceases to be legal tender.
  - The National Westminster Bank begins trading following the merger of National Provincial Bank and Westminster Bank.
  - Control of London Transport passes from the London Transport Board (reporting to the Minister of Transport) to the London Transport Executive of the Greater London Council, except for country area (green) buses which pass to London Country Bus Services, a subsidiary of the nationalised National Bus Company.
- 18 January – The grave of Marxist philosopher Karl Marx at Highgate Cemetery in London is vandalised.
- 21 January – Fraserburgh life-boat Duchess of Kent, on service to the Danish fishing vessel Opal, capsizes with the loss of five of the six crew.
- 22 January – A Pan Am Boeing 747 lands at London Heathrow Airport, the first jumbo jet to land in Britain.
- 26 January – The Rolling Stones' frontman Mick Jagger is fined £200 (equivalent to more than £2,660 in 2024) for possession of cannabis.

=== February ===
- February
  - Chrysler UK launches its new Hillman Avenger small family car, which will be built at the Ryton plant near Coventry and compete with the likes of the Ford Escort and Vauxhall Viva.
  - Richard Branson starts the Virgin Group with discounted mail-order sales of popular records.
- 13 February
  - Garden House riot, Cambridge: a demonstration at the Garden House Hotel by Cambridge University students against the Greek military junta leads to police intervention; eight students subsequently receive custodial sentences for their part in the affair.
  - Birmingham band Black Sabbath release their self-titled debut album, credited as the first major album in the heavy metal genre.
- 14 February – The Who record their Live at Leeds album at the University of Leeds Refectory (released 11 May).
- 19 February – The Prince of Wales (the future King Charles III) joins the Royal Navy.
- 23 February – Rolls-Royce ask the Government for £50,000,000 towards the development of the RB 211-50 Airbus jet engine.
- 27 February–1 March – First National Women's Liberation Conference held, at Ruskin College, Oxford.

=== March ===
- 2 March – Rhodesian Prime Minister Ian Smith declares Rhodesia a republic, breaking all ties with the British Crown four years after the declaration of independence on 11 November 1965. The UK Government refuses to recognise the new state as long as the white minority Rhodesian Government opposes majority rule.
- 6 March – The importation of pets is banned after an outbreak of rabies in Newmarket, Suffolk.
- 12 March
  - The Bridgwater by-election becomes the first election in which eighteen-year-olds are entitled to vote. The seat is retained for the Conservative Party by Tom King.
  - The quarantine period for cats and dogs is increased to one year as part of the Government's anti-rabies measures.
- 17 March – Martin Peters, who scored for England in their 1966 World Cup final win, becomes the nation's first £200,000 footballer in his transfer from West Ham United to Tottenham Hotspur.
- 23 March – Thalidomide scandal: Eighteen victims of thalidomide are awarded a total of nearly £370,000 in compensation.

=== April ===
- 1 April – Everton win the Football League First Division title.
- 10 April
  - Paul McCartney publicly announces that he has left The Beatles in a press release, written in mock-interview style, included in promotional copies of his first solo album and headlined in the Daily Mirror newspaper.
  - The Elton John album is released, the second album by Elton John, but the first to be released in the United States.
- 11 April – Chelsea and Leeds United draw 2–2 in the FA Cup final at Wembley Stadium, forcing a replay.
- 16 April – Dr. Ian Paisley enters the Parliament of Northern Ireland after winning the Bannside By-election.
- 18 April – British Leyland announces that the Morris Minor, its longest-running model which has been in production since 1948, will be discontinued at the start of next year and be replaced with a new larger car available as a four-door saloon and three-door fastback coupe, and possibly a five-door estate by 1975.
- 21 April – The moderate Alliance Party is formed in Northern Ireland, initially as a platform for liberal Unionists and pro-O'Neill voters. From the outset though, it declares as neither Unionist nor Nationalist, instead declaring as 'Other'.
- 29 April – David Webb scores the winning goal as Chelsea defeat Leeds United 2–1 in the FA Cup final replay at Old Trafford, gaining them the trophy for the very first time. Last year's winners Manchester City clinch the European Cup Winners' Cup with a 2–1 win over Górnik Zabrze of Poland in Vienna, Austria.

=== May ===
- 19 May – The Government makes a £20,000,000 loan available to help save the financially troubled luxury car and aircraft engine manufacturer Rolls-Royce.
- 22 May – A tour of England by the South African cricket team is called off after several African and Asian countries threaten to boycott the Commonwealth Games.
- 23 May – A fire occurs in the Britannia Bridge over the Menai Strait near Bangor, Caernarfonshire, Wales, causing its partial destruction and amounting to approximately £1,000,000 worth of fire damage.
- 27 May – A British expedition climbs the south face of Annapurna I.
- 28 May – Bobby Moore, captain of the England national football team, is arrested and released on bail in Bogotá, Colombia, on suspicion of stealing a bracelet in the Bogotá Bracelet incident.
- 29 May – Law Reform (Miscellaneous Provisions) Act abolishes actions for breach of promise and the right of a husband to claim damages for adultery with his wife.

=== June ===
- 1 June – Prime Minister Harold Wilson is hit in the face with an egg thrown by Richard Ware, a Young Conservative demonstrator.
- 2 June – Cleddau Bridge, in Pembrokeshire, collapses during erection, killing four, leading to introduction of new standards for box girder bridges.
- 4 June – Tonga becomes independent from the UK.
- 10 June – Just a few months after the Conservatives had enjoyed opinion poll leads of more than 20 points, the polls are showing Labour several points ahead of the Conservatives with eight days to go before the general election. If Labour were to win the election, it would be a record third consecutive win for them and would probably result in the end of Edward Heath's five-year reign as Conservative leader.
- 13 June
  - Actor Laurence Olivier is made a life peer in the Queen's Birthday Honours list. He is the first actor to be made a lord.
  - "The Long and Winding Road" becomes the Beatles' 20th and final single to reach number one on the US Billboard Hot 100 chart in the US. It is not released as a single in the UK.
- 14 June – The England national football team's defence of the FIFA World Cup ends when they lose 3–2 to West Germany at the quarter-final in Mexico.
- 17 June
  - The bodies of two children are found buried in shallow graves in woodland at Waltham Abbey, Essex. They are believed to be those of Susan Blatchford (11) and Gary Hanlon (12), who were last seen alive near their homes in North London on 31 March this year. These become known as the "Babes in the Wood murders" and remain unsolved until a confession in 1998.
  - British Leyland creates a niche in the four-wheel drive market by launching its luxury Range Rover, which is to be marketed as a more upmarket and urban alternative to the utilitarian Land Rover that has been in production since 1948.
  - David Storey's Home is premiered at the Royal Court Theatre.
- 18 June – 1970 general election: the Conservative Party wins and Edward Heath becomes Prime Minister, ousting the Labour government of Harold Wilson after nearly six years in power. The election result is something of a surprise, as most of the opinion polls had predicted a third successive Labour win. This is the first general election in which eighteen-year-olds are entitled to vote. Among the new Members of Parliament are future Labour party leaders Neil Kinnock and John Smith; and Kenneth Clarke, Kenneth Baker, Norman Fowler and Geoffrey Howe for the Conservatives.
- 21 June – British golfer Tony Jacklin wins the U.S. Open.
- 22 June – The Methodist Church allows women to become full ministers for the first time.
- 26 June – Riots break out in Derry over the arrest of Mid-Ulster MP Bernadette Devlin.
- 29 June – Caroline Thorpe, 32-year-old wife of Liberal Party leader Jeremy Thorpe and mother of their two-year-old son Rupert, dies in a car crash.

=== July ===
- 3 July – Dan-Air Flight 1903: 112 people are killed when a Manchester to Barcelona charter flight crashes in the mountains of Northern Spain due to navigation error, with no survivors.
- 3–5 July – Falls Curfew: A British Army search for weapons in the staunchly Irish nationalist district of the Falls Road, Belfast, turns into a battle with the Irish Republican Army in which four civilians are killed, at least 78 others wounded and 337 arrested, with eighteen soldiers also wounded.
- 8 July – Roy Jenkins becomes Deputy Leader of the Labour Party.
- 12 July – Jack Nicklaus wins the Open Golf Championship at St Andrews, defeating fellow American Doug Sanders in an eighteen-hole play-off.
- 14 July – 5 speedway riders die in Lokeren, Belgium when a minibus carrying members of the West Ham speedway team crashes into a petrol tanker after a brief tour. One of those killed is Phil Bishop, a founding member of the team from before World War II.
- 15 July – Dockers vote to strike, leading to the dockers' strike of 1970.
- 16 July – A state of emergency is declared to deal with the dockers' strike.
- 16–25 July – The British Commonwealth Games are held in Edinburgh.
- 17 July – Lord Pearson proposes settlement of the dockers' strike.
- 18 July - Kenny Everett makes a joke about a news item regarding the wife of the Transport Minister passing her advanced driving test during his Saturday morning Radio 1 show. Already on a last warning with BBC bosses after making a number of critical outbursts to the media about the corporation, he is sacked two days later.
- 20 July - After only one month in the post following the Conservative Party's victory in the General Election, the Chancellor of the Exchequer, Iain Macleod, dies of a heart attack at 11 Downing Street aged 56.
- 23 July
  - Two "tear gas" (CS gas) canisters are thrown into the House of Commons chamber.
  - The 1970 Omani coup d'état takes place, with covert British support.
- 30 July – The dockers' strike is settled.
- 31 July – "Black Tot Day": The last issue of a rum ration (grog) in the Royal Navy is distributed.

=== August ===
- 9 August – Police battle with rioters in Notting Hill, London.
- 20 August – England national football team captain Bobby Moore is cleared of stealing a bracelet while on World Cup duty in Colombia.
- 21 August – The moderate Social Democratic and Labour Party is established in Northern Ireland.
- 26–31 August – The Isle of Wight Festival 1970 begins on East Afton Farm. Some 600,000 people attend the largest rock festival of all time. Artists include Jimi Hendrix, The Who, The Doors, Chicago, Richie Havens, John Sebastian, Joan Baez, Ten Years After, Emerson, Lake & Palmer, The Moody Blues and Jethro Tull.
- 27 August – The Royal Shakespeare Company's revolutionary production of Shakespeare's A Midsummer Night's Dream, directed by Peter Brook, opens at Stratford.

=== September ===
- 9 September – BOAC Flight 775 is hijacked by the Popular Front for the Liberation of Palestine after taking off from Bahrain – the first time a British plane has been hijacked.
- 12 September – Nijinsky becomes the only horse after 1935 to complete the English Triple Crown by finishing first in the Epsom Derby, 2000 Guineas and St Leger, ridden by Lester Piggott.
- 18 September – American rock star Jimi Hendrix, 27, dies in London from a suspected drug-induced heart attack.
- 19 September – The first Glastonbury Festival is held, as the Worthy Farm Pop, Blues and Folk Festival. Tyrannosaurus Rex (replacing The Kinks) headline and about 1500 attend.
- September – The album musical Jesus Christ Superstar, by Andrew Lloyd Webber and Tim Rice, is released.

=== October ===
- 3 October – Tony Densham, driving the "Commuter" dragster, sets a British land speed record at Elvington, Yorkshire, averaging 207.6 mph over the flying kilometre course.
- 5 October
  - BBC Radio 4 first broadcasts consumer affairs magazine programme You and Yours; it will still be running over fifty years later.
  - In Canada, the Front de libération du Québec (FLQ) kidnaps British trade commissioner James Cross in Montreal and demands release of all imprisoned FLQ members. He is released on 3 December in exchange for free passage for his kidnappers to Cuba.
- 10 October – Fiji becomes independent from the United Kingdom.
- 12 October – After a failed launch only eighteen months previously, British Leyland announce a much improved Austin Maxi featuring a new gearchange, increased engine size and much improved trim, answering many of the critical points raised by the motoring press at the car's original launch.
- 15 October
  - The government creates the Department of Trade & Industry and the Department of the Environment.
  - Thames sailing barge Cambria, the last vessel trading under sail alone in British waters, loads her last freight, at Tilbury.
  - The last narrowboats to carry long-distance freight commercially on the canals of the United Kingdom arrive with their last load, coal from Atherstone for a West London jam factory.
- 19 October – BP discovers a large oil field in the North Sea.
- 23 October – The Mark III Ford Cortina goes on sale. At launch a full range of models is offered including two-door and estate variants. Unlike previous models, this Cortina has been developed as a Ford Europe model sharing the floor-pan with the similar German Ford Taunus.
- 25 October – Canonization of the Forty Martyrs of England and Wales by Pope Paul VI takes place.

=== November ===
- 8 November – Comedy series The Goodies is first broadcast, on BBC2.
- 17 November – The first Page Three girl appears in The Sun newspaper.
- 18 November – The first Iceland frozen food supermarket is opened, in Oswestry, by Malcolm Walker.
- 20 November
  - The ten shilling note ceases to be legal tender.
  - The Miss World 1970 beauty pageant, hosted by Bob Hope at the Royal Albert Hall, London is disrupted by Women's Liberation protesters. Earlier on the same evening a bomb is placed under a BBC outside broadcast vehicle by The Angry Brigade anarchist group in protest at the entry of separate black and white contestants by South Africa.
- 27 November – The Gay Liberation Front organises its first march in London.
- 30 November – British Caledonian Airways Ltd (BCal) is formed by the merger of Caledonian Airways and British United Airways.

=== December ===
- 10 December – Bernard Katz wins the Nobel Prize in Physiology or Medicine jointly with Ulf von Euler and Julius Axelrod "for their discoveries concerning the humoral transmitters in the nerve terminals and the mechanism for their storage, release and inactivation".
- 31 December – Paul McCartney files a lawsuit against the other members of The Beatles to dissolve their partnership, effectively ending the band.

=== Undated ===
- The last forced child migration to Australia takes place.
- The average age at first marriage is at a 20th-century low of 23.
- Trade union membership now accounts for nearly 50% of the workforce.
- Mathematician Alan Baker wins a Fields Medal.

== Publications ==
- Agatha Christie's thriller Passenger to Frankfurt.
- Roald Dahl’s children’s novel Fantastic Mr Fox.
- Len Deighton's World War II novel Bomber (the first written on a word processor).
- Lawrence Durrell's novel Nunquam, second in The Revolt of Aphrodite pair.
- J. G. Farrell's historical novel Troubles, first in the "Empire Trilogy".
- Germaine Greer's book The Female Eunuch.
- Ted Hughes' poetry collection Crow.
- Bernice Rubens' novel The Elected Member.
- Mary Wilson's Selected Poems.
- The complete New English Bible (16 March, the New Testament having been published in 1961).
- The Ecologist magazine founded by Edward Goldsmith (July).

== Births ==
=== January – March ===
- 1 January – Stephen Kinnock, politician
- 6 January – Courtney Eaton, actress
- 7 January – Andy Burnham, politician
- 8 January – Nick Miller, weather forecaster
- 19 January – Tim Foster, rower
- 20 January – Mitch Benn, comedian and songwriter
- 24 January – Maria Balshaw, art curator
- 31 January – Minnie Driver, actress
- 3 February – Warwick Davis, actor and television presenter
- 4 February – Gabrielle Anwar, actress
- 10 February – Rob Shearman, television and radio scriptwriter
- 14 February – Simon Pegg, comedian, writer and actor
- 17 February – Thomas Heatherwick, designer
- 21 February – Jay Blades, furniture restorer and television presenter
- 25 February – Ian Walker, sailboat racer
- 26 February – Mark Harper, politician
- 1 March – Tina Cullen, field hockey player
- 2 March – James Purnell, politician
- 7 March
  - Jeff Hordley, actor
  - Rachel Weisz, actress
- 9 March – Simon Monjack, screenwriter, film director (died 2010)
- 10 March – Peter Wright, darts player
- 11 March – Jane Slavin, actress and author
- 12 March – Wayne McGregor, choreographer

=== April – June ===
- 14 April – Matt Allwright, television presenter and journalist
- 19 April – Kelly Holmes, athlete
- 27 April – Kylie Travis, actress and model
- 6 May – Chris Adams, cricketer
- 15 May
  - Nicola Walker, actress
  - Ben Wallace, Secretary of State for Defence
- 17 May – Jeremy Browne, politician, Minister of State for Foreign Affairs
- 20 May – Louis Theroux, television personality and author
- 21 May – Jason Lee, field hockey player and coach
- 22 May – Naomi Campbell, model and actress
- 26 May – Alex Garland, writer and filmmaker
- 27 May – Joseph Fiennes, actor
- 5 June – John Marquez, actor and cinematographer
- 6 June – Angad Paul, businessman and film producer (died 2015)
- 7 June – Helen Baxendale, actress
- 18 June – Katie Derham, TV and radio presenter
- 19 June – MJ Hibbett, singer-songwriter
- 20 June – Russell Garcia, field hockey player
- 22 June – Christine Cook, field hockey player
- 24 June – David May, footballer
- 25 June – Lucy Benjamin, actress
- 27 June – Jo Frost, nanny and television host
- 29 June – Marcus Wareing, chef

=== July – September ===
- 2 July – Steve Morrow, footballer
- 4 July – Doddie Weir, rugby union player (died 2022)
- 5 July – Toby Whithouse, actor, screenwriter and playwright
- 6 July
  - David Readman, singer
  - Martin Smith, singer-songwriter
- 7 July – Wayne McCullough, boxer
- 10 July
  - Jason Orange, singer
  - John Simm, actor
- 11 July – Sajjad Karim, politician
- 12 July – Conrad Coates, English-Canadian actor and teacher
- 13 July – Sharon Horgan, actress and screenwriter
- 14 July – Seb Fontaine, electronic music producer & DJ
- 16 July – Matt Healy, actor
- 19 July – Nicola Sturgeon, Scottish politician
- 25 July – Julien Fountain, English cricket coach
- 29 July – Andi Peters, television presenter and producer
- 30 July – Christopher Nolan, film director
- 31 July – Ben Chaplin, actor
- 1 August – David James, footballer
- 13 August – Alan Shearer, footballer
- 27 August – Peter Ebdon, snooker player
- 3 September – Gareth Southgate, football player and manager
- 5 September – Johnny Vegas, entertainer
- 8 September – Michael Matheson, Scottish politician
- 18 September – Darren Gough, cricketer
- 21 September – Samantha Power, United States Ambassador to the United Nations
- 29 September – Emily Lloyd, actress

=== October – December ===
- 4 October
  - Jason Cousins, footballer
  - Richard Hancox, footballer
- 5 October – Tasmina Ahmed-Sheikh, SNP politician and Member of Parliament
- 8 October
  - Anne-Marie Duff, actress
  - Sadiq Khan, Mayor of London
- 10 October – Sir Matthew Pinsent, Olympic winning rower
- 11 October – Andy Marriott, footballer
- 21 October – Tony Mortimer, singer
- 29 October – Toby Smith, musician (died 2017)
- 2 November – Matthew Syed, journalist
- 7 November – Neil Hannon, chamber pop musician (The Divine Comedy)
- 12 November – Harvey Spencer Stephens, child actor
- 13 November – Verity Snook-Larby, race walker
- 22 November – Stel Pavlou, novelist and screenwriter
- 23 November – Zoe Ball, television and radio presenter
- 28 November – Richard Osman, television presenter and writer
- 6 December – Lewis MacLeod, Scottish actor and voice actor
- 7 December – Andrew Gilding, darts player
- 10 December – Susanna Reid, television presenter and journalist
- 11 December – Matthew Strachan, composer and singer-songwriter (died 2021)
- 13 December – Jesse Armstrong, screenwriter
- 17 December – Stella Tennant, model (died 2020)
- 20 December – Alister McRae, Scottish rally driver
- 21 December – Jamie Theakston, television presenter
- 29 December – Aled Jones, singer and television presenter
- 31 December – Louise Rickard, Welsh rugby union player

=== Undated ===
- Helen Cammock, artist
- Alison Phillips, newspaper editor

== Deaths ==
=== January – March ===
- 7 January – Allan Wilkie, Shakespearean actor noted for his career in Australia (born 1878)
- 13 January – Jimmy Hanley, actor (born 1918)
- 23 January – Ifan ab Owen Edwards, Welsh youth worker, founder of the Urdd (born 1895)
- 26 January
  - Albert Evans-Jones (Cynan), Welsh poet and dramatist (born 1895)
  - Sir Noel Laurence, admiral (born 1882)
- 29 January – Basil Liddell Hart, military historian (born 1895)
- 30 January – Malcolm Keen, actor (born 1887)
- 2 February – Bertrand Russell, logician and philosopher, recipient of the Nobel Prize in Literature (born 1872)
- 14 February – Bert Strudwick, cricketer (born 1880)
- 15 February – Hugh Dowding, commander of RAF Fighter Command during the Battle of Britain (born 1882)
- 26 February – Terence Patrick O'Sullivan, civil engineer (born 1913)
- 28 February – Arthur Henry Knighton-Hammond, painter (born 1875)
- 15 March – David Horne, actor (born 1898)
- 29 March – Vera Brittain, writer (born 1893)

=== April – June ===
- 20 April – Thomas Iorwerth Ellis, academic (born 1899)
- 7 May – Jack Jones, novelist (born 1884)
- 13 May – Tom Sloan, television executive (born 1919)
- 20 May – Sir John Whiteley, general (born 1896)
- 26 May – R. V. C. Bodley, army officer, traveller and writer (born 1892)
- 2 June – Bruce McLaren, racing car driver and designer, racing accident (born 1937 in New Zealand)
- 7 June – E. M. Forster, novelist (born 1879)
- 15 June
  - Robert Morrison MacIver, Scottish-born sociologist (born 1882)
  - Archibald Sinclair, former leader of the Liberal Party (born 1890)
- 27 June – Edwin La Dell, artist (born 1914)
- 30 June
  - Arthur Leslie, actor (born 1899)
  - Githa Sowerby, dramatist (born 1876)

=== July – September ===
- 7 July – Sir Allen Lane, publisher (born 1902)
- 13 July – Isobel Hogg Kerr Beattie, architect (born 1900)
- 20 July – Iain Macleod, politician (born 1913)
- 26 July – Claud Allister, actor (born 1888)
- 29 July – Sir John Barbirolli, conductor (born 1899)
- 5 September – Jesse Pennington, footballer (born 1883)
- 10 September – Violet Cressy-Marcks (Mrs Frank Fisher), explorer (born 1895)

=== October – December ===
- 8 November – Alasdair Mackenzie, Liberal MP (born 1903)
- 11 November – Charles FitzRoy, 10th Duke of Grafton, peer, politician and farmer (born 1892)
- 13 November – Bessie Braddock, Labour MP (born 1899)
- 29 November – Irfan Orga, Ottoman-born airman and author (born 1908)
- 14 December – William Slim, Field Marshal (born 1891)
- 26 December
  - Lillian Board, Olympic athlete (born 1948)
  - Henry Montgomery Campbell, former Bishop of London (born 1887)
- 31 December – Cyril Scott, composer and writer (born 1879)

== See also ==
- 1970 in British music
- 1970 in British television
- List of British films of 1970
