= 1970 in British radio =

This is a list of events in British radio during 1970.

== Events ==
=== January ===
- 23 January – Radio North Sea International begins test broadcasts.

=== February ===
- 8 February – DJ Annie Nightingale presents her first show on BBC Radio 1; she will still be broadcasting on the channel until shortly before her death in 2024.
- 11 February – "Pirate" radio station Radio North Sea International begins regular broadcasts to the UK from MV Mebo II off the Dutch coast.

=== March ===
- 24 March – RNSI's ship Mebo II anchors in international waters off Clacton.

=== April ===
- 3 April – Any Questions is broadcast on Radio 2 for the final time. Previously, BBC Radio 4 has carried only the Saturday lunchtime repeat; now both the Friday evening and Saturday lunchtime airings of the programme will be heard on Radio 4.
- 4 April
  - BBC Radio's sports coverage (other than Test cricket) transfers from BBC Radio 3 to BBC Radio 2 and the first edition of Sport on 2 is broadcast. The former Third Programme and Music Programme elements of Radio 3 are fully integrated under its banner.
  - BBC Radio 4 begins broadcasting satirical radio current affairs sketch show Week Ending, which becomes a "training ground" for comedy writers and producers.
- 5 April – Your Hundred Best Tunes moves from BBC Radio 4 to BBC Radio 2.
- 6 April – On BBC Radio 4, programmes which will still be running more than 50 years later are introduced:
  - The first edition of PM, the early evening news and current affairs programme, airs.
  - The first Thought for the Day is broadcast, replacing ‘’Ten to Eight’’.
  - The first edition of Start the Week is broadcast, with Richard Baker as presenter.
- 10 April – First broadcast of Radio 4's current affairs programme Analysis, another programme which will still be running more than 50 years later.
- 15 April – The UK government begins jamming Radio North Sea International.

=== May ===
- No events

=== June ===
- 13–20 June – Radio North Sea International rebrands as Radio Caroline International during the general election campaign, during which it supports the victorious Conservative Party which it considers to be supportive of commercial broadcasting.

=== July ===
- July – Kenny Everett is dismissed by BBC Radio 1 after making cheeky remarks about the Transport Minister's wife following a news item.
- 23 July – Radio North Sea International's Mebo II returns to broadcasting from off the Dutch coast.

=== August ===
- No events.

=== September ===
- 1 September – United Biscuits launches its own radio station United Biscuits Network which is broadcast round the clock to the company's four factories.
- 6 September – BBC Radio 4 begins broadcasting the Sunday morning religious magazine programme, which will still be running more than 50 years later.

=== October ===
- 5 October – The daily consumer affairs programme You and Yours debuts on Radio 4; it will still be running more than 50 years later.
- 9 October – Round Table, a weekly programme discussions the week's new releases, is broadcast for the first time on Radio 1. Emperor Rosko is the programme's host.
- October – The In Concert brand begins to be used on BBC Radio 1.

=== November ===
- No events.

=== December ===
- No events.

== Station debuts ==
- 2 January – BBC Radio Newcastle
- 1 September – United Biscuits Network (1970–1979)
- 4 September – BBC Radio Bristol
- 10 September – BBC Radio Manchester
- 6 October – BBC Radio London (1970–1988)
- 29 October – BBC Radio Oxford
- 9 November – BBC Radio Birmingham
- 18 December – BBC Radio Medway
- 31 December – BBC Radio Solent, Radio Teesside

== Programme debuts ==
- 4 April – Week Ending on BBC Radio 4 (1970–1998)
- 6 April – Start the Week on BBC Radio 4 (1970–Present)
- 6 April – PM on BBC Radio 4 (1970–Present)
- 6 September – Sunday on BBC Radio 4 (1970–Present)
- 5 October – You and Yours on BBC Radio 4 (1970–Present)

== Continuing radio programmes ==
=== 1940s ===
- Sunday Half Hour (1940–2018)
- Desert Island Discs (1942–Present)
- Down Your Way (1946–1992)
- Letter from America (1946–2004)
- Woman's Hour (1946–Present)
- A Book at Bedtime (1949–Present)

=== 1950s ===
- The Archers (1950–Present)
- The Today Programme (1957–Present)
- The Navy Lark (1959–1977)
- Sing Something Simple (1959–2001)
- Your Hundred Best Tunes (1959–2007)

=== 1960s ===
- Farming Today (1960–Present)
- In Touch (1961–Present)
- The Men from the Ministry (1962–1977)
- I'm Sorry, I'll Read That Again (1964–1973)
- Petticoat Line (1965–1979)
- The World at One (1965–Present)
- The Official Chart (1967–Present)
- Just a Minute (1967–Present)
- The Living World (1968–Present)
- The Organist Entertains (1969–2018)

== Births ==
- 2 January – Bam Bam (Peter Jarrod Poulton), radio presenter
- 14 February – Simon Pegg, comedian, film and television actor and writer, radio personality
- 15 February – Jonny Dymond, journalist and presenter
- 15 May – Justin Moorhouse, comedian and DJ
- 28 May – Paul Sinha, comedian, quizzer and radio presenter
- 18 June – Katie Derham, radio presenter
- 23 November – Zoe Ball, television and radio presenter
- 25 November – Emma B, radio presenter
- 2 December – Jo Russell, radio presenter
- Verity Sharp, music presenter

== See also ==
- 1970 in British music
- 1970 in British television
- 1970 in the United Kingdom
- List of British films of 1970
