= On the Buses series 3 =

On the Buses
- Series 3
- DVD cover
- No. of episodes: 13

Release
- Original network: ITV
- Original release: 2 January – 27 March 1970

Series chronology
- ← Previous; Series 2 Next → Series 4

The third series of On the Buses originally aired between 2 January 1970 and 27 March 1970, beginning with "First Aid". The series was produced and directed by Stuart Allen for the first ten episodes. The last three episodes were directed by Howard Ross and produced by Stuart Allen. The designer for the series was Andrew Gardner. All the episodes in this series were written by Ronald Chesney and Ronald Wolfe.

It was the first series to be broadcast in colour.

== Cast ==
- Reg Varney as Stan Butler
- Bob Grant as Jack Harper
- Anna Karen as Olive Rudge
- Doris Hare as Mabel "Mum" Butler
- Stephen Lewis as Inspector Cyril "Blakey" Blake
- Michael Robbins as Arthur Rudge

== Episodes ==
No. overall	No. in series	Title	Directed by	Written by	Original release date
14	1	"First Aid"	Stuart Allen	Ronald Chesney & Ronald Wolfe	2 January 1970
Inspector Blake injures his leg when he slips getting off Stan's bus. Their attempts to help him worsen the situation and their first aid box does not help them. A clippie at the depot helps Inspector Blake by giving his leg a massage. Because of the incident, the management decide to hold a first aid test, with those failing it taking up other positions within the company, such as cleaning and maintenance. Stan and Jack are chosen as the first candidates for the test. Arthur helps Stan with learning the first aid information, but Olive interrupts them, trying to coerce Arthur to come to bed as she has had a "glamour bath"; Stan remarks "You didn't stay in long enough". Stan and Jack pass the test, but they are unwilling to help with the delivery of a baby on their bus on a country lane.
15	2	"The Cistern"	Stuart Allen	Ronald Chesney & Ronald Wolfe	9 January 1970
The toilet in the Butler household is exceedingly old, having been fitted by Stan's grandfather, and now it will not work properly and keeps making funny noises. Stan's efforts to mend it come to grief as he stands on the toilet bowl in order to reach into the tank and the bowl shatters under his weight. The family temporarily have to use Jack's toilet, but soon buy a new one. Unfortunately, they have to carry the new toilet home on the bus and have an encounter with Blakey en route, but manage to get the new toilet home and Stan fits it successfully, only to discover it is too big, and they have to exchange it for a toilet the same model as the old one.
16	3	"The Inspector's Niece"	Stuart Allen	Ronald Chesney & Ronald Wolfe	16 January 1970
A new batch of young girls training to be clippies arrives, with Sally being the girl who turns all the men's heads. Jack and Stan fall for her and both seriously compete with each other for her attentions. Unfortunately, as Stan will soon find out, she has an all too familiar uncle - Blakey. Sally does not like scruffy men, so Stan goes home during his lunch break to shave, wash and have his uniform ironed. Jack wears his floral shirt and matching tie. Sally is attracted to Jack's dress sense. While Jack buys flowers for Sally during his shift as a conductor, Stan drives the bus away, forcing him to run after the bus all the way to the cemetery gates.
17	4	"Brew it Yourself"	Stuart Allen	Ronald Chesney & Ronald Wolfe	23 January 1970
Stan decides to make beer at home as a way of cutting expenses. However, the beer turns out stronger than usual and Stan makes the mistake of drinking it before his shift. He arrives drunk at the depot and tries to force himself on a clippie, which attracts Blakey's attention. Blakey orders Stan to take a breathalyser test, informing him he will be sacked if the test finds him drunk. Jack makes Stan eat mashed potatoes to try and remove the beer from his breath. As a final effort, he makes Stan inhale smoke to sabotage the test. Stan manages to fool the breathalyser and keeps his job.
18	5	"Busmen's Perks"	Stuart Allen	Ronald Chesney & Ronald Wolfe	30 January 1970
Stan smuggles paint out of the depot to redecorate Olive and Arthur's bedroom, which Arthur called "unfit for human habitation". He is able to smuggle some paint home, which happens to be green and yellow, the bus colours. A series of mistakes take place during the process: Arthur accidentally forgets to put the hardener in the paint so it takes a very long time to dry, and Olive touches the wall with paint on her hands when going to the toilet in the night.
19	6	"The Snake"	Stuart Allen	Ronald Chesney & Ronald Wolfe	6 February 1970
Stan, Jack and Inspector Blake attend an Indian social event at the depot, which includes Fatima, who works in the canteen, performing a dance with a snake. After the dance, Jack manages to organise a date with Fatima but she insists on taking her snake with her. Jack puts the snake in his laundry bag and tells Stan to take it home to look after, without telling him that the snake is there. When Stan gets home with the bag, the snake manages to slither out and go upstairs. At first, Olive is the only one who sees it and no one believes her when she tries to tell them. But when she thinks she sees it again in the loo and Stan, Arthur and Mum try to show her she is imagining things, they all see the snake as well and take refuge in the bathroom, where Stan calls for help out the window. Jack and Fatima arrive to the commotion and Fatima takes the snake away, but not before the family end up stuck in the bathroom and have to call for help out of the window again as Jack, fearful of Stan's reaction to being tricked, refuses to let them out.
20	7	"Mum's Last Fling"	Stuart Allen	Ronald Chesney & Ronald Wolfe	13 February 1970
Chaos ensues when Mum spends all her time with her boyfriend Wilfred, whom she met at the social club, and also works as a conductor at the depot. All the housekeeping money is going towards him and bills are going unpaid. He buys her clothes that would suit a younger woman, like a wig and thigh length boots. She neglects her household chores, meaning that Stan, Olive - a terrible cook as ever - and Arthur have to do them all. Fortunately for them, however, they discover that Wilfred is already married.
21	8	"Radio Control"	Stuart Allen	Ronald Chesney & Ronald Wolfe	20 February 1970
The bus company deal with late buses by having a two-way radio system fitted on every bus. Stan and Jack's bus is the first to be fitted with the radio, and Stan has to learn a phonetic alphabet. Inspector Blake catches the bus en route and tells Stan to go on diversion, which results in the bus getting stuck under a low bridge. The premise behind this episode was reused in the second feature film, Mutiny on the Buses (1972).
22	9	"Foggy Night"	Stuart Allen	Ronald Chesney & Ronald Wolfe	27 February 1970
Mum, Olive and Arthur visit Aunt Maud and take Stan's bus to get there. On the way back Inspector Blake joins them and a fog develops. Stan is forced to stop driving because of the thickening fog. Olive gets caught short and accidentally attracts a cow onto the bus, whilst Blakey gets ditch water in his boots before the fog clears.
23	10	"The New Uniforms"	Stuart Allen	Ronald Chesney & Ronald Wolfe	6 March 1970
Stan and Jack are chosen to trial the new bus driver and conductor uniforms, respectively, because they are the scruffiest busmen in the depot. They show off their uniforms to the other busmen in the canteen. Whilst they are eating in the canteen, Inspector Blake does his best to keep the uniforms clean. Stan and Jack get annoyed by this and eat their lunch in a nearby restaurant instead, where they meet two Swedish women who think they are pilots because their uniforms resemble pilot outfits. Because of this mix-up, Stan and Jack are happy with their uniforms but the management have decided to revert to the original uniforms because the other busmen refused to wear them. The two women arrive just as Stan and Jack are forced by Blakey to change back into their original uniforms, and are disgusted when they discover their mistake.
24	11	"Going Steady"	Howard Ross	Ronald Chesney & Ronald Wolfe	13 March 1970
Stan is dating Sally, Inspector Blake's niece, and has made adjustments to his lifestyle to impress her, such as giving up smoking. Stan tells Inspector Blake about his plan to marry Sally. He invites Sally and Inspector Blake to tea to change his opinion. Jack has been transferred to another route so Sally can be Stan's conductor. The evening devolves into arguments after Sally continually attempts to make Stan speak more poshly, mocks his appearance and insults Mum's baking, and in the end Sally and Stan break up.
25	12	"The Squeeze"	Howard Ross	Ronald Chesney & Ronald Wolfe	20 March 1970
Mum needs more housekeeping money but Stan and Arthur cannot give any more than they are already giving. Stan suggests that Arthur should sell his motorcycle and sidecar. They create an advert and Stan places it on the bus depot noticeboard. Stan and Jack make Inspector Blake interested in the combination, and give him a test ride in it. After an accident with the combination, Inspector Blake refuses to buy it.
26	13	"On the Make"	Howard Ross	Ronald Chesney & Ronald Wolfe	27 March 1970
Edna, one of the clippies at the bus depot, moves into Stan's room with her large dog, Coco. Stan sleeps in the front room, but he tries to find a way of bringing Edna downstairs in the night without the rest of the family knowing. Arthur knows of his plan and does his best to block him, so Stan barks like a dog to bring Edna downstairs. However she assumes Coco is pining for her and takes the dog into her room. Ultimately Stan ends up dog sitting whilst Edna goes out on a date with Jack.

== See also ==
- 1970 in British television
