= Nils Blythe =

British journalist

- Born: Nils Blythe; 25 February 1956 (age 70)
- Occupations: Journalist, Radio and TV presenter
- Employer: Bank of England
- Known for: BBC Business Journalist BBC News

Nils Blythe (born 25 February 1956) is a British journalist who worked for BBC News until 2011. He specialises in business and economics. Before launching his own PR company in 2014, he was the executive director of Communications at the Bank of England.

== Career ==
Blythe worked as an editor for publishers Hodder & Stoughton and then as a researcher/writer for the Consumers' Association. He joined the Investors Chronicle as a reporter in 1987 and moved to the Financial Unit of BBC News in 1988. From 1990 to 1994 he was the Business Correspondent of the Today Programme on BBC Radio 4, covering stories including Black Wednesday, the Bank of Credit and Commerce International (BCCI) scandal and the death of Robert Maxwell.

In 1994 he moved to The Money Programme on BBC television, reporting on business and economic developments around the world. His films included reports on the economic impact of AIDS in Africa, the aftermath of war in Kosovo, the business of mapping the human genome and an investigation into the role of investment banks in creating the internet share bubble. In 2001 he was the launch presenter of Business Today, a nightly programme about business and economics on the BBC News Channel. Edward George, then Governor of the Bank of England, was one of the first programme guests.

In 2004, he returned to radio as a business correspondent and played a leading role in the BBC coverage of the 2008 financial crisis.

In 2005, he accompanied then UK Chancellor Gordon Brown on a visit to China, and also reported from Mumbai on the problems of global population increase. He presented a daily account of developments in the UK's credit crunch on PM with Eddie Mair, entitled Upshares Downshares, a pun on the name of the television drama series Upstairs Downstairs. Listeners sent in musical variations on the original theme music for Upstairs Downstairs by Sandy Faris, which were used to introduce each programme and were eventually collected on a CD sold in aid of BBC Children in Need.

On 17 February 2011, Blythe announced that he would be leaving the BBC to become executive director of Communications at the Bank of England, replacing fellow ex-BBC journalist Jenny Scott. In a tongue-in-cheek homage to Nils Blythe the PM programme took to editing together and broadcasting all he said at each Bank of England Quarterly Inflation Report press conference. A podcast of each of these press conferences, which are introduced by Blythe, is available from the Bank of England website.
