= Hibbett =

Hibbett is a surname. Notable people with the surname include:

- David Hibbett, associate professor in biology at Clark University
- Howard Hibbett (1920–2019), translator and professor emeritus of Japanese literature at Harvard University
- MJ Hibbett (born 1970), English guitarist singer-songwriter

== See also ==
- Hibbett Sports, publicly traded holding company for Hibbett Sporting Goods, sporting goods retailer
