= 1970 in British television =

This is a list of British television related events from 1970.

== Events ==
=== January ===
- 1 January – 5 February – BBC2 airs The Six Wives of Henry VIII, a series of six teleplays, each of which focusses on the life of one of King Henry VIII of England's six wives.
- 3 January – Jon Pertwee makes his first appearance as the Third Doctor in the Doctor Who serial Spearhead from Space. It also marks the first time that the series is in colour.
- 4 January – BBC2 first airs Morning Story, starring Lee Montague.
- 5 January – A Question of Sport first airs on BBC1. The programme continues past its 50th anniversary until 2023.
- c. January – An Open University/BBC team replace BBC News & Current Affairs at its Alexandra Palace studios in London.

=== February ===
- 9 February – The science fiction drama series Doomwatch makes its debut on BBC1, starring John Paul, Simon Oates and Robert Powell.
- 15 February – BBC1 airs the Ken Russell film Dance of the Seven Veils as part of its Omnibus strand. The film, about German composer Richard Strauss, attracts complaints because of its sex scenes and controversy by depicting Strauss as a Nazi sympathiser. Strauss's family subsequently withdraw their permission for the use of his music, meaning the film cannot be shown again until the copyright on his work has expired. It is not until 2020 that the film is given a second airing, at that year's Keswick Film Festival.
- 20 February – The American children's show The Banana Splits first airs on BBC1, 2 months after NBC cancelled it.

=== March ===
- 7 March – The American children's show H.R. Pufnstuf first airs on selected ITV regions.
- 30 March – The first episode of the sitcom Up Pompeii, starring Frankie Howerd, airs on BBC1.

=== April ===
- 6 April – HTV starts broadcasting in colour from the Wenvoe transmitting station and from this day, the station becomes known on air as HTV rather than Harlech Television.
- 18 April – The Home International football match between Northern Ireland and Scotland at Windsor Park is the first match featuring either nation to be televised in colour, covered by ITV cameras for all broadcasters. Wales also receive their first colour coverage, from BBC cameras, as they host England at Ninian Park.
- 20 April – The children's literacy programme Words and Pictures debuts on BBC1.

=== May ===
- 31 May – 21 June – ITV introduces a studio panel, joining presenters Brian Moore and Jimmy Hill to analyse the latest action in the 1970 World Cup. This is the first time a studio panel of pundits has been used as part of UK sporting coverage.

=== June ===
- 18 June – General election results are shown on BBC1 and ITN in colour for the first time.

=== July ===
- 8 July – Jack Walker dies off-screen of a heart attack in Coronation Street as a result of the death of actor Arthur Leslie. Jack becomes the first major character to be written out due to the death of an actor.
- 16–25 July – The BBC covers the 1970 Commonwealth Games with the afternoon events broadcast live, resulting in approximately three hours a day of live coverage each day plus a highlights programme broadcast at 8pm during the week.
- 17 July – Tyne Tees Television starts broadcasting in colour from the Pontop Pike transmitting station.

=== August ===
- 3 August – The UK's final 405-lines television transmitter is switched on at Newhaven, East Sussex. All future transmitters are at the higher definition 625-lines.
- 6 August – A BBC2 broadcast of Christopher Marlowe's 16th century drama Edward II features the first same-sex kiss on British television, between Ian McKellen (as Edward) and James Laurenson (as Piers Gaveston, Edward's favourite).
- 19 August – ITV airs what is billed as the 1000th episode of Coronation Street. A souvenir edition of TVTimes is also published for the episode, even though it is, in fact, the 999th.
- August – Yorkshire and Tyne Tees Television announce plans to merge when the two are brought under the control of Trident Television Limited, a company formed to deal with the problem of effective ownership of the Bilsdale UHF transmitter and the allocation of airtime.

=== September ===
- 14 September
  - Ulster Television launches a colour service, but only from the Divis transmitting station. To mark the change, the logo is redesigned.
  - The first colour edition of Blue Peter airs on BBC1, but the last black and white edition will be transmitted on 24 June 1974. The programme alternates between colour and black and white depending on studio allocation.
  - The Nine O'Clock News is first broadcast on BBC1. The programme airs until 13 October 2000 when the station's main evening bulletin is switched to 10pm.
- 16 September – Gerry Anderson's live action science fiction series UFO airs on ITV.
- 17 September – The Hanna-Barbera cartoon show Scooby-Doo, Where Are You? makes its first British television appearance on BBC1.
- 18 September – London Weekend Television launches its river ident.
- 19 September – The American cartoon series The Pink Panther Show makes its debut on BBC1.

=== October ===
- 1 October — Anglia Television starts broadcasting in colour from the Tacolneston transmitting station.
- 15 October – BBC1 launches the Play for Today which showcases one-off dramas by a diverse variety of writers and directors.

=== November ===
- 6 November – ITV begins showing the original 1930s Universal Classic Monsters films, starting with the 1931 Dracula, starring Bela Lugosi.
- 7 November – Felix Dennis becomes the first person to use the word "cunt" on British television during a live broadcast of The Frost Programme.
- 8 November – BBC2 shows the first episode of the long running comedy sketch show The Goodies starring Tim Brooke-Taylor, Graeme Garden and Bill Oddie.
- 13 November – The Colour Strike begins when ITV staff refuse to work with colour television equipment following a dispute over pay with their management.
- 18 November – The first episode of the long-running children's movie themed quiz show Screen Test is broadcast on BBC1.
- 20 November – A bomb is placed under a BBC outside broadcast vehicle stationed to cover the Miss World 1970 beauty pageant at the Royal Albert Hall, London, by The Angry Brigade anarchist group in protest at South Africa's entry of separate black and white contestants.
- 23 November – The first edition of Engineering Announcements is broadcast on ITV.

=== December ===
- 9 December – 10th anniversary of the first episode of Coronation Street.
- 10 December – BBC1 shows the folk horror drama Robin Redbreast, as part of the Play for Today series; however, a power outage blacks out the ending of the broadcast in many areas, resulting in the BBC reshowing the drama on 25 February 1971.
- 17 December – British television premiere of the 1963 film Summer Holiday starring Cliff Richard shown on BBC1.
- 25 December – Pluto's Christmas Tree is broadcast on BBC1, the first complete Mickey Mouse cartoon to be shown on British television in colour.
- 28 December
  - ITV shows a Charlie Brown cartoon for the first time in Britain, with A Charlie Brown Christmas.
  - BBC1 screens the network television premiere of the 1964 Beatles musical comedy film, A Hard Day's Night.

=== Undated ===
- Summer – Public information films promoting the wearing of seat belts with the slogan "Clunk Click Every Trip" begin, initially presented by Shaw Taylor.
- The Hannington transmitting station in north Hampshire is built.

== Debuts ==
=== BBC1 ===
- 3 January – It's Cliff Richard! (1970–1974)
- 4 January – Ivanhoe (1970)
- 5 January – A Question of Sport (1968, 1970–2023)
- 2 February – A Stranger on the Hills (1970)
- 3 February – On Trial (1970)
- 9 February – Doomwatch (1970–1972)
- 20 February – The Banana Splits (1968–1970)
- 30 March – Up Pompeii (1970)
- 6 April – The Adventures of Parsley (1970–1971)
- 20 April – Words and Pictures (1970–2001, 2006–2007)
- 24 April – The Culture Vultures (1970)
- 29 May – Tarbuck's Luck (1970–1972)
- 2 July – The Great Inimitable Mr. Dickens (1970)
- 20 August – Hope and Keen's Crazy House (1970–1972)
- 13 September – The Black Tulip (1970)
- 14 September
  - Nine O'Clock News (1970–2000)
  - Ryan International
- 17 September
  - Bachelor Father (1970–1971)
  - Scooby-Doo, Where Are You? (1969–1970)
- 19 September
  - Ben Travers' Farces (1970)
  - The Pink Panther Show (1969–1980)
- 15 October – Play for Today (1970–1984)
- 24 October – If It's Saturday, It Must Be Nimmo (1970)
- 25 October – Little Women (1970)
- 27 October – Dastardly and Muttley in Their Flying Machines (1969–1970)
- 18 November – Screen Test (1970–1984)
- 23 November – Drama Playhouse (1970; 1972)

=== BBC2 ===
- 1 January – The Six Wives of Henry VIII (1970)
- 5 January – Barry Humphries' Scandals (1970)
- 19 January – Germinal (1970)
- 15 February – The Woodlanders (1970)
- 15 March – Daniel Deronda (1970)
- 22 March – Charley's Grants (1970)
- 7 April – Codename (1970)
- 26 April – The Spoils of Poynton (1970)
- 31 May – Villette (1970)
- 6 August – Edward II (1970)
- 9 August – Sentimental Education (1970)
- 22 September – The Roads to Freedom (1970)
- 27 September – Oh in Colour (1970)
- 29 September – Menace (1970–1973)
- 8 November – The Goodies (1970–1982)
- 4 December – Waugh on Crime (1970–1971)

=== ITV ===
- 2 January
  - Aquarius (1970–1977)
  - Manhunt (1970)
- 3 January – The Val Doonican Show (1970–1975)
- 6 January – Kate (1970–1972)
- 7 January – Redgauntlet (1970)
- 14 February – Wicked Women (1970)
- 15 February – Catweazle (1970–1971)
- 17 February – The Tribe That Hides From Man (1970)
- 3 March – The Misfit (1970–1971)
- 4 March – Smith (1970)
- 9 March – David Nixon's Magic Box (1970–1971)
- 16 March – Crime of Passion (1970–1973)
- 1 April – Shine a Light (1970)
- 2 April – Norman (1970)
- 14 April – A Family at War (1970–1972)
- 20 April – For the Love of Ada (1970–1971)
- 13 June – Albert and Victoria (1970–1971)
- 17 June – Shadows of Fear (1970–1971)
- 23 June – His and Hers (1970–1972)
- 3 July – Confession (1970)
- 6 July – Two D's and a Dog (1970)
- 10 July – The Kenny Everett Explosion (1970)
- 11 July – The Sky's the Limit (1970–1974)
- 29 July
  - Ace of Wands (1970–1972)
  - Husbands and Lovers (1970)
- 3 August – Bright's Boffins (1970–1972)
- 4 August – Never Say Die (1970)
- 28 August – If It Moves, File It (1970)
- 30 August – Big Brother (1970)
- 15 September – Skippy the Bush Kangaroo (1968–1970)
- 16 September – UFO (1970–1971)
- 18 September
  - Conceptions of Murder (1970)
  - From a Bird's Eye View (1970–1971)
  - Diamond Crack Diamond (1970)
- 24 September – On the House (1970–1971)
- 28 September – Timeslip (1970–1971)
- 9 October – The Mating Machine (1970)
- 27 October – The Lovers (1970–1971)
- 28 October
  - The Adventures of Rupert Bear (1970–1977)
  - Wreckers at Dead Eye (1970)
- 30 October
  - Tales of Unease (1970)
  - The Adventures of Don Quick (1970)
- 31 October – Ev (1970–1971)
- 4 November – Macbeth (1970)
- 5 November – Queenie's Castle (1970–1972)
- 24 November – Grady (1970)
- 14 December – Man at the Top (1970–1972)

== Television shows ==
=== Returning this year after a break of one year or longer ===
- Andy Pandy (1950, 1970, 2002–2005)
- Steptoe and Son (1962–1965, 1970–1974)

== Continuing television shows ==
=== 1920s ===
- BBC Wimbledon (1927–1939, 1946–2019, 2021–present)

=== 1930s ===
- Trooping the Colour (1937–1939, 1946–2019, 2023–present)
- The Boat Race (1938–1939, 1946–2019, 2021–present)
- BBC Cricket (1939, 1946–1999, 2020–present)

=== 1950s ===
- Come Dancing (1950–1998)
- Watch with Mother (1952–1975)
- The Good Old Days (1953–1983)
- Panorama (1953–present)
- Dixon of Dock Green (1955–1976)
- Opportunity Knocks (1956–1978, 1987–1990)
- This Week (1956–1978, 1986–1992)
- Armchair Theatre (1956–1974)
- What the Papers Say (1956–2008)
- The Sky at Night (1957–present)
- Blue Peter (1958–present)
- Grandstand (1958–2007)

=== 1960s ===
- Coronation Street (1960–present)
- Songs of Praise (1961–present)
- Z-Cars (1962–1978)
- Animal Magic (1962–1983)
- Doctor Who (1963–1989, 1996, 2005–present)
- World in Action (1963–1998)
- Top of the Pops (1964–2006)
- Match of the Day (1964–present)
- Crossroads (1964–1988, 2001–2003)
- Play School (1964–1988)
- Mr. and Mrs. (1965–1999)
- World of Sport (1965–1985)
- All Gas and Gaiters (1966–1971)
- Jackanory (1965–1996, 2006)
- Sportsnight (1965–1997)
- It's a Knockout (1966–1982, 1999–2001)
- The Money Programme (1966–2010)
- Never Mind the Quality, Feel the Width (1967–1971)
- Callan (1967–1972)
- The Golden Shot (1967–1975)
- Playhouse (1967–1982)
- Reksio (1967–1990)
- Me Mammy (1968–1971)
- Please Sir! (1968–1972)
- Father, Dear Father (1968–1973)
- Dad's Army (1968–1977)
- Magpie (1968–1980)
- The Big Match (1968–2002)
- On the Buses (1969–1973)
- Clangers (1969–1974, 2015–present)
- Monty Python's Flying Circus (1969–1974)
- Nationwide (1969–1983)
- Screen Test (1969–1984)

== Ending this year ==
- Andy Pandy (1950–1970, 2002–2005)
- Crackerjack (1955–1970, 1972–1984, 2020–2021)
- The Wednesday Play (1964–1970)
- Not Only... But Also (1965–1970)
- Mystery and Imagination (1966–1970)
- Not in Front of the Children (1967–1970)
- Never a Cross Word (1968–1970)
- Randall and Hopkirk (Deceased) (1969–1970)
- Scooby Doo, Where Are You! (1969–1970)
- Department S (TV series) (1969–1970)

== Births ==
- 8 February – Glenn Hugill, actor, presenter and producer
- 10 February – Robert Shearman, broadcast scriptwriter
- 14 February – Simon Pegg, comedian, writer and actor
- 7 March
  - Emma Davies, actress
  - Rachel Weisz, British actress
- 29 March – Ruth England, presenter and actress
- 3 April – Lucy Alexander, presenter
- 5 April – Krishnan Guru-Murthy, journalist and presenter
- 9 April – Tricia Penrose, actress and singer
- 10 May – Sally Phillips, Hong Kong-born English comedy actress
- 15 May – Nicola Walker, actress
- 20 May – Louis Theroux, presenter and author
- 22 May – Naomi Campbell, model (The Face)
- 18 June – Katie Derham, newsreader and television presenter
- 25 June – Lucy Benjamin, actress
- 7 July – Zoë Tyler, singer and actress
- 10 July – John Simm, actor
- 13 July – Sharon Horgan, English-born Irish comedy writer-performer
- 29 July – Andi Peters, presenter and producer
- 4 August – Kate Silverton, journalist, newsreader and television presenter
- 7 August – Melanie Sykes, presenter
- 5 September – Johnny Vegas, actor and comedian
- 6 September – Emily Maitlis, journalist and newsreader
- 13 September – Louise Lombard, actress
- 28 September – Jo Wyatt, actress, voice actress and singer
- 29 September – Emily Lloyd, actress
- 31 October – Craig Kelly, actor
- 12 November – Harvey Spencer Stephens, child actor
- 22 November – Stel Pavlou, novelist and screenwriter
- 23 November – Zoe Ball, television and radio presenter
- 28 November
  - Lucy Owen, Welsh television newsreader
  - Richard Osman, television presenter
- 10 December – Susanna Reid, journalist and television presenter
- 13 December – Jesse Armstrong, screenwriter
- 21 December – Jamie Theakston, broadcast presenter and producer
- 29 December – Aled Jones, singer and presenter
- Unknown – Jenny Scott, journalist and economist

== Deaths ==
- 27 April – Philip Harben, chef (Cookery), aged 63
- 13 May – Tom Sloan, television executive, aged 50
- 30 June – Arthur Leslie, actor (Coronation Street), aged 70

== See also ==
- 1970 in British music
- 1970 in British radio
- 1970 in the United Kingdom
- List of British films of 1970
