= List of British films of 1970 =

A list of films produced in the United Kingdom in 1970 (see 1970 in film):

== 1970 ==
=== Feature films ===
Title	Director	Cast	Genre	Notes
1970
The Adventures of Gerard	Jerzy Skolimowski	Peter McEnery, Claudia Cardinale, Eli Wallach	Action comedy	
And Soon the Darkness	Robert Fuest	Pamela Franklin, Michele Dotrice, Sandor Elès	Thriller	
Bartleby	Anthony Friedman	Paul Scofield, John McEnery, Thorley Walters	Drama	
The Beast in the Cellar	James Kelley	Beryl Reid, Flora Robson, John Hamill	Horror	
The Breaking of Bumbo	Andrew Sinclair	Richard Warwick, Joanna Lumley, Natasha Pyne	Comedy	
The Buttercup Chain	Robert Ellis Miller	Hywel Bennett, Jane Asher, Leigh Taylor-Young	Drama	Entered into the 1970 Cannes Film Festival
Carry On Loving	Gerald Thomas	Kenneth Williams, Sid James, Joan Sims	Comedy	
Carry On Up the Jungle	Gerald Thomas	Frankie Howerd, Sid James, Joan Sims	Comedy	
Clegg	Lindsay Shonteff	Gilbert Wynne, Gary Hope	Crime	
Connecting Rooms	Franklin Gollings	Bette Davis, Michael Redgrave, Alexis Kanner	Drama	
Cool It Carol!	Pete Walker	Robin Askwith, Janet Lynn	Sex comedy/drama	
Country Dance	J. Lee Thompson	Peter O'Toole, Susannah York, Michael Craig	Drama	
Crescendo	Alan Gibson	Stefanie Powers, James Olson, Margaretta Scott	Horror	
Cromwell	Ken Hughes	Richard Harris, Alec Guinness, Timothy Dalton	Historical	Entered into the 7th Moscow International Film Festival
Cry of the Banshee	Gordon Hessler	Vincent Price, Elisabeth Bergner, Patrick Mower	Horror	
A Day at the Beach	Simon Hesera	Mark Burns, Beatie Edney	Drama	
Deep End	Jerzy Skolimowski	Jane Asher, John Moulder Brown, Diana Dors	Drama	Co-production with West Germany
Doctor in Trouble	Ralph Thomas	Leslie Phillips, Robert Morley, Harry Secombe	Comedy	
Dorian Gray	Massimo Dallamano	Helmut Berger, Richard Todd, Herbert Lom	Thriller	Co-production with Germany and Italy
Entertaining Mr Sloane	Douglas Hickox	Beryl Reid, Harry Andrews, Peter McEnery	Black comedy	
Every Home Should Have One	Jim Clark	Marty Feldman, Judy Cornwell, Julie Ege	Comedy	
The Executioner	Sam Wanamaker	George Peppard, Joan Collins, Judy Geeson	Spy	
Eyewitness	John Hough	Mark Lester, Lionel Jeffries, Susan George	Thriller	
Figures in a Landscape	Joseph Losey	Malcolm McDowell, Robert Shaw, Christopher Malcolm	Thriller	
Fragment of Fear	Richard C. Sarafian	David Hemmings, Gayle Hunnicutt, Wilfrid Hyde-White	Thriller	
The Games	Michael Winner	Michael Crawford, Ryan O'Neal	Drama	
Games That Lovers Play	Malcolm Leigh	Joanna Lumley, Penny Brahms	Comedy	
The Go-Between	Joseph Losey	Julie Christie, Alan Bates	Drama	Won the Grand Prix at the 1971 Cannes Film Festival
Groupie Girl	Derek Ford	Billy Boyle, Richard Shaw Jimmy Beck	Drama	
Hell Boats	Paul Wendkos	James Franciscus, Elizabeth Shepherd	World War II	
Hello-Goodbye	Jean Negulesco	Michael Crawford, Curt Jurgens, Genevieve Gilles	Comedy	
Hoffman	Alvin Rakoff	Peter Sellers, Sinéad Cusack, Jeremy Bulloch	Drama	
The Horror of Frankenstein	Jimmy Sangster	Ralph Bates, Kate O'Mara, Veronica Carlson	Horror	
The House That Dripped Blood	Peter Duffell	Christopher Lee, Peter Cushing	Portmanteau horror	
I Start Counting	David Greene	Jenny Agutter, Simon Ward, Bryan Marshall	Thriller	
Julius Caesar	Stuart Burge	Charlton Heston, John Gielgud	Drama	Filmed Shakespeare play
The Last Grenade	Gordon Flemyng	Stanley Baker, Alex Cord, Honor Blackman	War	
Leo the Last	John Boorman	Marcello Mastroianni Billie Whitelaw, Calvin Lockhart	Drama	Boorman won Best Director at the 1970 Cannes Film Festival.
The Longest Most Meaningless Movie in the World	Vincent Patouillard	None	Documentary	
The Looking Glass War	Frank Pierson	Christopher Jones	Action, Thriller	
Loot	Silvio Narizzano	Richard Attenborough, Lee Remick	Black comedy	Entered into the 1971 Cannes Film Festival
Love Is a Splendid Illusion	Tom Clegg	Simon Brent, Andrée Flamand	Drama	
The Man Who Had Power Over Women	John Krish	Rod Taylor, Carol White	Comedy	
The Man Who Haunted Himself	Basil Dearden	Roger Moore, Anton Rodgers, Thorley Walters	Thriller	
The McKenzie Break	Lamont Johnson	Brian Keith, Helmut Griem, Ian Hendry	World War II/POW	
The Mind of Mr. Soames	Alan Cooke	Terence Stamp, Robert Vaughn, Nigel Davenport	Sci-fi	
Mumsy, Nanny, Sonny and Girly	Freddie Francis	Michael Bryant, Ursula Howells, Vanessa Howard	Comedy horror	
My Lover, My Son	John Newland	Romy Schneider, Donald Houston, Dennis Waterman	Drama	
Ned Kelly	Tony Richardson	Mick Jagger, Mark McManus, Sue Lloyd	Adventure	
One Brief Summer	John Mackenzie	Clifford Evans, Felicity Gibson	Drama	
One Day in the Life of Ivan Denisovich	Caspar Wrede	Tom Courtenay, Espen Skjønberg, Alf Malland	Drama	Co-production with Norway
One More Time	Jerry Lewis	Sammy Davis Jr. Peter Lawford; John Wood	Comedy	Co-production with US
Perfect Friday	Peter Hall	Ursula Andress, Stanley Baker, David Warner	Crime	
Performance	Donald Cammell, Nicolas Roeg	Mick Jagger, James Fox, Anita Pallenberg	Crime drama	Number 48 in the list of BFI Top 100 British films
The Private Life of Sherlock Holmes	Billy Wilder	Robert Stephens, Geneviève Page, Christopher Lee	Detective drama	
The Railway Children	Lionel Jeffries	Jenny Agutter, Gary Warren	Family drama	Number 66 in the list of BFI Top 100 British films
The Rise and Rise of Michael Rimmer	Kevin Billington	Peter Cook, Denholm Elliott, Ronald Fraser	Comedy	
Ryan's Daughter	David Lean	Robert Mitchum, Sarah Miles, John Mills, Christopher Jones	Drama	Winner of two Academy Awards
Say Hello to Yesterday	Alvin Rakoff	Jean Simmons, Leonard Whiting	Drama	
Scars of Dracula	Roy Ward Baker	Christopher Lee, Patrick Troughton, Jenny Hanley	Horror	
Scream and Scream Again	Gordon Hessler	Vincent Price, Christopher Lee	Horror thriller	
Scrooge	Ronald Neame	Albert Finney, Alec Guinness	Musical	
Secrets of Sex	Antony Balch	Richard Schulman, Janet Spearman	Sex fantasy	
A Severed Head	Dick Clement	Lee Remick, Richard Attenborough	Black comedy	
Simon, Simon	Graham Stark	Peter Sellers, Julia Foster	Comedy	Short film
Some Will, Some Won't	Duncan Wood	Ronnie Corbett, Leslie Phillips	Comedy	
Spring and Port Wine	Peter Hammond	James Mason, Diana Coupland	Drama	
Take a Girl Like You	Jonathan Miller	Hayley Mills, Oliver Reed	Comedy	
Tam Lin	Roddy McDowall	Ava Gardner, Ian McShane	Horror	
Taste the Blood of Dracula	Peter Sasdy	Christopher Lee	Horror	
Taste of Excitement	Don Sharp	Eva Renzi, David Buck	Crime	
There's a Girl in My Soup	Roy Boulting	Peter Sellers, Goldie Hawn	Comedy	
Three Sisters	Laurence Olivier, John Sichel	Jeanne Watts, Joan Plowright	Drama	Film of Chekhov play
Too Late the Hero	Robert Aldrich	Michael Caine, Cliff Robertson	World War II	
Trog	Freddie Francis	Joan Crawford, Michael Gough	Sci-fi	
Two a Penny	James F. Collier	Cliff Richard, Dora Bryan	Drama	
The Vampire Lovers	Roy Ward Baker	Ingrid Pitt, Kate O'Mara, Peter Cushing	Horror	
The Virgin and the Gypsy	Christopher Miles	Joanna Shimkus, Franco Nero	Drama	Screened at the 1970 Cannes Film Festival
The Walking Stick	Eric Till	David Hemmings, Samantha Eggar, Phyllis Calvert	Crime drama	
Wuthering Heights	Robert Fuest	Anna Calder-Marshall, Timothy Dalton, Harry Andrews	Historical drama	
The Yin and the Yang of Mr. Go	Burgess Meredith	James Mason, Jack MacGowran	Thriller	
You Can't Win 'Em All	Peter Collinson	Tony Curtis, Charles Bronson, Michèle Mercier	Action comedy	

=== Documentaries ans Short films ===
Title	Director	Cast	Genre	Notes				
The Body	Roy Battersby	Frank Finlay, Vanessa Redgrave	Documentary					
A Horse Called Nijinsky	Jo Durden-Smith	Nijinsky II	Documentary					
Futtock's End	Bob Kellett	Michael Hordern, Ronnie Barker	Comedy					
Let It Be	Michael Lindsay-Hogg	The Beatles	Music documentary		The Nine Ages of Nakedness	Harrison Marks	Rita Webb, Sue Bond	Sex comedy

== Top Box Office Films at British Box Office in 1970 ==
1. The Battle of Britain
2. Paint Your Wagon
3. On Her Majesty's Secret Service
4. M*A*S*H
5. Funny Girl
6. Midnight Cowboy
7. Butch Cassidy and the Sundance Kid
8. Oliver!
9. Anne of the Thousand Days
10. Cromwell
11. Where Eagles Dare
12. Women in Love
13. Carry On Up the Jungle
14. Every Home Should Have One
15. The Lion in Winter
16. Woodstock
17. Hello, Dolly!

== See also ==
- 1970 in British music
- 1970 in British radio
- 1970 in British television
- 1970 in the United Kingdom
