= 1970 United Kingdom dockers' strike =

The docks strike of 1970 was a major industrial action by dockers in the United Kingdom that raised fears of food shortages and led to a proclamation of a state of emergency by Queen Elizabeth II.

Dockers went on a national strike over a rejected pay increase which amounted to nearly double the basic pay. Trade links to Britain were severed by 90% after the first two weeks, while the British Army were on standby to protect food imports if necessary. Dock unions ultimately accepted a pay increase of 7%, plus improved holiday and overtime pay.

== Negotiations ==
Hopes of preventing the strike from happening looked hopeful on 13 July, with talks extending beyond midnight on the second day of negotiations and totalling 30 hours by the 3rd day. Dockers were campaigning for a basic pay rise to £20 a week (equivalent to £327 in 2023), an increase of £11 per week (equivalent to £180 in 2023), affecting 47,000 dockers.

Talks ultimately failed, with dockers rejecting a proposed pay offer in a vote by 48 to 32 and on 15 July 1970, a national strike ensued. Before the vote was even taken, over half the dock workforce had already began strike action. Employers said the industry was unable to afford the pay increase demands, instead offering a compromise of a guaranteed £20 a week, regardless whether someone works or not, with potential for more depending on the amount of work done. It was advised that, had the demands been met, dock workers could have an effective take-home pay of around £55 a week (equivalent to £900 in 2023), which was considerably more than the average weekly wage of £35 a week (equivalent to £570 in 2023).

== Impact ==
The strike seriously cut imports and exports and cost the British economy between £50 and £100 million (£495 and 990 million at 2003 prices). The British Army were stood by to protect food supplies but most dockers agreed to handle perishable goods and the strike was largely peaceful. The dockers lost £4 million (equivalent to £65,314,900 in 2023) in wages.

By 25 July, post offices in Ottawa, Canada were refusing to accept further surface mail bound for the United Kingdom, as 4,000 mail bags had been delayed since the dispute started, while at this time, 3,000 of them were either on vessels or already en-route. Air mail was unaffected.

Two weeks following the start of the strike, dockworkers were reported to be tiring of the dispute, which was understood to have severed Britain's trade links by around 90%.

== Conclusion ==
A court of inquiry was convened under Lord Pearson and proposed an average 7% increase in pay. Though this was at first rejected by the dockers, it was ultimately accepted on 30 July, along with improved holiday and overtime pay. Despite the proposal being accepted, over a third of union representatives remained against the settlement, with fears of wildcat strike action at some ports, in particular at the Port of Liverpool, where it was believed dockworkers were unhappy with the settlement terms.
