= Jon Lawes =

Jon Lawes MRAeS is a British author and aviation engineer.

He wrote the motor sport reference book Competition Car Electrics. It was described as "Essential reading for anyone building a car for competition or track use".

He has been involved in various levels of motorsport, from supporting Ferrari in the Maranello Challenge, to competing in amateur level rallies.

He is an electrical systems advisor for teams in varying disciplines, from Rallying to D1 Drifting. His company, Spearmint Technology, provides contracted engineering and electrical support to motorsport and classic vehicles. He writes magazine articles.

He is great-grandson of English banjo composer Frank Lawes.

In August 2007, Jon and a team of motorsport enthusiasts appeared on ITV'ss Pulling Power in a piece on drag racing. Appearances of note include the Discovery Channel Canada show Daily Planet. He has appeared on The Discovery Channel and The GAMMA Project.

== Bibliography ==
- Competition Car Electrics: A Practical Handbook, Haynes Publishing, 2006.
- Car Brakes: A Guide to Upgrading, Repair and Maintenance, The Crowood Press, 2014
