= Jenny Scott =

British journalist

Jenny Scott (born 1970) is an English journalist and economist, currently an advisor to the Governor of the Bank of England.

== Career ==
=== Economist ===
On graduation, Scott joined the Bank of England as an economist, before joining Reuters in 1994. She wrote primarily in her field of expertise on economic affairs, but also spent a year in Amsterdam as a general news correspondent. She then returned to London to write the book The Living Economy.

=== BBC ===
After seven years with Reuters, Scott joined BBC News as their economics correspondent, until May 2008. In January 2007, Scott presented five special interviews with key figures from business on HARDtalk, known as HARDtalk Business.

She then began co-presenting The Weekend Business on BBC Radio 5 Live, as well as co-presenting the BBC Two political magazine show The Daily Politics, alongside Andrew Neil. She also occasionally presented on BBC News 24, and had a stint covering Wimbledon.

=== Bank of England ===
On 16 April 2008, it was announced that Scott had been appointed Director of Communications at the Bank of England, succeeding Peter Rodgers when he retired at the end of June. On 17 February 2011, the Bank of England issued a press release to say that Scott was going to be on adoption leave for a year. After being replaced as Director of Communications by fellow ex-BBC journalist Nils Blythe, Scott returned to the Bank as an Adviser to the Governor in June 2013.
