= Frank Lawes =

British musician

Frank Lawes (1894 – 17 November 1970) was an English banjo composer and performer from Acton, London. He composed a large number of well known banjo pieces which are still part of the standard repertoire and much recorded. He was unusual in playing a plectrum banjo finger style. His second wife Alice played the accordion. He died in Ifold, West Sussex, and was buried with his favourite banjo.

His son Jim is an amateur harmonia player and his granddaughter Alison Hustwitt is a singer songwriter although her instrument is the guitar.

He is the great grandfather of motoring author Jon Lawes.

== Pieces Composed ==
The pieces he is believed to have composed currently stands at:

- "Syncopatin' Shuffle"
- "Hot Frets"
- "Pandemonium Rag" (December 1966)
- "Rubbin' Shoulders"
- "Good Old Twenties" (July 1966)
- "Twinkle In Your Eye" (December 1965)
- "Clap Trap" (June 1960)
- "Cute and Catchy"
- "Fretboard Frolic"

"Cute and Catchy" was originally to be named "Dinkie", a nickname given to his daughter, according to handwritten notes discovered on some of his music.
