= MJ Hibbett =

English guitarist and singer-songwriter (born 1970)

Mark Hibbett
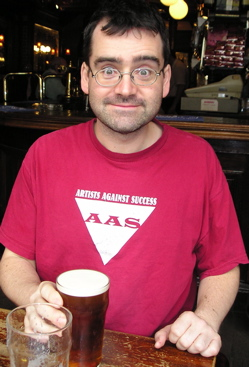
- Hibbett wears an Artists Against Success T-shirt and holds a pint in a pub, November 2004.
- Born: 19 June 1970 (age 56)
- Other name: MJ Hibbett
- Education: University of the Arts London; De Montfort University
- Occupation: Database administrator
- Website: www.mjhibbett.com

Mark John Hibbett (born 19 June 1970) is an English academic in comics studies, specialising in Doctor Doom, and is also, when performing as MJ Hibbett, a guitarist singer-songwriter who has often been compared to Billy Bragg or Richard Digance.

== Music ==
With his band The Validators, Hibbett came to widespread online notice in 2000 with "Hey Hey 16K", an ode to the ZX Spectrum and other home microcomputers of the 1980s. The song, one of the "first-ever viral videos", gained larger acclaim when an animated music video for the track, created by Rob Manuel, was released in 2004. Hibbett later collaborated with Manuel, who directed the music video for his song "The Gay Train".

In 2004, Hibbett gained national exposure in the United Kingdom, on the Steve Lamacq show on BBC 6 Music, by regularly performing "The Fair Play Trophy (Again)", a song whose lyrics were updated for each rendition to reflect the then-ongoing events of that year's UEFA European Football Championship.

In 2009, Hibbett and his band released their fourth album Regardez, Ecoutez et Repetez, with lyrics formed from Hibbett's wry observations, often of the trivial. Critical reviews indicated the songs could be "catchy-as-hell", such as "Red Black Gold", however that repeated listens did tend to "dull the humour".

Hibbett and his band often appeared at the Indietracks indie pop music festival. His songs have mostly been released on his own record label, Artists Against Success.

Hibbett is an advocate of the ukulele, which he has used for solo performances and in his song and album A Million Ukeleles. The noted misspelling is characteristic Hibbett.

== Research in comics ==
Hibbett earned a doctorate in comics studies at Central Saint Martins in the University of the Arts London. This is the world's only doctorate on Doctor Doom, which was later published in book form. He has performed a musical version of his research at various fringe comedy events and at London Data Week. This journey has since been summarized in a five-part podcast exploring Doom.

Hibbett has since used his expertise to comment on developments with Doom and on Superman in film.

Alongside John Dredge, he co-hosted the Funny Comics Fan Club podcast, which focused on classic British comics.

== Personal life ==
Hibbett lives in London and works at the University of the Arts, where he uses his experience as a database administrator.

He holds master's degrees from City University and from De Montfort University, and attended Deacon's School.

He is a supporter of Peterborough United F.C.
